= List of Israeli settlements =

Map of Israeli settlements (magenta) in the West Bank in 2025

This is a list of Israeli settlements and their populations in the Israeli-occupied territories of the West Bank, including East Jerusalem, and the Golan Heights. Israel had previously established settlements in both the Gaza Strip and the Sinai Peninsula; however, the Gaza settlements were dismantled in the Israeli disengagement from Gaza in 2005, and the Sinai settlements were evacuated with the Egypt–Israel peace treaty and the return of the Sinai Peninsula to Egypt. This list does not include West Bank settlements that were dismantled or Israeli outposts.

== Background ==
Israel in effect annexed East Jerusalem with the Jerusalem Law and considers settlements in the expanded boundaries of East Jerusalem to be neighborhoods of Jerusalem and not settlements. The United Nations Security Council ruled that act "null and void" in United Nations Security Council Resolution 478, and the international community considers East Jerusalem to continue to be held under Israeli occupation.

Israel in effect annexed the Golan Heights with the Golan Heights Law and does not consider the localities established there to be settlements. The United Nations Security Council ruled that act "null and void" in United Nations Security Council Resolution 497 and the international community continues to view the Golan Heights to be Syrian territory held under Israeli occupation.

The international community considers Israeli settlements in the Israeli-occupied territories illegal under international law, violating the Fourth Geneva Convention's prohibition on the transfer of a civilian population to or from occupied territory, though Israel disputes this.

The population statistics for Israeli settlements in the West Bank are collected by the Israel Central Bureau of Statistics. As such, the data contains only population of settlements recognized by the Israeli authorities. Israeli outposts, which are illegal by Israeli law, are not tracked, and their population is hard to establish. All settlements in the West Bank were advised by the International Court of Justice to be unlawful.

As of January 2023, there are 144 Israeli settlements in the West Bank, including 12 in East Jerusalem. In addition, there are over 100 Israeli illegal outposts in the West Bank. In total, over 529,000 Israeli settlers live in the West Bank excluding East Jerusalem, with an additional 246,000 Jewish settlers residing in East Jerusalem.

The construction of the West Bank barrier keeps a significant number of settlements behind it. The total number of settlers east of the barrier lines in 2012 was at least 79,230. By comparison, the number of Gaza Strip settlers in 2005 who refused to move voluntarily and be compensated, and that were forcibly evicted during the Israeli disengagement from Gaza, was around 9,000.

== West Bank ==
=== City settlements in the West Bank ===
Five settlements have been given city status. Their combined population is over 240,000, representing around half of the West Bank settler population outside of East Jerusalem.

Name	Hebrew	Image map	Population (2024)	Est.	Council
Ariel	אריאל	Map of the area	22,191	1978	Shomron
Beitar Illit	ביתר עילית	Map of the area	71,697	1985	Gush Etzion
Giv'at Ze'ev	גבעת זאב	Map of the area	25,104	1983	Mateh Binyamin
Ma'ale Adumim	מעלה אדומים	Map of the area	35,846	1975	Gush Etzion
Modi'in Illit	מודיעין עילית	Map of the area	89,627	1996	Mateh Binyamin

=== Other settlements in the West Bank, excluding East Jerusalem ===
Name	Hebrew	Population (2024)	Est.	Council
Adora (Adura)	אדורה	575	1984	Har Hebron
Alei Zahav	עלי זהב	5,473	1982	Shomron
Alfei Menashe	אלפי מנשה	8,038	1983	Shomron
Almog	אלמוג	347	1977	Megilot
Almon	עלמון	1,474	1982	Mateh Binyamin
Alon	אלון	1,031	1990	Mateh Binyamin
Alon Shvut	אלון שבות	3,141	1970	Gush Etzion
Amihai	עמיחי	209	2018	Mateh Binyamin
Argaman	ארגמן	184	1968	Bik'at HaYarden
Asfar (Metzad)	מיצד	1,513	1983	Gush Etzion
Ateret	עטרת	716	1981	Mateh Binyamin
Avnat (Ovnat)	אבנת	292	1983	Megilot
Avnei Hefetz	אבני חפץ	2,526	1990	Shomron
Barkan	ברקן	2,171	1981	Shomron
Bat Ayin	בת עין	2,034	1989	Gush Etzion
Beit Aryeh-Ofarim	בית אריה	5,627	1981	Shomron
Beit El	בית אל	6,359	1977	Mateh Binyamin
Beit HaArava	בית הערבה	609	1980	Megilot
Beit Horon	בית חורון	1,435	1977	Mateh Binyamin
Beit Yatir (Metzadot Yehuda)	בית יתיר	792	1983	Har Hebron
Beka'ot (Bqa'ot)	בקעות	254	1972	Bik'at HaYarden
Brukhin	ברוכין	2,808	2012	Shomron
Carmel	כרמל	678	1981	Har Hebron
Dolev	דולב	1,593	1983	Mateh Binyamin
Efrat (Efrata)	אפרת	12,114	1980	Gush Etzion
Elazar	אלעזר	2,598	1975	Gush Etzion
Eli	עלי	4,978	1984	Mateh Binyamin
Elisha	אלישע		1982	Megilot
Elkana	אלקנה	4,493	1977	Shomron
Elon Moreh	אלון מורה	2,169	1979	Shomron
Einav (Enav)	ענב	1,228	1981	Shomron
Eshkolot	אשכולות	646	1982	Har Hebron
Etz Efraim	עץ אפרים	2,519	1985	Shomron
Ganei Modi'in	גני מודיעין	2,603	1985	Mateh Binyamin
Geva Binyamin	גבע בנימין	5,901	1984	Mateh Binyamin
Gilgal	גלגל	221	1970	Bik'at HaYarden
Gitit	גיתית	600	1973	Bik'at HaYarden
Giv'on HaHadasha	גבעון החדשה	1,171	1980	Mateh Binyamin
Haggai (Beit Hagai)	בית חגי	851	1984	Har Hebron
Halamish	חלמיש	1,485	1977	Mateh Binyamin
Hamra	חמרה	286	1971	Bik'at HaYarden
Har Adar	הר אדר	4,339	1986	Mateh Binyamin
Har Brakha	הר ברכה	3,486	1983	Shomron
Har Gilo	הר גילה	1,633	1972	Gush Etzion
Hashmonaim	חשמונאים	3,091	1985	Mateh Binyamin
Hemdat	חמדת	431	1980	Bik'at HaYarden
Hermesh	חרמש	295	1982	Shomron
Hinanit	חיננית	1,793	1981	Shomron
Immanuel	עמנואל	5,675	1983	Shomron
Itamar	איתמר	1,759	1984	Shomron
Kalya	קלי"ה	585	1968	Megilot
Karmei Tzur	כרמי צור	987	1984	Gush Etzion
Karnei Shomron	קרני שומרון	10,541	1978	Shomron
Kedar (Keidar)	קדר	1,547	1985	Gush Etzion
Kedumim	קדומים	4,564	1977	Shomron
Kfar Adumim	כפר אדומים	5,206	1979	Mateh Binyamin
Kfar Etzion	כפר עציון	1,209	1967	Gush Etzion
Kfar HaOranim (Menora)	כפר האורנים	2,314	1998	Mateh Binyamin
Kfar Tapuach	כפר תפוח	1,605	1978	Shomron
Kiryat Arba	קרית ארבע	7,698	1972	Har Hebron
Kiryat Netafim	קרית נטפים	923	1983	Shomron
Kokhav HaShahar	כוכב השחר	2,778	1977	Mateh Binyamin
Kokhav Ya'akov	כוכב יעקב	4,093	1985	Mateh Binyamin
Ma'ale Amos	מעלה עמוס	1,340	1981	Gush Etzion
Ma'ale Efrayim	מעלה אפרים	1,747	1970	Bik'at HaYarden
Ma'ale Levona	מעלה לבונה	1,006	1983	Mateh Binyamin
Ma'ale Mikhmas	מעלה מכמש	2,259	1981	Mateh Binyamin
Ma'ale Shomron	מעלה שומרון	996	1980	Shomron
Ma'on	מעון	769	1981	Har Hebron
Maskiot	משכיות	397	1986	Bik'at HaYarden
Masua	משואה	481	1970	Bik'at HaYarden
Matityahu	מתתיהו	1,119	1981	Mateh Binyamin
Mehola	מחולה	789	1968	Bik'at HaYarden
Mekhora	מכורה	270	1973	Bik'at HaYarden
Mevo Dotan	מבוא דותן	776	1978	Shomron
Mevo Horon	מבוא חורון	2,659	1970	Mateh Binyamin
Migdal Oz	מגדל עוז	615	1977	Gush Etzion
Migdalim	מגדלים	790	1983	Shomron
Mitzpe Shalem	מצפה שלם	291	1971	Megilot
Mitzpe Yeriho	מצפה יריחו	2,867	1978	Mateh Binyamin
Na'ale	נעלה	2,932	1988	Mateh Binyamin
Na'omi (Na'ama)	נעמי	165	1982	Bik'at HaYarden
Nahliel	נחליאל	798	1984	Mateh Binyamin
Negohot	נגוהות	592	1999	Har Hebron
Netiv HaGdud	נתיב הגדוד	222	1976	Bik'at HaYarden
Neve Daniel	נווה דניאל	2,418	1982	Gush Etzion
Nili	נילי	2,262	1981	Mateh Binyamin
Na'aran (Niran)	נירן	101	1977	Bik'at HaYarden
Nofei Prat	נוֹפֵי פְּרָת	1,200	1992	Mateh Binyamin
Nofim	נופים	1,462	1987	Shomron
Nokdim	נוקדים	3,498	1982	Gush Etzion
Ofra	עפרה	3,110	1975	Mateh Binyamin
Oranit	אורנית	10,089	1985	Shomron
Otniel	עתניאל	1,014	1983	Har Hebron
Peduel	פדואל	2,220	1984	Shomron
Pnei Hever (Ma'ale Hever)	מעלה חבר	600	1982	Har Hebron
Petza'el	פצאל	573	1975	Bik'at HaYarden
Psagot	פסגות	2,298	1981	Mateh Binyamin
Rehelim	רחלים	1,260	2013	Shomron
Reihan	ריחן	524	1977	Shomron
Revava	רבבה	3,202	1991	Shomron
Rimonim	רימונים	674	1977	Mateh Binyamin
Ro'i	רועי	147	1976	Bik'at HaYarden
Rosh Tzurim	ראש צורים	1,157	1969	Gush Etzion
Rotem	רותם	330	1983	Bik'at HaYarden
Sal'it	סלעית	1,471	1977	Shomron
Sansana	סנסנה	871	1997	Har Hebron
Sha'arei Tikva	שערי תקווה	6,122	1983	Shomron
Shadmot Mehola	שדמות מחולה	771	1979	Bik'at HaYarden
Shaked	שקד	1,146	1981	Shomron
Shani (Livne)	לִבְנֶה	571	1989	Har Hebron
Shavei Shomron	שבי שומרון	1,077	1977	Shomron
Shilo	שילה	6,042	1979	Mateh Binyamin
Shim'a	שמעה	1,060	1985	Har Hebron
Susiya	סוסיא	1,605	1983	Har Hebron
Talmon	טלמון	6,039	1989	Mateh Binyamin
Tekoa	תקוע	4,834	1977	Gush Etzion
Telem	תלם	655	1982	Har Hebron
Teneh Omarim	טנא עומרים	1,089	1983	Har Hebron
Tomer	תומר	444	1978	Bik'at HaYarden
Tzofim	צופים	2,605	1989	Shomron
Vered Yeriho	ורד יריחו	420	1980	Megilot
Yafit	יפית	279	1980	Bik'at HaYarden
Yakir	יקיר	2,742	1981	Shomron
Yitav	ייט"ב	184	1970	Bik'at HaYarden
Yitzhar	יצהר	2,525	1983	Shomron

Several former Israeli outposts have been retroactively "legalized" under Israeli law as "neighborhoods" of formerly existing Israeli settlements:

- Givat Harsina, also called Ramat Mamre, legalized as "neighborhood" of Kiryat Arba
- Kfar Eldad, considered a "neighborhood" of Nokdim
- Kerem Reim, retroactively legalized as a "neighborhood" of Talmon
- Leshem, retroactively legalized as a "neighborhood" of Alei Zahav
- Neria, retroactively legalized as a "neighborhood" of Talmon
- Nofei Nehemia, retroactively legalized as a "neighborhood" of Rehelim
- Sdeh Bar Farm, retroactively legalized as a "neighborhood" of Nokdim
- Shvut Rachel, retroactively legalized as a "neighborhood" of Shilo
- Tal Menashe, retroactively legalized as a "neighborhood" of Hinanit
- Yair Farm, retroactively legalized as a "neighborhood" of Yakir

==== Historic data ====
Statistics below refer to the period between 1999 and 2018.

Population of Israeli West Bank settlements
Name	Hebrew	2018	2017	2016	2015	2010	2005	2003	2000	1999	Est.	Fence	Council	Subarea or bloc
Adora	אדורה	440	440	421	404	240	206	191	271	291	1984	E	Har Hebron	West
Alei Zahav	עלי זהב	2739	2133	1643	1300	498	684	424	391	355	1982	W	Shomron	Western S.
Alfei Menashe	אלפי מנשה	7865	7801	7780	7638	7079	5541	5,347	4,580	4,410	1983	W	Shomron	Western S.
Alon Shvut	אלון שבות	3151	3213	3180	3218	3033	3291	3,146	2,680	2,230	1970	W	Gush Etzion	Etzion
Almog	אלמוג	253	250	239	207	170	159	141	167	156	1977	V	Megilot	Dead Sea
Almon (Anatot)	עלמון (ענתות)	1378	1391	1329	1286	893	762	726	698	672	1982	W	Binyamin	Adumim
Argaman	ארגמן	133	128	131	133	169	166	169	164	155	1968	V	Bik'at HaYarden	Jordan Valley
Ariel	אריאל	20456	19626	19220	18717	17668	16520	16,053	15,600	15,100	1978	W	Shomron	Western S.
Asfar (Metzad)	מיצד (אספר)	835	729	688	583	401	258	232	361	356	1983	E	Gush Etzion	Judean Mtns
Ateret	עטרת	913	897	875	894	770	373	349	302	287	1981	E	Mateh Binyamin	Western B.
Avnei Hefetz	אבני חפץ	1895	1836	1759	1709	1553	1127	964	785	695	1990	E	Shomron	Western S.
Barkan	ברקן	1833	1825	1798	1741	1401	1231	1,217	1,150	1,080	1981	W	Shomron	Western S.
Bat Ayin	בת עין	1545	1428	1307	1226	987	804	767			1989	W	Gush Etzion	Etzion
Beit Aryeh-Ofarim	בית אריה	5139	4955	4842	4721	3909	3457	2,522	2,380	2,330	1981	W	Shomron	Western S.
Beit El	בית אל	6042	6101	6115	6046	5626	4967	4,627	4,120	3,800	1977	E	Mateh Binyamin	Ramallah
Beit HaArava	בית הערבה	290	222	183	159	120	83	54	55	45	1980	V	Megilot	Dead Sea
Beit Horon	בית חורון	1362	1274	1240	1228	1115	848	822	772	720	1977	W	Mateh Binyamin	Giv'on
Beit Yatir (Mezadot Yehuda)	בית יתיר (מצדות יהודה)	512	492	466	467	379	431	412	422	412	1983	W	Har Hebron	South
Beitar Illit	ביתר עילית	56746	54557	51636	49343	37575	26996	22,926	15,800	12,700	1985	W	Gush Etzion	Etzion
Beka'ot	בקעות	176	184	187	182	162	156	145	144	144	1972	V	Bik'at HaYarden	Jordan Valley
Brukhin	ברוכין	1093	919	818	719	n/a					2012	W	Shomron	Western S.
Carmei Tzur	כרמי צור	1021	1037	1047	1036	725	713	623	481	422	1984	E	Gush Etzion	Etzion
Carmel	כרמל	436	422	401	407	383	330	321	246	252	1981	E	Har Hebron	South
Dolev	דולב	1341	1400	1331	1302	1195	1034	973	880	850	1983	E	Mateh Binyamin	Western B.
Efrat(a)	אפרת	10088	9116	8658	8301	7454	7428	7,037	6,430	6,230	1980	W	Gush Etzion	Etzion
El'azar	אלעזר	2510	2571	2568	2577	1905	1131	882	784	747	1975	W	Gush Etzion	Etzion
Eli	עלי	4311	4281	4233	4092	3108	2420	2,058	1,900	1,730	1984	E	Mateh Binyamin	Eli
Elkana	אלקנה	3812	3884	3898	3945	3587	2963	3,050	2,990	2,940	1977	W	Shomron	Western S.
Elon Moreh	אלון מורה	1946	1912	1861	1794	1447	1212	1,097	1,060	1,050	1979	E	Shomron	Nablus
Einav	ענב	859	800	749	711	604	538	473	500	504	1981	E	Shomron	Enav
Eshkolot	אשכולות	567	521	515	494	619	225	220	171	148	1982	W	Har Hebron	South
Etz Efraim	עץ אפרים	2292	2204	2022	1822	760	642	617	525	500	1985	W	Shomron	Western S.
Ganei Modi'in	גני מודיעין	2760	2445	2411	2347	n/a					1996	W	Mateh Binyamin	Modi'in
Ganim	גנים						0	139	158	149	1983	E	Shomron	Northern S.
Geva Binyamin (Adam)	גבע בנימין (אדם)	5525	5409	5278	5232	4370	2436	1,801	1,020	707	1984	E	Mateh Binyamin	Ramallah
Gilgal, Bik'at HaYarden	גלגל	178	180	178	171	166	164	162	180	164	1970	V	Bik'at HaYarden	Jordan Valley
Gitit	גיתית	476	457	430	376	297	191	119	100	109	1973	V	Bik'at HaYarden	Jordan Valley
Giv'at Ze'ev	גבעת זאב	17922	17323	16865	16123	11764	10656	10,790	10,300	10,000	1983	W	Mateh Binyamin	Giv'on
Giv'on Hadasha	גבעון החדשה	1086	1139	1135	1151	1097	1147	1,224	1,190	1,180	1980	W	Mateh Binyamin	Giv'on
Hagai	בית חגי (חגי)	635	596	573	592	502	452	388	406	405	1984	E	Har Hebron	Hebron
Halamish	חלמיש	1478	1314	1328	1278	1090	941	915	922	1,100	1977	E	Mateh Binyamin	Western B.
Hamra	חמרה	175	126	124	127	88	132	131	147	149	1971	V	Bik'at HaYarden	Jordan Valley
Har Adar (Giv'at HaRadar)	הר אדר (גבעת הרדאר)	4056	4058	3980	3858	3426	2260	1,839	1,420	1,380	1986	W	Mateh Binyamin	Giv'on
Har Brakha (Brakha)	הר ברכה (ברכה)	2620	2468	2339	2267	1691	1094	880	752	714	1983	E	Shomron	Nablus
Har Gilo	הר גילה	1590	1568	1570	1505	602	381	369	363		1972	W	Gush Etzion	Etzion
Hashmonaim	חשמונאים	2760	2820	2826	2762	2610	2225	2,097	1,830	1,770	1985	W	Mateh Binyamin	Modi'in
Hebron	חברון							554			1980	E	Har Hebron	Hebron
Hemdat	חמדת	278	248	230	233	178	140	107			1980	V	Bik'at HaYarden	Jordan Valley
Hermesh	חרמש	228	215	223	219	184	212	229	279	272	1982	E	Shomron	Rehan
Hinanit	חיננית	1323	1295	1164	1089	813	760	669	481	432	1981	W	Shomron	Rehan
Homesh	חומש						0	156	159	163	1980	E	Shomron	Northern S.
Immanuel	עמנואל	3693	3440	3309	3253	2948	2583	2,455	3,040	3,150	1983	W	Shomron	Western S.
Itamar	איתמר	1238	1199	1151	1305	1101	651	557	541	511	1984	E	Shomron	Nablus
Kadim	קדים						0	128	148	138	1983	E	Shomron	Northern S.
Kalya	קלי"ה	416	399	386	394	306	271	260	260	262	1968	V	Megilot	Dead Sea
Karnei Shomron	קרני שומרון	7713	7369	7102	6905	6284	6280	6,093	5,890	5,590	1978	W	Shomron	Western S.
Kedar	קדר	1565	1590	1555	1490	1028	728	624	447	393	1985	W	Gush Etzion	Adumim
Kedumim	קדומים	4596	4481	4323	4338	3877	3087	2,934	2,660	2,540	1977	W	Shomron	Kedumim
Kfar Adumim	כפר אדומים	4513	4381	4271	4145	3286	2127	1,866	1,690	1,590	1979	W	Mateh Binyamin	Adumim
Kfar Etzion	כפר עציון	1152	1145	1099	1071	804	422	404	427	421	1967	W	Gush Etzion	Etzion
Kfar Tapuach	כפר תפוח	1238	1166	1071	970	1025	648	523	347	352	1978	E	Shomron	Western S.
Kiryat Arba	קרית ארבע	7323	7339	7272	7108	7248	6819	6,605	6,380	6,240	1972	E	Har Hebron	Hebron
Kiryat Netafim	קרית נטפים	937	929	910	865	690	438	384	249	240	1983	W	Shomron	Western S.
Kokhav HaShahar	כוכב השחר	2122	2053	1985	1945	1557	1449	1,367	1,150	1,080	1977	V	Mateh Binyamin	Jordan
Kokhav Ya'akov (Abir Ya'akov)	כוכב יעקב (אביר יעקב)	8194	7687	7394	7313	6006	4919	3,819	1,640	1,260	1985	E	Mateh Binyamin	Ramallah
Lapid	לפיד	2459	2485	2520	2551	2497	2247	2,176			1996	W	Hevel Modi'in	Modi'in
Livne	שני (לבנה)	546	540	502	471	441	424	438	483	490	1989	W	Har Hebron	South
Ma'ale Adumim	מעלה אדומים	38193	37817	37670	37525	35673	30162	27,259	24,900	23,800	1975	W	Gush Etzion	Adumim
Ma'ale Amos	מעלה עמוס	535	421	390	384	255	340	299	336	342	1981	E	Gush Etzion	Judean Mtns
Ma'ale Efraim	מעלה אפרים	1241	1205	1209	1206	1250	1423	1,443	1,480	1,460	1970	V	Bik'at HaYarden	Jordan Valley
Ma'ale Levona	מעלה לבונה	866	813	826	766	686	545	497	445	447	1983	E	Mateh Binyamin	Eli
Ma'ale Mikhmas	מעלה מכמש	1463	1402	1323	1351	1104	1126	980	826	753	1981	V	Mateh Binyamin	
Ma'ale Shomron	מעלה שומרון	1012	1045	1037	1015	837	574	533	527	486	1980	W	Shomron	Western S.
Ma'on	מעון	575	560	539	502	357	347	327	283	265	1981	E	Har Hebron	South
Maskiot	משכיות	286	276	253	206	n/a	n/a		507	N/A	1986	V	Bik'at HaYarden	Jordan Valley
Masua	משואה	170	161	162	148	141	136	145	148	140	1970	V	Bik'at HaYarden	Jordan Valley
Matityahu	מתתיהו	847	802	772	698	465	1353	1,365	1,380	1,410	1981	W	Mateh Binyamin	Modi'in
Mehola	מחולה	575	537	517	471	400	362	327	306	315	1968	V	Bik'at HaYarden	Jordan Valley
Mekhora	מכורה	161	136	142	141	131	120	125	113	120	1973	V	Bik'at HaYarden	Jordan Valley
Kfar HaOranim (Menora)	כפר האורנים (מנורה)	2664	2708	2678	2700	2509	1804	1,240	768	332	1998	W	Mateh Binyamin	Modi'in
Mevo Dotan	מבוא דותן	403	393	386	364	280	303	289	310	314	1978	E	Shomron	Rehan
Mevo Horon	מבוא חורון	2650	2589	2566	2517	1771	950	712	497	494	1970	W	Mateh Binyamin	Modi'in
Migdal Oz	מגדל עוז	570	605	605	439	412	334	298	289	280	1977	W	Gush Etzion	Etzion
Migdalim	מגדלים	368	335	305	269	142	150	152	154	150	1983	E	Shomron	Western S.
Mitzpe Shalem	מצפה שלם	211	184	174	173	166	180	193	210	208	1971	V	Megilot	Dead Sea
Mitzpe Yeriho	מצפה יריחו	2453	2394	2319	2307	1851	1536	1,430	1,210	1,160	1978	V	Mateh Binyamin	Jordan
Modi'in Illit	מודיעין עילית	73080	70081	66847	64179	48639	30484	24,290	16,400	13,000	1996	W	Mateh Binyamin	Modi'in
Na'ale	נעלה	1942	1804	1661	1573	1035	623	556	137	105	1988	E	Mateh Binyamin	
Nahliel	נחליאל	713	663	639	665	412	264	248	244	230	1984	E	Mateh Binyamin	Western B.
Negohot	נגוהות	356	332	289	288	245	150	134	409	n/a	1999	E	Har Hebron	West
Netiv HaGdud	נתיב הגדוד	199	191	190	181	186	127	120	139	143	1976	V	Bik'at HaYarden	Jordan Valley
Neve Daniel	נווה דניאל	2315	2370	2278	2275	1824	1467	1,073	933	868	1982	W	Gush Etzion	Etzion
Nili	נילי	1714	1597	1552	1438	846	852	806	721	666	1981	E	Mateh Binyamin	
Na'aran	נירן	92	92	91	85	52	49	52	56	45	1977	V	Bik'at HaYarden	Jordan Valley
Nofim	נופים	794	720	690	638	421	400	402	385	362	1987	W	Shomron	Western S.
Nokdim	נוקדים	2250	2160	2052	1937	1413	729	646	611	526	1982	E	Gush Etzion	Judean Mtns
Na'omi (Na'ama)	נעמ"ה	151	135	116	118	100	130	123	121	133	1982	V	Bik'at HaYarden	Jordan Valley
Ofarim	עופרים						n/a	870	686	623	1989	W	Mateh Binyamin	
Ofra	עפרה	3039	3607	3605	3189	3296	2384	2,214	1,880	1,870	1975	E	Mateh Binyamin	Ramallah
Oranit	אורנית	8807	9655	8652	8495	6205	5585	5,316	5,070	4,780	1985	W	Shomron	Western S.
Otniel	עתניאל	1037	1003	976	909	787	747	698	560	553	1983	E	Har Hebron	South
Ovnat	אבנת	185	201	193	128	101	n/a				1983	V	Megilot	Dead Sea
Peduel	פדואל	1910	1746	1682	1622	1185	1113	1,088	885	834	1984	W	Shomron	Western S.
Ma'ale Hever (Pnei Hever)	מעלה חבר (פני חבר)	586	561	548	432	380	375	376	304	266	1982	E	Har Hebron	Hebron
Petza'el	פצאל	283	262	257	250	214	215	213	224	228	1975	V	Bik'at HaYarden	Jordan Valley
Psagot	פסגות	1903	1848	1847	1902	1658	1464	1,278	1,090	1,030	1981	E	Mateh Binyamin	Ramallah
Rehelim	רחלים	790	747	668	583	n/a					2013		Shomron	
Reihan	ריחן	308	265	224	213	177	150	129	120	100	1977	W	Shomron	Rehan
Revava	רבבה	2466	2389	2181	1974	1262	827	703	504	389	1991	W	Shomron	Western S.
Rimonim	רימונים	687	675	625	598	632	561	512	499	474	1977	V	Mateh Binyamin	Jordan
Ro'i	רועי	169	168	165	162	157	117	118	141	133	1976	V	Bik'at HaYarden	Jordan Valley
Rosh Tzurim	ראש צורים	926	934	934	915	606	364	263	265	290	1969	W	Gush Etzion	Etzion
Rotem	רותם	212	207	196	168	n/a					1983	V	Bik'at HaYarden	Jordan Valley
Sa-Nur	שא-נור						0	55	52	54	1982	E	Shomron	Northern S.
Sal'it	סלעית	1190	1010	818	693	525	447	441	410	377	1977	W	Shomron	Enav
Sansana	סנסנה	458	408	377	334	n/a					1997		Har Hebron	
Sha'arei Tikva	שערי תקווה	6011	5921	5811	5638	4727	3709	3,692	3,380	3,220	1983	W	Shomron	Western S.
Shadmot Mehola	שדמות מחולה	645	652	608	553	494	516	507	399	400	1979	V	Bik'at HaYarden	Jordan Valley
Shaked	שקד	972	936	864	851	661	527	524	497	468	1981	W	Shomron	Rehan
Shavei Shomron	שבי שומרון	929	900	897	879	688	606	604	573	569	1977	E	Shomron	Western S.
Shilo	שילה	4153	3988	3727	3379	2172	1945	1,810	1,580	1,490	1979	E	Mateh Binyamin	Eli
Shim'a	שמעה	714	649	592	538	316	349	357	296	263	1985	E	Har Hebron	South
Susya	סוסיא	1301	1170	1115	1041	923	700	643	482	468	1983	E	Har Hebron	South
Talmon	טלמון	4349	4058	3879	3704	2797	1964	1,618	1,250	1,150	1989	E	Mateh Binyamin	Western B.
Tekoa	תקוע	3882	3750	3633	3495	1808	1243	1,116	980	948	1977	E	Gush Etzion	Judean Mtns
Telem	תלם	432	391	362	336	241	152	127	97	101	1982	E	Har Hebron	West
Tene Omarim (Tene)	טנא עומרים	848	799	768	756	608	532	563	561	580	1983	E	Har Hebron	South
Tomer	תומר	283	266	262	247	234	281	298	308	307	1978	V	Bik'at HaYarden	Jordan Valley
Vered Jericho	ורד יריחו	317	298	252	239	196	156	161	164	155	1980	V	Megilot	Dead Sea
Yafit	יפית	197	164	139	149	107	99	95	125	118	1980	V	Bik'at HaYarden	Jordan Valley
Yakir	יקיר	2183	2056	1901	1863	1285	984	932	822	765	1981	W	Shomron	Western S.
Yitav	ייט"ב	348	327	321	279	139	156	136	114	107	1970	V	Bik'at HaYarden	Jordan Valley
Yitzhar	יצהר	1635	1553	1468	1380	982	590	440	329	328	1983	E	Shomron	Nablus
Zofin	צופים	2369	2188	2087	1976	1251	1043	1,040	857	794	1989	W	Shomron	Kedumim
Total (excl. East Jerusalem):		430,147	416,693	401,556	388,285	313,928	249,901	226,852	192,976	177,411				
Total (incl. East Jerusalem):							401,820	362,945						

=== East Jerusalem ===
Following the capture and occupation of the West Bank, including East Jerusalem in 1967, the Israeli government effectively annexed the formerly Jordanian occupied territory and extended the Jerusalem municipality borders by adding 70,500 dunams of land with the aim of establishing Jewish settlements and cementing the status of a united city under Israeli control. The Jerusalem Master Plan 1968 called for increasing the Israeli population of Arab East Jerusalem, encircling the city with Israeli settlements and excluding large Palestinian neighborhoods from the expanded municipality. Jerusalem was effectively annexed by Israel in 1980, an act that was internationally condemned and ruled "null and void" by the United Nations Security Council in United Nations Security Council Resolution 478. The international community continues to regard East Jerusalem as occupied territory and Israel's settlements there illegal under international law.

Name	Hebrew	Population (2019)	Est.
East Talpiot	תלפיות מזרח	15,104	1967
French Hill (Giv'at Shapira)	הגבעה הצרפתית	8,826	1969
Gilo	גילֹה	30,820	1973
Giv'at Hamivtar	גבעת המבתר	2,944	1970
Har Homa	הר חומה	19,950	1997
Ma'alot Dafna	מעלות דפנה	3,260	1972
Neve Yaakov	נווה יעקב	21,780	1972
Pisgat Ze'ev	פסגת זאב	44,512	1985
Ramat Eshkol	רמת אשכול	3,573	1970
Ramat Shlomo	רמת שלמה	15,070	1995
Ramot Alon	רמות אלון	41,410	1974
Total:		207,249	

Smaller Israeli settlements in East Jerusalem include Beit Orot, Givat HaMatos, Ma'ale HaZeitim, and Nof Zion.

==== Historic data ====
Population of East Jerusalem neighborhoods
Name	Hebrew	2003	2000	Est.	Fence
East Talpiot	תלפיות מזרח	12,439	12,845	1967	W
French Hill	הגבעה הצרפתית	6,628	8,193	1969	W
Gilo	גילֹה	27,425	27,637	1973	W
Giv'at Hamivtar	גבעת המבתר	2,958	2,912	1970	W
Har Homa, Givat Hamatos	הר חומה	2,152	763	1997	W
Ma'alot Dafna	מעלות דפנה	3,664	3,645	1972	W
Neve Yaakov	נווה יעקב	20,306	20,288	1972	W
Pisgat Ze'ev	פסגת זאב	39,747	36,649	1985	W
Ramat Eshkol	רמת אשכול	3,123	2,917	1970	W
Ramat Shlomo	רמת שלמה	13,390	11,348	1995	W
Ramot	רמות אלון	39,383	37,934	1974	W
Sanhedria Murhevet	סנהדריה המורחבת	4,999	5,018	1970	W
Total:		176,214	170,149		

== Golan Heights ==
In 1967, construction of Israeli settlements began in the portion of the Golan Heights held by Israel. That area remained under military administration until 1981 when Israel passed the Golan Heights Law extending Israeli law and administration throughout the territory. That 1981 decision was condemned by the United Nations Security Council in UN Resolution 497, which stated that "the Israeli decision to impose its laws, jurisdiction and administration in the occupied Syrian Golan Heights is null and void and without international legal effect." Israel maintains it has a right to retain the Golan, citing the text of UN Resolution 242, which calls for "safe and recognised boundaries free from threats or acts of force". However, the international community rejects Israeli claims to title to the territory and regards it as sovereign Syrian territory.

Population of Israeli settlements in the Golan Heights
Name	Hebrew	Population 2024.	Est.
Katzrin	קַצְרִין	8,013	1977
Afik	אֲפִיק	402	1972
Ein Zivan	עֵין זִיוָן	534	1968
El Rom	אֶל רוֹם	620	1971
Geshur	גְּשׁוּר	357	1971
Kfar Haruv	כְּפַר חָרוּב	544	1974
Merom Golan	מְרוֹם גּוֹלָן	818	1967
Metzar	מֵיצָר	379	1981
Mevo Hama	מְבוֹא חַמָּה	568	1968
Natur	נָטוּר	770	1980
Ortal	אוֹרְטַל	374	1978
Alonei HaBashan	אַלּוֹנֵי הַבָּשָׁן	512	1981
Ani'am	אֲנִיעָם	475	1978
Avnei Eitan	אַבְנֵ"י אֵיתָ"ן	1,078	1973
Bnei Yehuda	בְּנֵי יְהוּדָה	1,244	1972
Eliad	אֵלִי עַד	594	1968
Givat Yoav	גִּבְעַת יוֹאָב	804	1968
Haspin	חַסְפִּין	1,956	1978
Kanaf	כָּנָף	543	1985
Keshet	קֶשֶׁת	979	1974
Kidmat Tzvi	קִדְמַת צְבִי	734	1981
Ma'ale Gamla	מַעֲלֵה גַּמְלָא	734	1975
Neot Golan	נְאוֹת גּוֹלָן	741	1968
Neve Ativ	נְוֵה אַטִי"ב	226	1972
Nov	נוֹב	1,192	1974
Odem	אֹדֶם	314	1975
Ramat Magshimim	רָמַת מַגְשִׁימִים	815	1968
Ramot	רָמוֹת	872	1969
Sha'al	שַׁעַל	451	1980
Yonatan	יוֹנָתָן	895	1975
Kela Alon	קלע אלון	414	1981, 1991
Had Ness	חַד נֵס	885	1989
