= Shahak Industrial Park =

Industrial park in the West Bank

Coordinates: 32°28′27″N 35°10′49″E

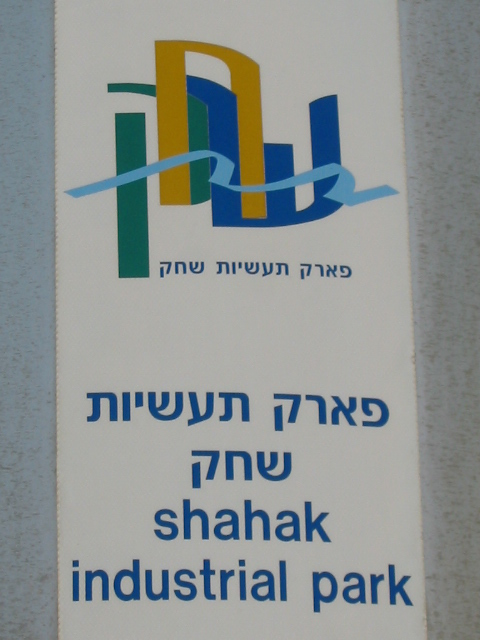
Signpost in the area

The Shahak Industrial Park (Hebrew: פארק תעשיות שח"ק) is located in the northern region of the jurisdiction of the Shomron Regional Council in the West Bank, Palestine, between Afula and Hadera near the 'Barkai/Iron Interchange' of Highway 6. The industrial park is adjacent to Israeli settlements Shaked, Hinanit in the West Bank, and Katzir across the Green Line in Israel, hence the initials making up the acronym in Hebrew that is the name of the park. The area is located within the Israeli West Bank barrier and employs Israelis, Palestinians and Arab citizens of Israel.

Established in 1998, the industrial park is focused on attracting and nurturing environmentally friendly initiatives and as of 2010 includes a few businesses and factories. In 2005, it was announced that three factories paid for infrastructure costs on 12 dunams.

In 2010, Tyreq opened Israel's first tire recycling plant in the park and it will be able to handle 35 000 tons of used tires.
