= Yair Farm =

Israeli settlement in the West Bank

Yair Farm: חוות יאיר (Hebrew)
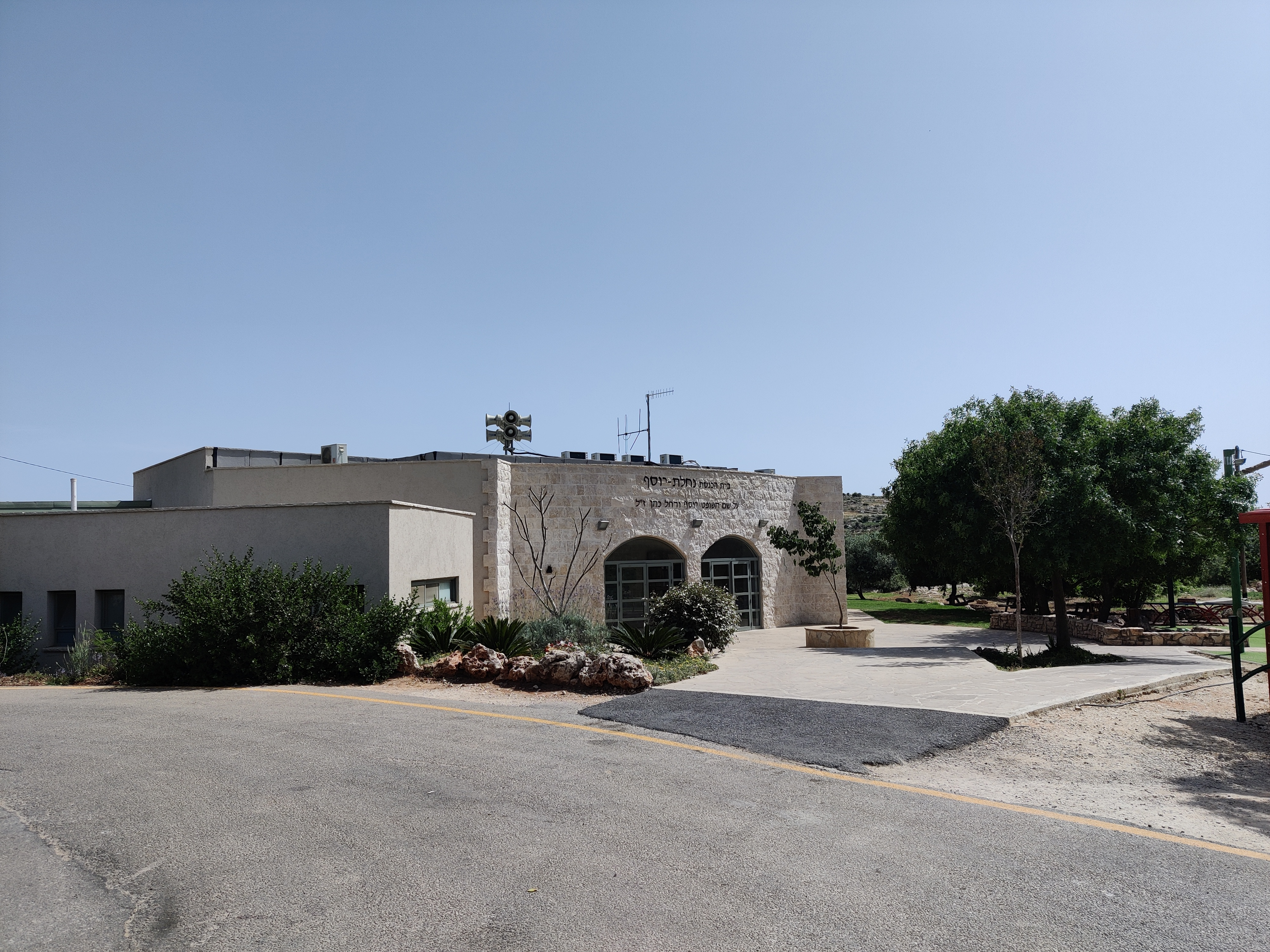
- Yair Farms Synagogue in 2021

- Location within the Northern West Bank Location within the West Bank Location within State of Palestine
- Coordinates: 32°08′40″N 35°06′15″E
- Country: Palestine
- Council: Shomron
- Region: West Bank
- Founded: 1999
- Website: havotyair.co.il

Yair Farm (Hebrew: חוות יאיר, romanized: Havot Yair) is an Israeli settlement in the West Bank, built as an illegal outpost in 1999 and legalized in 2021 by the Israeli government. Located near Nofim and Yakir, it falls under the jurisdiction of Shomron Regional Council. It is home to around 70 families.

The international community considers Israeli settlements in the West Bank illegal under international law, but the Israeli government disputes this.

== History ==
The village was first established in 1999 as an outpost and named after Avraham (Yair) Stern, leader of the pre-state underground militant group Lehi, though the community's website notes the name of Yair ben Menashe. Although it was later evacuated, it was re-established in February 2001. According to Peace Now, the parent settlement of this outpost is Yakir and 17,666 square metres (190,160 sq ft) of the area that this outpost is built on is expropriated private Palestinian land. The Sasson Report reported that the Israeli Ministry of Housing and Construction had allocated 1 million Israeli new shekels for the construction of several structures at the outpost.

In January 2021, the outpost was regulated by the Israeli government, which declared it "a neighborhood of the Yakir settlement".
