= Tal Menashe =

Tal Menashe: טל מנשה (Hebrew)
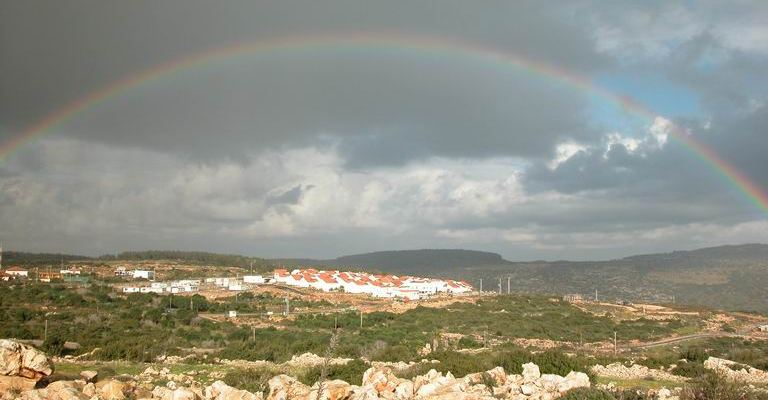
- Etymology: Dew of Manasseh
- Location within the Northern West Bank Location within the West Bank Location within State of Palestine
- Coordinates: 32°28′58″N 35°9′38″E
- Country: Palestine
- District: Judea and Samaria Area
- Council: Shomrom
- Region: West Bank
- Affiliation: Israeli
- Founded: 1999
- Founder: The Jewish Agency
- Population: 700
- Website: yeshuv.org/tal-menashe.html

Tal Menashe (Hebrew: טל מנשה, lit. Dew of Manasseh) is an Israeli settlement, formerly Israeli outpost, in the West Bank, retroactively legalized under Israeli law as an extension (suburb) of the Israeli settlement of Hinanit, located in the Samarian hills on the northwestern edge of the West Bank. The outpost, under the administrative municipal government of the Shomron Regional Council, is adjacent to Hinanit and Shaked. It was founded in 1992 as an Israeli outpost next to the settlement of Hinanit, and moved to it final land at 1999 on state lands nearby. It was founded by a group of Israelis from a kollel in Mevaseret Zion and from the Technion in Haifa.

The international community has stated that Israeli settlements in the West Bank are not legal under international law. Israel does not agree with this view and the position of successive Israeli governments is that all authorized settlements are legal and consistent with international law.

== History ==
It is named after the Biblical miracle of the dew, which Gideon experienced in this area (Judges 6:35-40), since it is located on land allotted to the Tribe of Manasseh. It is the only Orthodox Jewish settlement in the northern West Bank since other communities were destroyed as a result of Israel's unilateral disengagement plan.

In January 2021, Prime Minister Benjamin Netanyahu announced that Tal Menashe would be among the West Bank communities slated to have new homes constructed, along with Bet El, Giv'at Zeev, Rehelim, Shavei Shomron, Barkan and Karnei Shomron.

== Population growth ==
Approximately 150 families reside in Tal Menashe. The residents are engaged in a wide variety of occupations, including as high-tech employees, educators, social workers, building contractors, and traders, both salaried and self-employed. The community includes long-time Israeli residents as well as immigrants from France, Germany, the United States, South America, and the Commonwealth of Independent States.

== Culture ==
As part of the concept of integrating with the natural environment, several public parks have been established in Tal Menashe:

"Bustan Bereshit" - A park featuring a natural forest combined with plants mentioned in ancient sources: the Seven Species, Jotham's parable, the Hill of Song of Songs, and more. The park includes a picnic area and a viewpoint overlooking the region. Many bulbs were planted in the park, collected through a "bulb rescue" from construction areas.

"Shvil BaTeva" - A trail approximately 500 meters long, created in the natural and planted forest, featuring pine trees, oak trees, pistachio trees, and the blooming of various bulbs (anemone, cyclamen, iris, crocus, squill, and more).

"Shvil BaYa'ar" - A 3 km circular path that starts near the "Talalei Orot" school in the community.

There is also a petting zoo, primarily featuring goats and peacocks.

== Education ==
The population of Tal Menashe consists mostly of Religious Zionist Jews. The residents' lifestyle follows Jewish law, under the guidance of Rabbi Reuven Uziel, the local rabbi and the regional rabbi of North Samaria.

In Tal Menashe, there are educational institutions for early childhood, kindergartens, and a regional religious elementary school named "Talalei Orot," which has about 200 students. The school includes a 'Talmudic Garden,' where students participate in agricultural work, an active petting zoo, a computer room, and more. For secondary education, the girls attend an Ulpana in Pardes Hanna, and the boys attend a high school yeshiva in Harish, Yeshivat Bnei Akiva Kfar Haroeh, among others.

Since 2004, Tal Menashe operated a seminary for girls ("Midreshet Tal Menashe") for several years, which combined national service with Torah studies for the national service girls in the area. The seminary operated under the auspices of Rabbi Chaim Druckman, who lectured once a month at the seminary. Additionally, there is a branch of the Bnei Akiva youth movement.

== Religion ==
In Tal Menashe, there is one central synagogue where all prayer services are held. This is in line with the community's philosophy of unity and avoiding the proliferation and division of minyanim (prayer groups). The prayer service follows a mixed rite, determined by the cantor's choice. Every evening, there is a joint study session of the "Daf Yomi" in the Talmud. Additionally, there are classes given by the community rabbi, Rabbi Reuven Uziel, on the weekly Torah portion, Tanakh (Hebrew Bible), in-depth Talmud study, women's classes, and a weekly "Evening Study Session" for young children.

Currently, prayers are held in the "Tal-Ganim" synagogue, which was established by the Ministry of Defense from the remnants of the synagogue of the evacuated community of Ganim.

== Culture ==
In Tal Menashe, there is a women's mikveh, a library, and a "youth room" where weekly activities are held for each age group from 7th to 12th grade, led by the youth coordinator. The community hosts cultural events during holidays, Torah classes for children, activities in the library, and sports clubs for children. Additionally, there are women's evenings for the women of the community and the surrounding area.

== Gallery ==
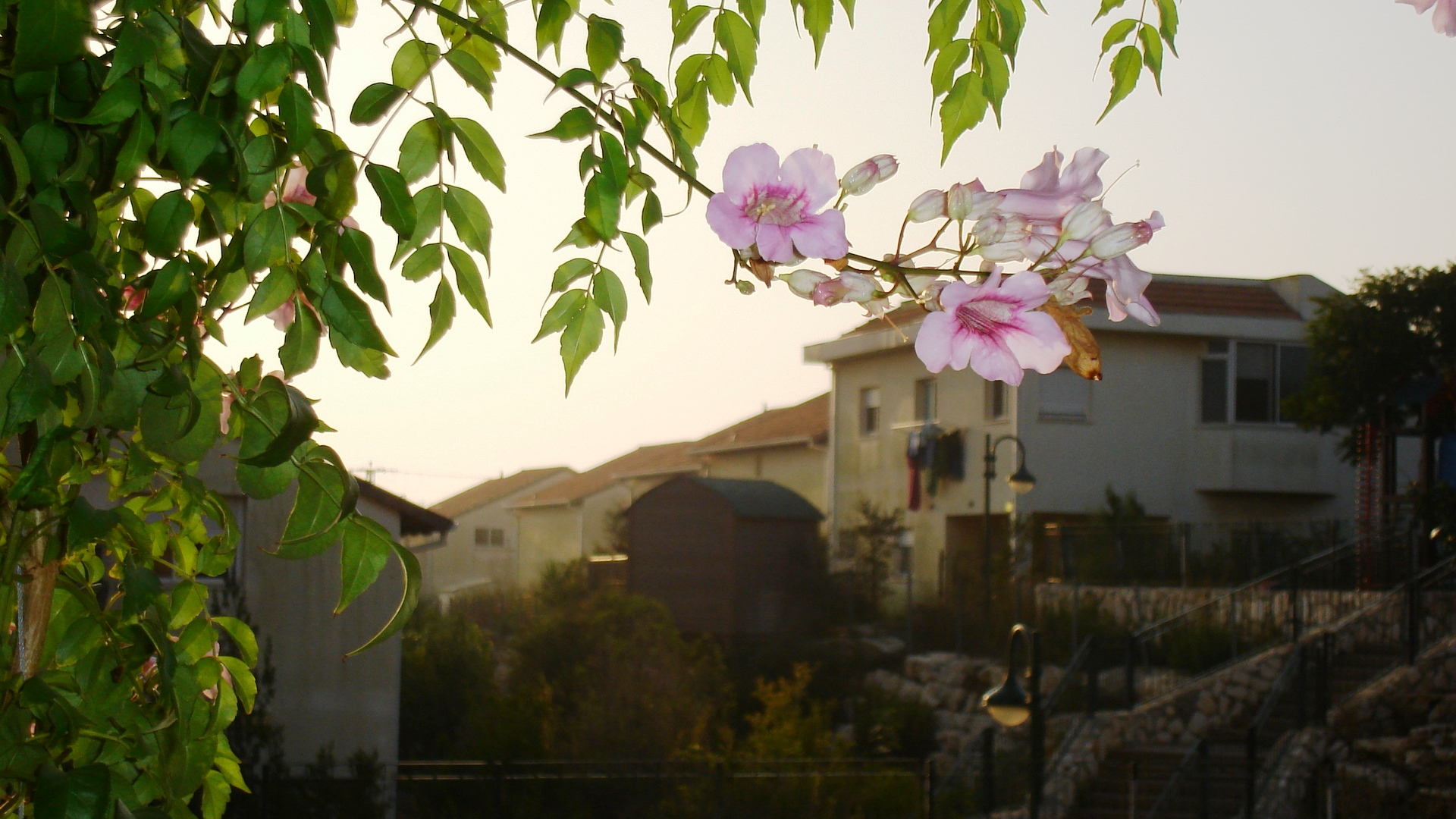

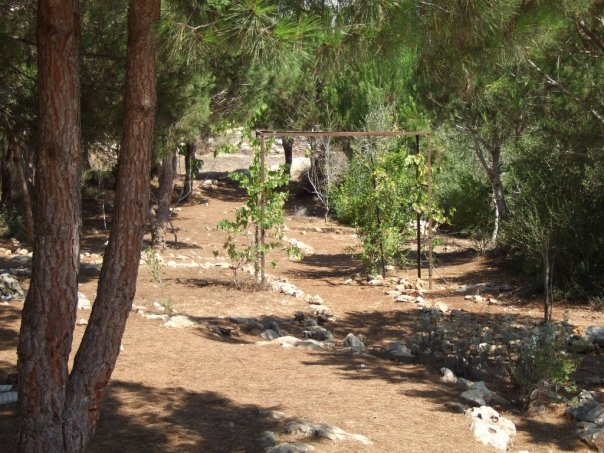

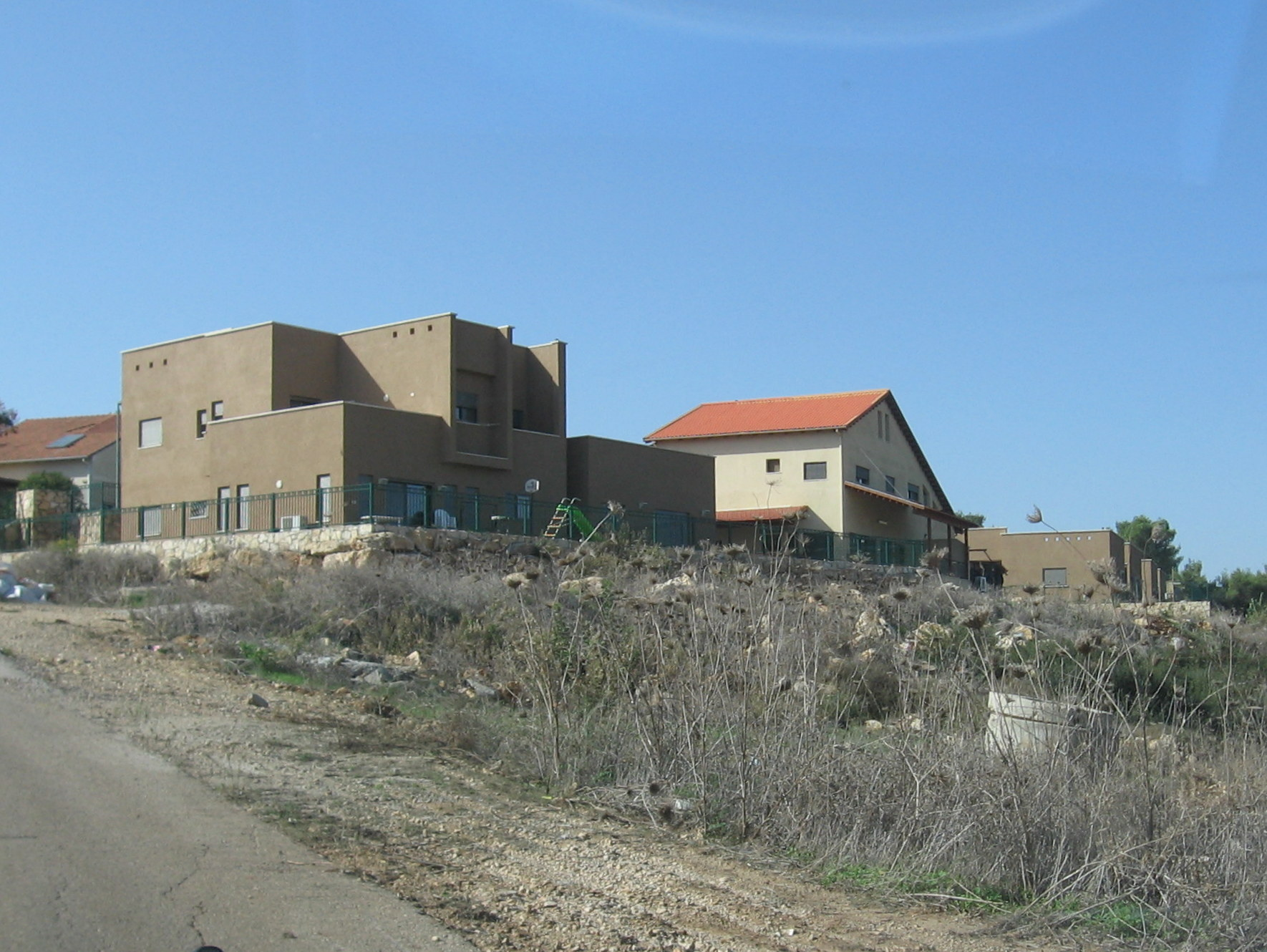
