= Barqan =

Barqan may refer to

- Barkan, an Israeli settlement in the West Bank
- Qasr-e Qand, a city in Iran
