= Revava =

Israeli settlement in the West Bank

Revava: רְבָבָה (Hebrew)
- Israeli settlement
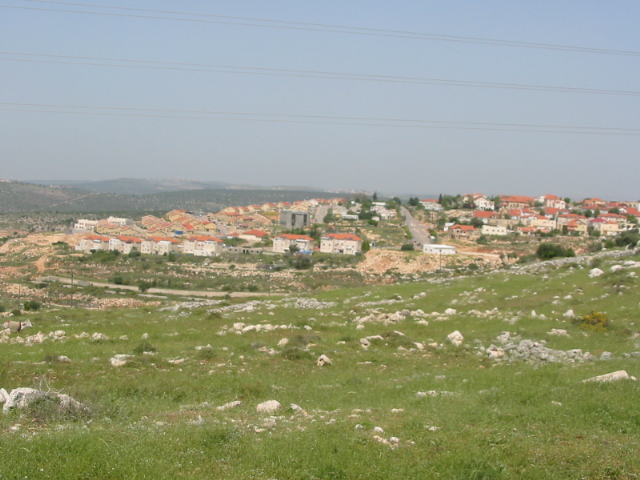
- Etymology: Ten Thousand
- Location within the Northern West Bank
- Coordinates: 32°7′8″N 35°7′43″E
- Country: Palestine
- District: Judea and Samaria Area
- Council: Shomron
- Region: West Bank
- Affiliation: Amana
- Founded: 1991
- Population (2024): 3,202

Revava (Hebrew: רְבָבָה), is an Orthodox Jewish Israeli settlement in the West Bank. Located to the northwest of Ariel, it falls under the jurisdiction of Shomron Regional Council. In 2024, it had a population of 3,202.

The international community considers Israeli settlements in the West Bank illegal under international law, but the Israeli government disputes this.

== Etymology ==
The word "revava" in Hebrew means "ten thousand". The name was chosen based on the biblical verse: "And they blessed Rebekah, and said to her: Our sister, you will be the mother of thousands of ten thousands, and let your seed possess the gate of those that hate them" (Genesis 24:60). In addition, the area in question was allotted to the Israelite tribe of Ephraim: "And they are the ten thousands of Ephraim, and they are the thousands of Manasseh" (Deuteronomy 33:17).

== History ==
According to ARIJ, Israel confiscated land from two nearby Palestinian villages in order to construct Revava:

- 335 dunams were taken from Deir Istiya
- 304 dunams were taken from Haris

Revava was established in the spring of 1991 in a central location, at a location about half an hour east of Petah Tikva, near Ariel and the Barkan industrial zone. The property was purchased in the 1980s by the Fund for Redeeming the Land. The first families settled on the site in fourteen trailers on the eve of Israeli Independence Day. The main synagogue in Revava is Revavot Ephraim.

In 2010, after a 10-month construction slowdown expired, work began on the construction of a kindergarten in Revava. At a celebration rally, residents released 2,000 blue and white balloons, the colors of the Israeli flag, to symbolize a new wave of housing construction. The rally was also attended by hundreds of Christians from all over the world who were visiting Israel to take part in the annual Feast of Tabernacles celebration of the International Christian Zionist Center. Ayoub Kara, an Israeli Druze member of Knesset and Deputy Minister for development of the Negev and Galilee, spoke at the rally. He welcomed the tourists saying: "I say to all the non-Jews who are here, I too am not a Jew, but in spirit I am most Jewish, I am most Zionist, and so are you! Good for you that you are here to support Israel.

In 2011, a permanent synagogue was established.

In 2012, a larger grocery was established in addition to a pizza restaurant.

In 2013, a clinic of the Maccabi Health Fund was established, with three staff physicians.

== Legal conflicts ==
According to Zionist Organization of America, in 2008, the Israeli courts found Peace Now guilty of publishing false statements regarding ownership of the land. According to a Peace Now report, 71.15 percent of the land was "stolen from Arabs." When the organization refused to abide by the court order to apologize, the fund that purchased the property sued, charging Peace Now and the authors of the false report for slander. The judge found them guilty. They were ordered to issue an apology in Maariv and Haaretz newspapers and pay monetary compensation to the fund. ZOA National President, Morton Klein called on Jewish organizations, the Israeli government and journalists to publicly condemn Peace Now for promoting lies and falsehoods.

On May 24, 2020, Israeli settlers from the Revava settlement, located on the lands of Haris, northwest of Salfit Governorate, uprooted and stolen more than 150–200 olive trees.

== Education and culture ==
Revava has 7 preschool/kindergartens and a daycare center for children up to age 3. A middle school and high school for girls, part of the Tzvia chain of high schools, is located in Revava. Boys study at elementary schools in Yakir, Karnei Shomron and Itamar. Girls usually study at the elementary school in Yakir. A local elementary school based in Revava is being opened in the Autumn of 2012.

The Bnei Akiva youth movement has a branch in Revava.

From 2001 to 2006, Revava had a boys' baseball team.
