= Mishkei Herut Beitar =

Israeli movement

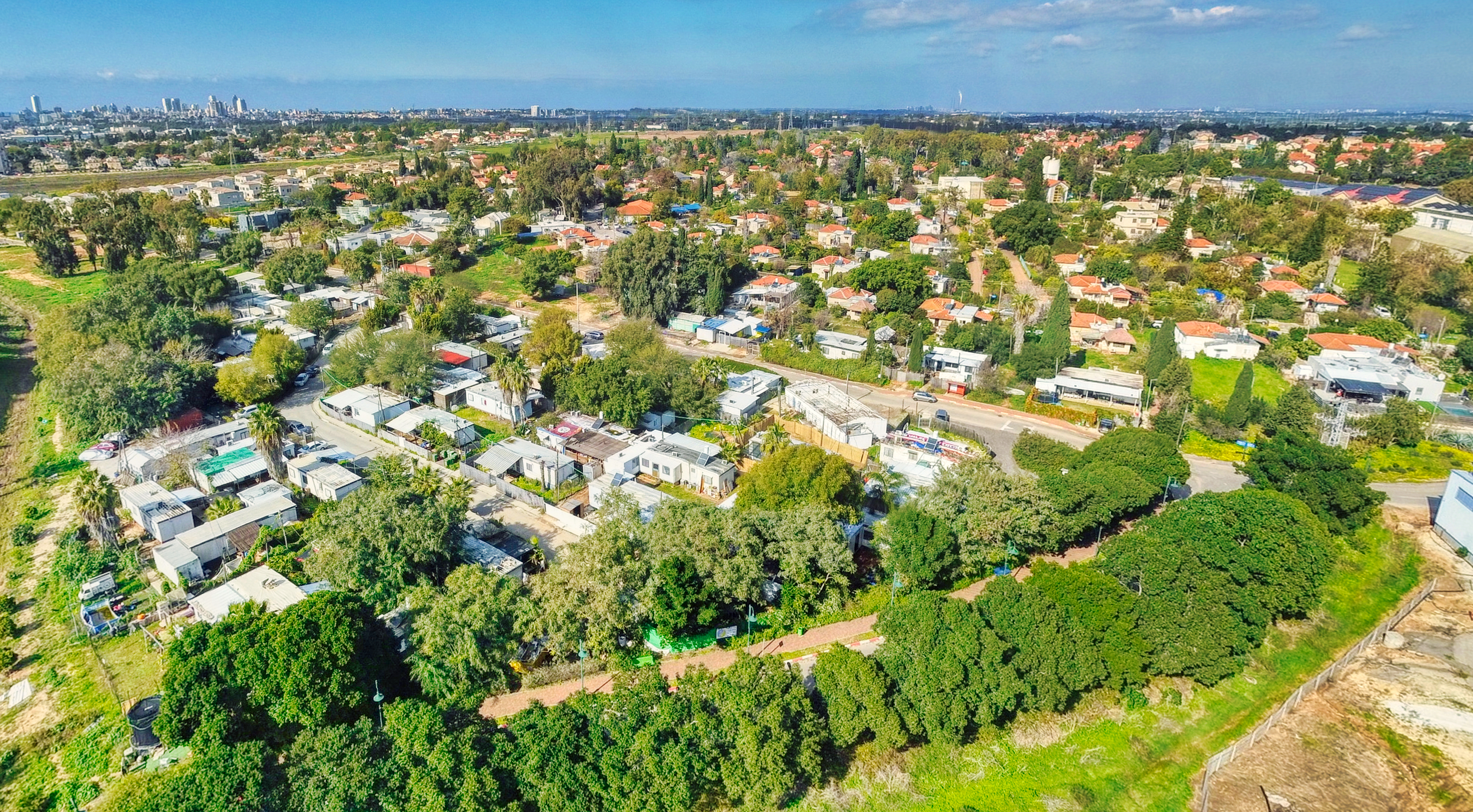
Nordia

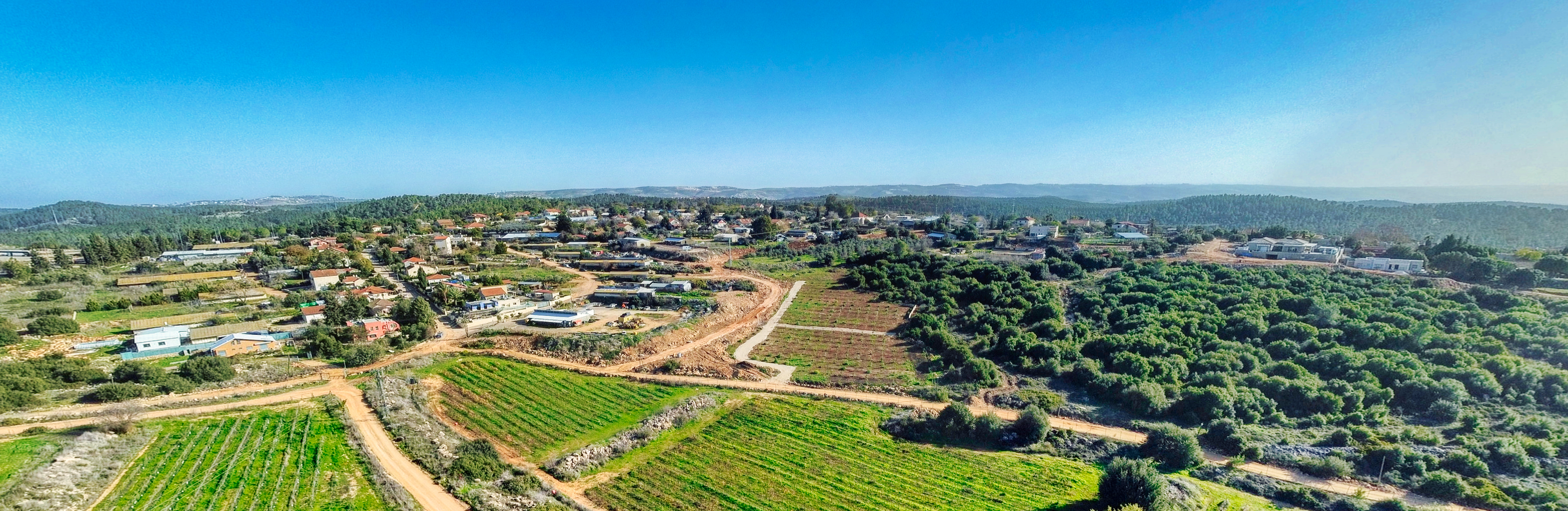
Bar Giora

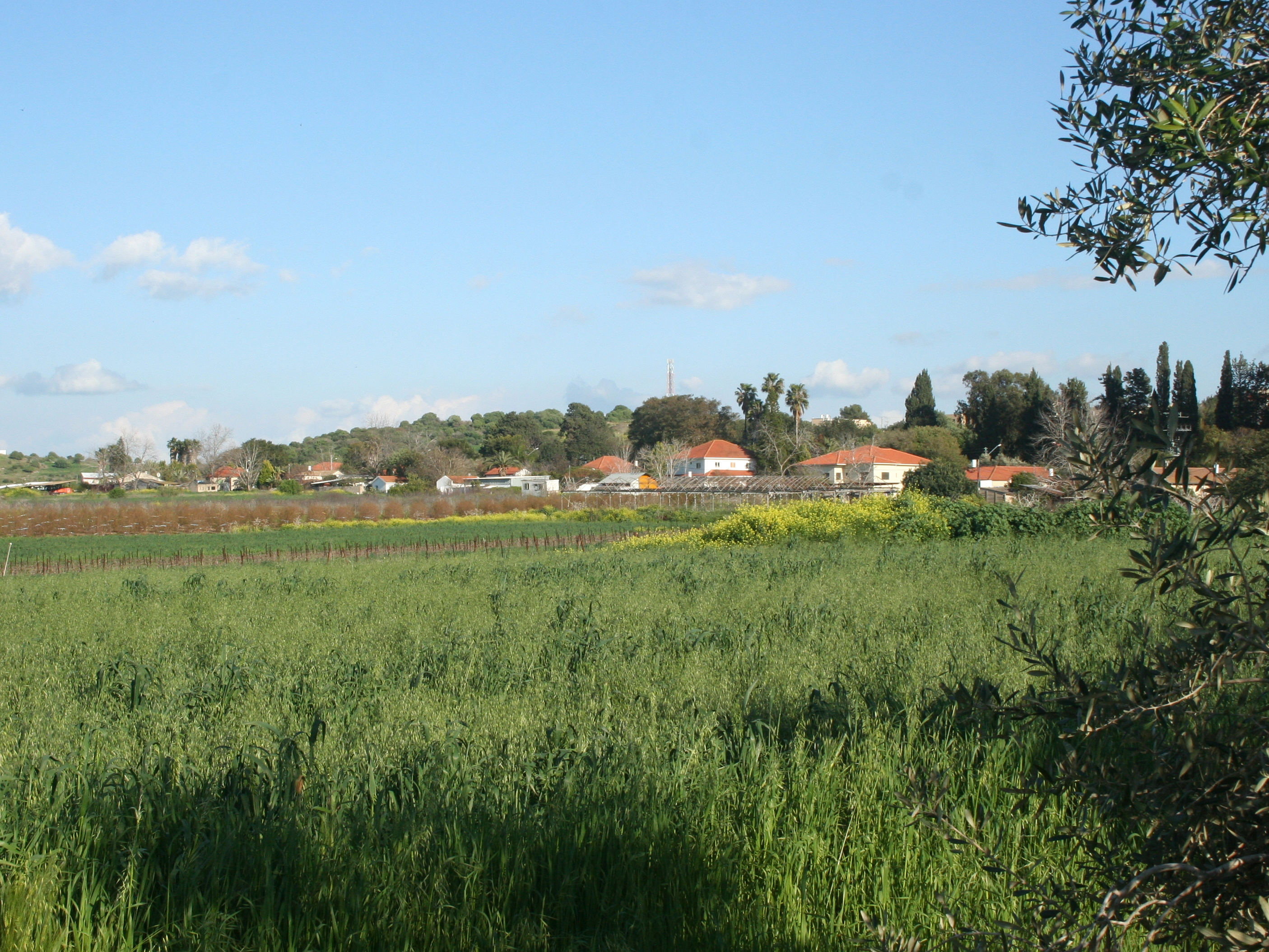
Aviel

Mishkei Herut Beitar (Hebrew: משקי חרות בית״ר) is a revisionist Zionist settlement movement in Israel, affiliated with Beitar and Likud. It is based in the Metzudat Ze'ev offices on King George Street in Tel Aviv.

== History ==
Early Mishkei Herut Beitar settlements were established by members of the Platoon of the Wall brigade of Beitar. The first was Ramat Tyomkin (now part of Netanya) in 1932, followed by Tel Tzur near Zikhron Ya'akov. The movement was affiliated with the Herut party, which later merged into Likud. Due to ideological differences with other settlements, most of which were affiliated with Labor Zionism, in one case a separate regional council, Alona, was created for the three Herut Beitar settlements in Haifa District.

Many of the organisation's settlements were built in the 1980s, most of which are Israeli settlements in the West Bank and Golan Heights.

== Member communities ==
- Adora (1982)^{[a]}
- Alei Zahav (1983)^{[a]}
- Amatzia (1955)
- Amikam (1950)
- Argaman (1968)^{[a]}
- Aviel (1949)
- Bar Giora (1950)
- Barkan (1981)^{[a]}
- Gilon (1980)
- Gitit (1972)^{[a]}
- Givat Nili (1953)
- Had Nes (1989)^{[a]}
- Hermesh (1984)
- Homesh (1978)^{[a]}
- Hosen (1949)
- Kedar (1984)
- Kela Alon (1981)^{[a]}
- Ma'ale Amos (1981)^{[a]}
- Ma'ale Shomron (1980)^{[a]}
- Mevo Beitar (1950)
- Misgav Dov (1950)
- Mishmar HaYarden (1949)
- Nordia (1948)
- Ramat Raziel (1948)
- Sal'it (1979)^{[a]}
- Sha'al (1980)^{[a]}
- Shaked (1981)^{[a]}
- Sha'arei Tikva (1983)^{[a]}
- Shekef (1981)
- Telem (1982)^{[a]}
- Tzur Natan (1966)
- Tzurit (1981)

^{a} Israeli settlement

Former members include Neot Sinai, an abandoned Israeli settlement in the Sinai Peninsula and Ganim, Homesh and Kadim, abandoned settlements in the West Bank.
