= Roi Yozevitch =

- 'רועי יוזביץ
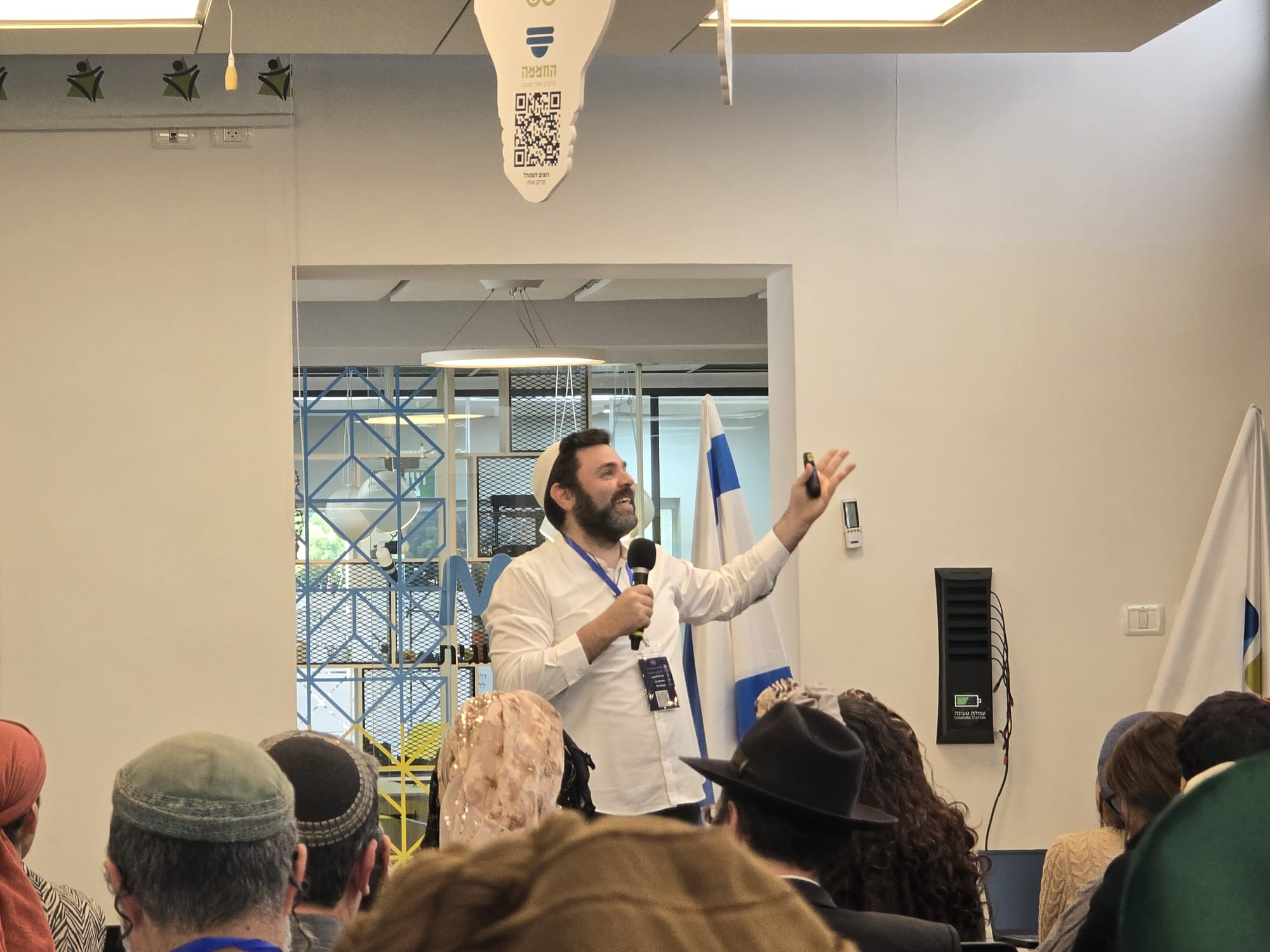
- Yozevitch 2026
- Born: April 30, 1982
- Education: Tel Aviv University, Ariel University
- Known for: Author, lecturer, Researcher
- Scientific career
- Fields: Electronic engineering, Computer science
- Doctoral advisor: Boaz Ben-Moshe

Roi Yozevitch (Hebrew: 'רועי יוזביץ; born 30 April 1982) is an Israeli interdisciplinary author, lecturer, and researcher. He holds a PhD in electronic engineering and computer science, and is known to the general public for his lectures, educational videos, and books on excellence and education.

== Biography ==
Yozevitch was born in Israel and served as an officer in the Israeli Air Force between 2005 and 2008. He earned a bachelor's degree in electronic engineering from Tel Aviv University. In 2018, he received his PhD in electrical and computer engineering from Ariel University, under the supervision of Professor Boaz Ben-Moshe.

Since 2012, Yozevitch has been a lecturer at Ariel University. He previously served as project manager of Israel's first social nanosatellite initiative, as part of the KCG Laboratory at Ariel University.

His research interests include artificial intelligence, improving GPS accuracy, enhancing the effectiveness of psychological assessment, and improving learning skills. In 2017, he was awarded a Wolf Foundation scholarship for one of his research projects.

In parallel with his academic work, Yozevitch lectures at conferences and workshops for companies and organizations, focusing on artificial intelligence, excellence, and online learning. He also delivers public lectures and science outreach programs for youth. Between 2010 and 2018, he collaborated closely with the Atidim program of the Branco Weiss Institute, primarily in initiatives promoting educational advancement among youth from Israel's social and geographic periphery.

Since 2005, Yozevitch has also performed in stage productions involving mentalism and sensory illusion.

== Books ==
- Big Mind: Achievement, Enjoyment, and the Impossible (Hebrew), Ludi Publishing, 2007
- The Education Revolution (Hebrew), Yedioth Books, 2017
- Intelligence: The Unpleasant Truth (Hebrew), Ludi Publishing, 2019
- Academic Success (Hebrew), Ludi Publishing, 2021.

== Online courses ==
In 2020, Yozevitch launched a massive open online course titled Navigation and Localization Algorithms on the Campus IL platform. In 2021, the course was released globally on edX under the title Bayesian Algorithms for Self-Driving Vehicles.

== Media activity ==
Yozevitch hosts a philosophical podcast in which he interviews scientists and intellectuals.

In addition, he delivers a weekly lecture series on Guide for the Perplexed by Maimonides, which is published on YouTube and podcast platforms.

== Personal life ==
Yozevitch is married and the father of four children. He resides in Nofim.
