= Givat Arnon =

Coordinates: 32.1536°N 35.3675°E

Givat Arnon (גבעת ארנון)
- Country: Israel
- District: Judea and Samaria Area
- Council: Shomron
- Region: West Bank
- Founded: 1999, legalized in 2023
- Founder: Members of the Hayl

Givat Arnon (Hebrew: גבעת ארנון), formerly referred to as Hill 777, is an Israeli settlement in the West Bank, a 12-kilometer drive from Itamar, under the jurisdiction of the Shomron Regional Council, 28 km inside the Green Line.

The international community considers Israeli settlements in the West Bank illegal under international law, but the Israeli government disputes this.

== History ==
The Hill 777 outpost was founded in 1999. Despite being 5.6 km from Itamar, it was originally an outpost of Itamar.

The name Givat Arnon was given in memory of Aryeh Agranioni. In May 2001, Agranioni was guarding a railway container housing agricultural equipment on Hill 777. While on guard, he was murdered with his own gun.

Originally, Hill 777 was an unrecognized outpost, and in 2000 were forced to evacuate, and the residents moved to Hill 830. The murder of Agranioni helped accelerate the issuing of a military permit enabling the Hill 777 outpost. Residents returned home to Hill 777 only one year after leaving.

On February 12, 2023, the Israeli government legalized Givat Arnon.

== Population ==
Currently, there are 7 families living in Givat Arnon. These residents are currently living in 6 caravans and a container.
