= Ma'ale Hever =

Israeli settlement in the West Bank

Ma'ale Hever: מַעֲלֵה חֶבֶר (Hebrew)
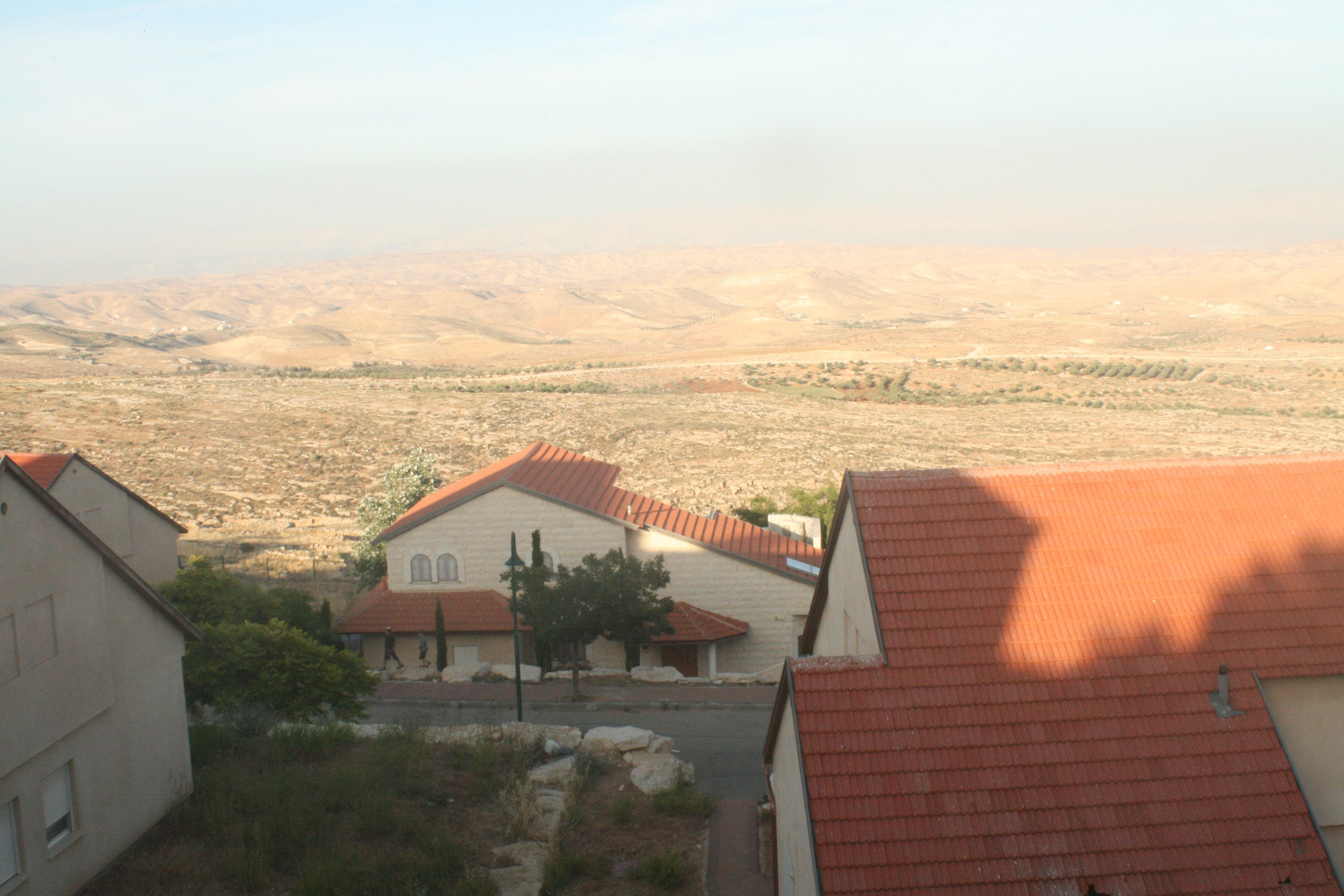

- Location within the Southern West Bank
- Coordinates: 31°29′10″N 35°9′58″E
- Country: Palestine
- District: Judea and Samaria Area
- Council: Har Hevron
- Region: West Bank
- Affiliation: Amana
- Founded: 1982
- Population (2024): 600

Ma'ale Hever (Hebrew: מַעֲלֵה חֶבֶר) or Pnei Hever (Hebrew: פְּנֵי חֶבֶר) is an Israeli settlement in the West Bank. Located in the eastern Hebron Hills to the east of Hebron at an elevation of 810 m (2,660 ft), it is organised as a community settlement and falls under the jurisdiction of Har Hevron Regional Council. It overlooks the wilderness of Ziff and the Dead Sea Valley. In 2024 it had a population of 600.

The international community considers Israeli settlements in the West Bank to be illegal under international law. For several decades, the Israeli government has disputed this, claiming the Palestinian territories were not under the legitimate sovereignty of any state prior to their capture by Israel during the Six-Day War in 1967.

== History ==
The settlement was established as Nahal Yakin on 31 January 1982 as a pioneer Nahal military outpost. It was demilitarized when turned over to eleven families on 24 August 1983, after which it was renamed after the nearby Hever Stream. In its early years, the only route leading to the village passed through the Palestinian town of Bani Na'im.

In 2009, Assaf Ramon, son of Israeli astronaut Ilan Ramon who was aboard the fatal Columbia mission when the Space Shuttle exploded, was killed when the F-16 he was flying crashed in the vicinity of Ma'ale Hever.

In 2019, a new Kollel, led by Rabbi Haim Klein, was built to teach necessary courses to rabbis to be community leaders.

== Notable residents ==
- Gidon Ariel, founder and CEO of Root Source
