= Reihan =

Israeli settlement in the West Bank

Reihan: רֵיחָן (Hebrew)
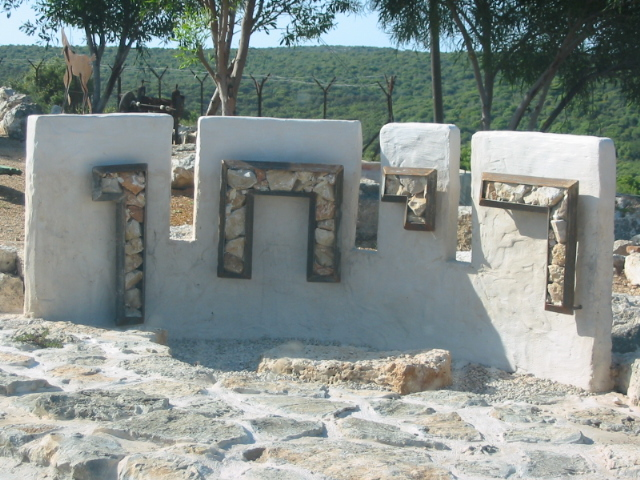
- Welcoming sign at entrance to the village

- Location within the Northern West Bank
- Coordinates: 32°28′8″N 35°8′6″E
- Country: Palestine
- District: Judea and Samaria Area
- Council: Shomron
- Region: West Bank
- Affiliation: HaOved HaTzioni
- Founded: 1977
- Founder: Jewish Agency
- Population (2024): 524

Reihan (Hebrew: רֵיחָן) is an Israeli settlement organized as a moshav ovdim in the northwest edge of the West Bank. Located in the Seam Zone close to the Green Line, it falls under the jurisdiction of Shomron Regional Council. In 2024, it had a population of 524.

The international community considers Israeli settlements in the West Bank illegal under international law, but the Israeli government disputes this.

== Geography ==
The settlement is located on a west-facing hillside at 387 metres above sea level, south of the Ta'anakh and the biblical city of the same name, and east of Barta'a. Reihan is today home to 200, including 52 families, and it operates a tree nursery and poultry farm.

== History ==
The moshav was established in 1977 as a Nahal outpost and populated in 1981 by civilian members of a Labour Zionist group. It is located in the "Shaked bloc", meant to ensure contiguous Israeli presence between the strategic Highway 65 and Palestinian population centres.
