= Migdalim =

Israeli settlement in the West Bank

Migdalim: מִגְדָּלִים (Hebrew)
- Israeli settlement
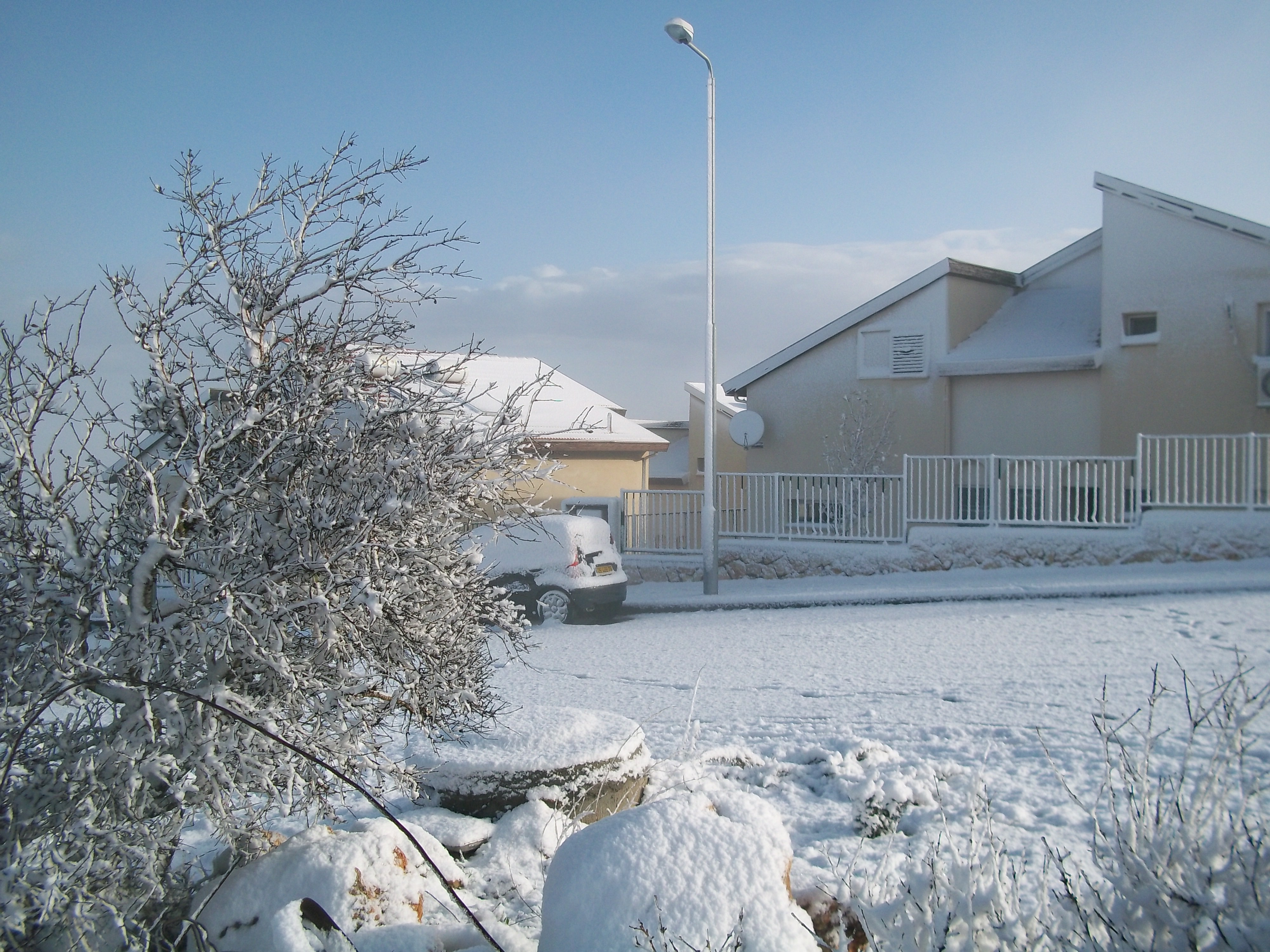
- Etymology: Towers
- Location within the Northern West Bank
- Coordinates: 32°5′25″N 35°20′32″E
- Country: Palestine
- District: Judea and Samaria Area
- Council: Shomrom
- Region: West Bank
- Affiliation: Amana
- Founded: 1984
- Founder: Nahal
- Population (2024): 790

Migdalim (Hebrew: מִגְדָּלִים) is an Israeli settlement in the West Bank. Located 45 kilometres east of Tel Aviv on road 505 and adjacent to the Palestinian village of Qusra, it is organised as a community settlement and falls under the jurisdiction of Shomron Regional Council. In 2024 it had a population of 790.

The international community considers Israeli settlements in the West Bank illegal under international law, but the Israeli government disputes this.

== History ==
According to ARIJ, Israel confiscated land from two Palestinian villages nearby in order to construct Migdalim:

- 177 dunums of land was confiscated from Qusra
- 17 dunums were confiscated from Jurish.

Migdalim was first established in 1984 as a pioneer Nahal military outpost, and demilitarized when turned over to residential purposes in 1986 to non-Orthodox Jewish Israelis. One of the reasons for choosing this location was to provide a continuity of settlements along the Trans-Samaria Highway between Kfar Tapuah on the "mountain spine" and Ma'ale Efrayim in the Jordan Valley.

On March 1, 2006, Eldad Abir, a resident of Migdalim, married with two children, was shot at point blank range and killed by Palestinians while working in the local gas station. The Fatah Al-Aqsa Martyrs' Brigades claimed responsibility for the murder.

An influx of new residents between 2012 and 2017 dramatically changed the demographics of Migdalim which shifted from being a dominantly secular Israeli community to becoming mix of religious and nonreligious, with majority leaning to the first. Events around hostilities with neighboring Palestinian town Qusra in December 2017 brought to light internal disputes between the two groups in Migdalim. A Facebook group called “Saving Migdalim” was formed by residents who claim that their town was taken over and its non religious atmosphere has changed as result.
