= Gilon =

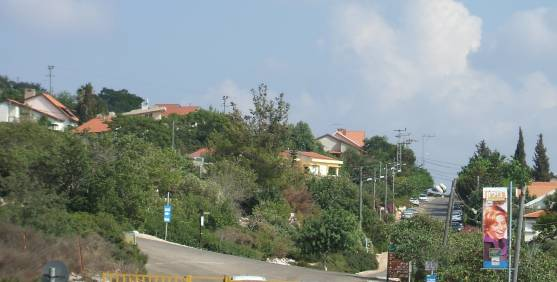

- Location within Northwest Israel
- Coordinates: 32°54′10″N 35°14′10″E
- Country: Israel
- District: Northern
- Subdistrict: Acre
- Council: Misgav
- Affiliation: Mishkei Herut Beitar
- Founded: 1980
- Founder: Mishkei Herut Beitar
- Population (2024): 1,202

Gilon (Hebrew: גִּילוֹן) is a community settlement in northern Israel. Located in the Lower Galilee on Mount Gilon seven kilometres west of Karmiel, it falls under the jurisdiction of Misgav Regional Council. In 2024 it had a population of 1,202.

== History ==
The village was established in 1980 by the Mishkei Herut Beitar movement as part of the Galilee lookouts plan to increase Jewish settlement in the area.
