= Tzofim =

Israeli settlement in the West Bank

Tzufim: צוּפִים / צוּפִין (Hebrew)

Hebrew transcription(s)
  - Official: Tzufim
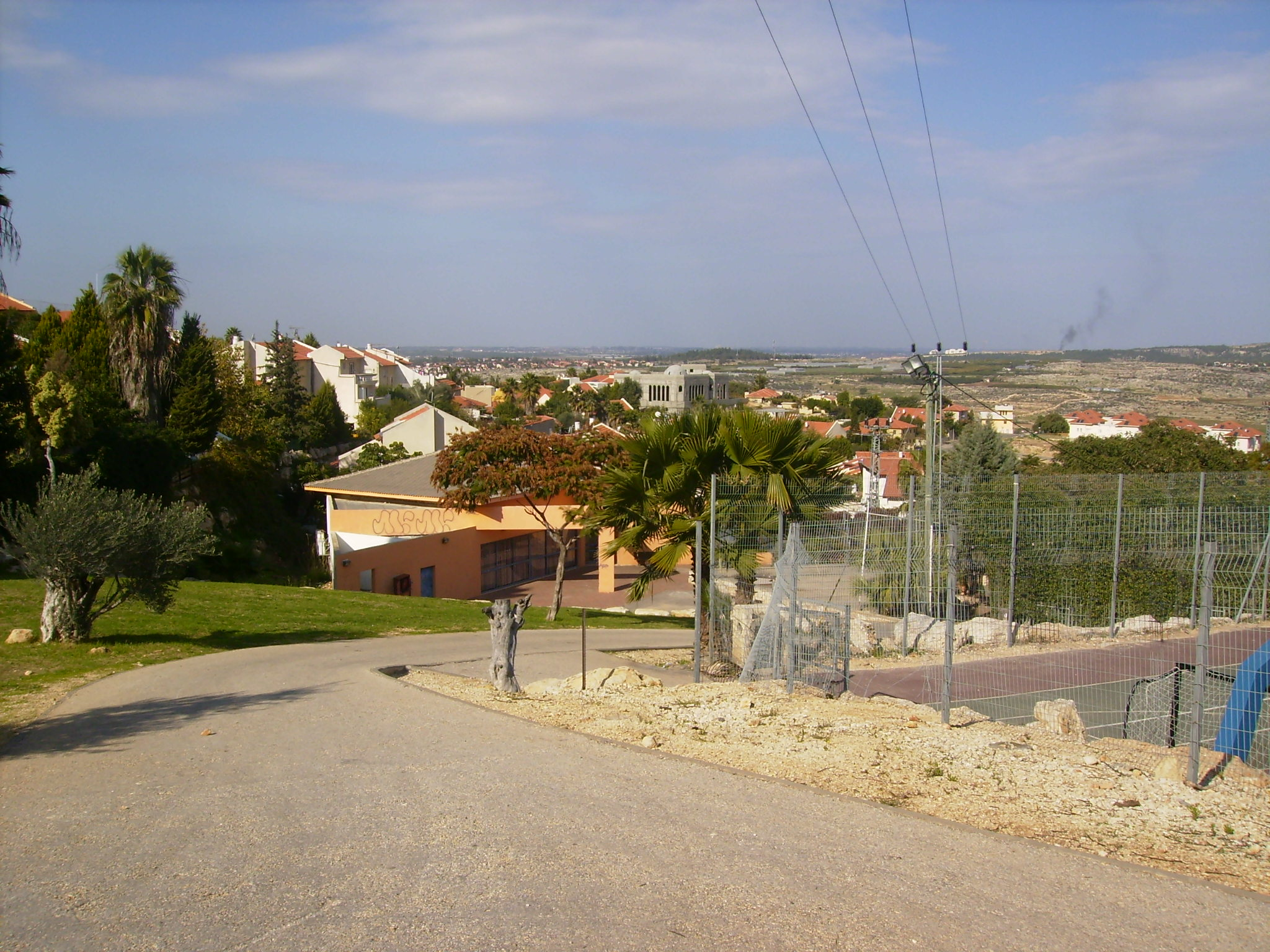

- Location within the Northern West Bank
- Coordinates: 32°11′53″N 35°0′33″E
- Country: Palestine
- District: Judea and Samaria Area
- Council: Shomron
- Region: West Bank
- Founded: 1989
- Population (2024): 2,605

Tzufim (Hebrew: צוּפִים), or Tzufin (צוּפִין), is an Israeli settlement in the West Bank. Located north of Alfei Menashe and Qalqilyah and northeast of Kfar Saba, it is organised as a community settlement and falls under the jurisdiction of Shomron Regional Council. In 2024 it had a population of 2,605.

The international community considers Israeli settlements in the West Bank illegal under international law, but the Israeli government disputes this.

== History ==
Tsofim takes its name from the neighboring ancient village of Sufin (ِArabic: صوفين), an inhabited site during the early Ottoman period, and today a neighborhood of modern Qalqiliya.

According to ARIJ, Israel confiscated 753 dunums of land from the Palestinian village of Jayyus in order to construct Tzofim.

Tzufim was established in 1989 with assistance from the Amana settlement organization. The population is made up of a mixed group of Orthodox and non-religious Israelis.

The village is located in an area described as the seam zone and its proximity to the Green Line (less than 2 kilometres east of it) and its similar proximity to the Palestinian town of Qalqilyah has made its inclusion on the Israeli side of the West Bank barrier controversial, especially as the looping nature of the barrier's path forms a quasi-enclave of some Arab villages to its south.
