= Nili (Israeli settlement) =

Israeli settlement in the West Bank

Nili: נִילִ"י (Hebrew)
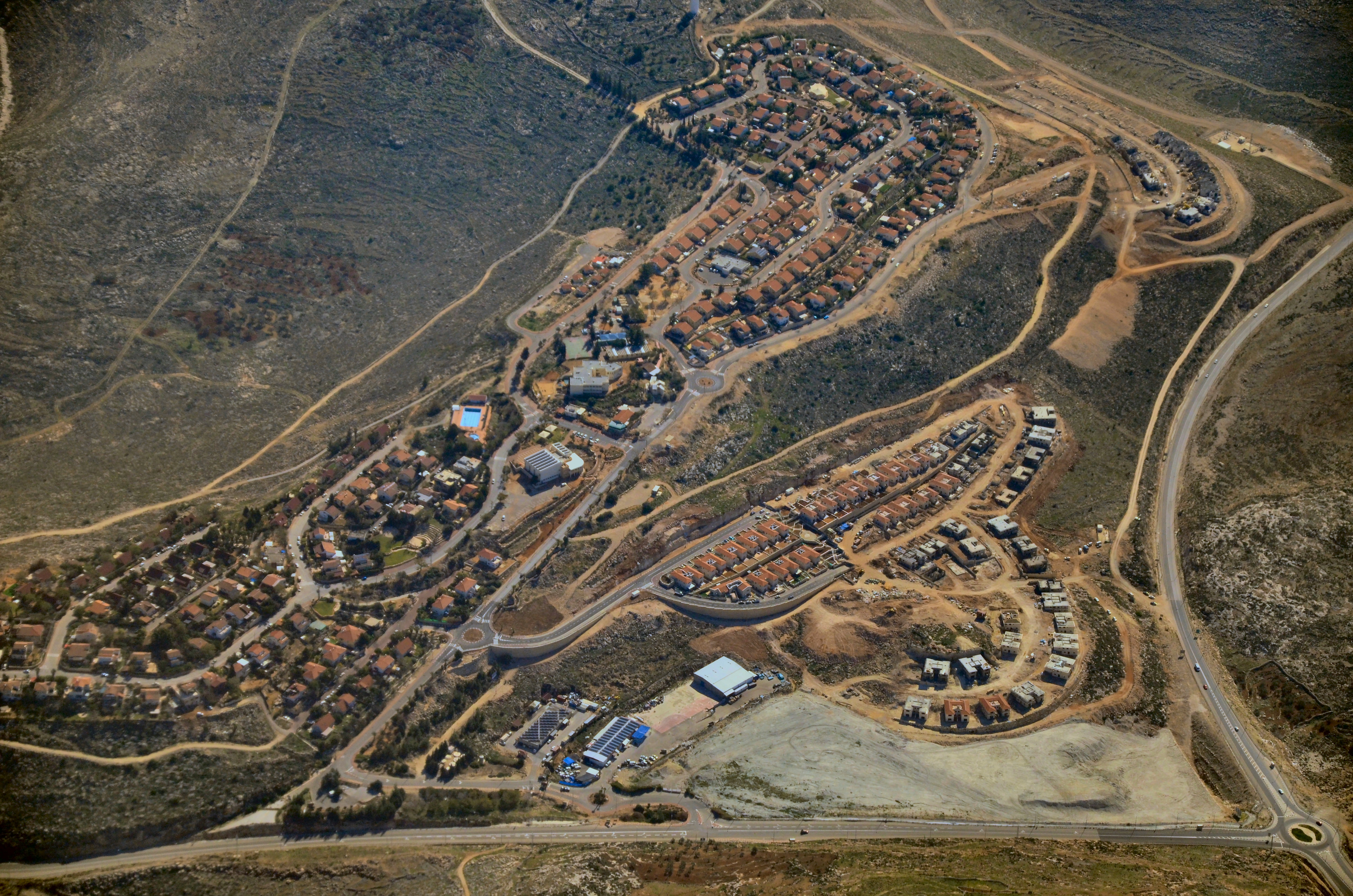

- Location within the Central West Bank Location within the West Bank Location within State of Palestine
- Coordinates: 31°57′49″N 35°2′51″E
- Country: Palestine
- District: Judea and Samaria Area
- Council: Mateh Binyamin
- Region: West Bank
- Affiliation: Amana
- Founded: 1981
- Population (2024): 2,262

Nili (Hebrew: נִילִ"י) is an Israeli settlement in the West Bank. Located 3.8 kilometres east of the Green line and a few hundred metres from the Palestinian village of Deir Qaddis, it is organised as a community settlement and falls under the jurisdiction of Mateh Binyamin Regional Council. In 2024 it had a population of 2,262.

The international community considers Israeli settlements in the West Bank illegal under international law, but the Israeli government disputes this.

== Etymology ==
The settlement was named after the Jewish espionage network NILI, an acronym of a phrase נצח ישראל לא ישקר (I Samuel 15:29; transliteration: Netzakh Yisrael Lo Yishaker, literal translation: "The Eternal One of Israel does not lie"), which assisted the United Kingdom in its fight against the Ottoman Empire in the Land of Israel during World War I.

== History ==
The settlement was established in 1981. The land it is built on was defined as state land, but residents of the village of Deir Qaddis claim the land was theirs and that they have documents to prove it. In December 2010, a request they filed to halt construction to expand the settlement of Nili was denied by the Supreme Court of Israel. Adopting a nonviolent tactic, residents of Deir Qaddis have organized daily marches to Nili. In June 2011, after a group of young Palestinians clashed with Israeli soldiers, army jeeps were stationed in the area to prevent the Palestinian villagers from entering the settlement.
