= Yakir =

Israeli settlement in the West Bank

Yakir: יַקִּיר (Hebrew)
- Village emblem
- Etymology: Dear, Darling
- Location within the Northern West Bank
- Coordinates: 32°9′1″N 35°6′55″E
- Country: Palestine
- District: Judea and Samaria Area
- Council: Shomron
- Region: West Bank
- Affiliation: Amana
- Founded: 1981
- Population (2024): 2,742

Yakir (Hebrew: יַקִּיר) is an Israeli settlement in the West Bank, 15 kilometers (9.3 mi) southwest of the Palestinian city of Nablus, near Revava and Nofim, on Road 5066, roughly between Barkan and Karnei Shomron. Organised as a community settlement, it was founded in February 1981 on lands that the Israeli government expropriated from the nearby Palestinian village of Deir Istiya. It sits at 420 metres above sea level and is under the jurisdiction of Shomron Regional Council. In 2024, it had a population of 2,742.

The international community considers Israeli settlements in the West Bank illegal under international law, but the Israeli government disputes this.

== Etymology ==
The name is taken from a passage in the Book of Jeremiah (31:20) 'Is Ephraim a darling (yakir) son unto Me?'"

== History ==
According to ARIJ, Israel confiscated 659 dunams of land from the nearby Palestinian village of Deir Istiya in order to construct Yakir.

The settlement was established in 1981. As of 2013, the property was being developed to accommodate a growing need for housing in the town.

In March 2013, a stone-throwing attack on traffic in the neighbouring village of Kif el-Hares led to the injury of a child, Adele Biton, who later died of her injuries.

On June 5, 2024, settlers from Yakir and neighbouring Novim bulldozed Palestinian land to create a fenced buffer zone as part of the Gaza war.
