= Etz Efraim =

Israeli settlement in the West Bank

Etz Efraim: עֵץ אֶפְרַיִם (Hebrew)
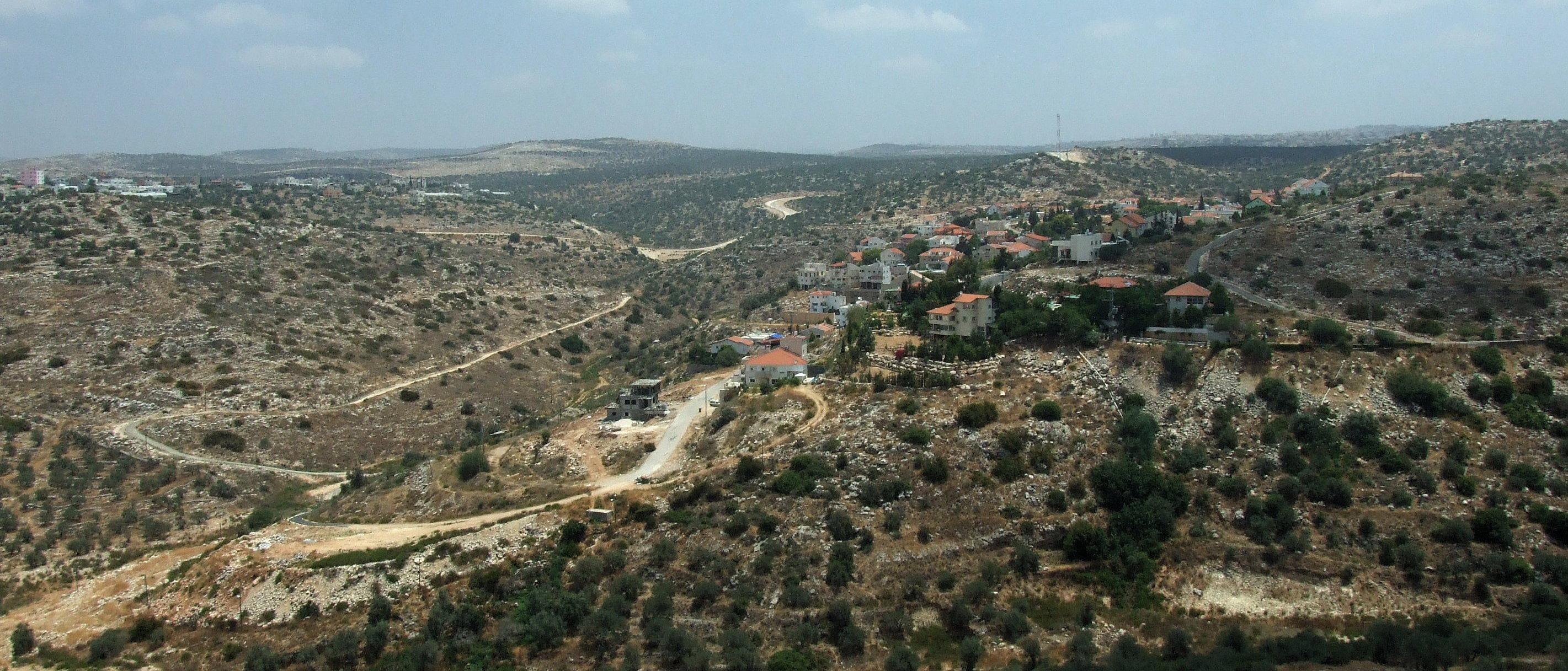

- Location within the Northern West Bank
- Coordinates: 32°7′8″N 35°2′48″E
- Country: Palestine
- District: Judea and Samaria Area
- Council: Shomron
- Region: West Bank
- Founded: 1985
- Founder: Shkhunot BeYosh members
- Population (2021): 2,519

Etz Efraim (Hebrew: עֵץ אֶפְרַיִם, lit. 'Tree of Ephraim') is a mixed (religious and nonreligious) Israeli settlement in the West Bank. Located between Ariel and Rosh HaAyin, it falls under the jurisdiction of Shomron Regional Council. In 2021 it had a population of 2,519.

The international community considers Israeli settlements in the West Bank illegal under international law, but the Israeli government disputes this.

== Etymology ==
The settlement was named for the Tribe of Ephraim, whose territory was in the area.

== See also ==
- Mas-ha
