= Sal'it =

Israeli settlement in the West Bank

Sal'it: סלעית (Hebrew)
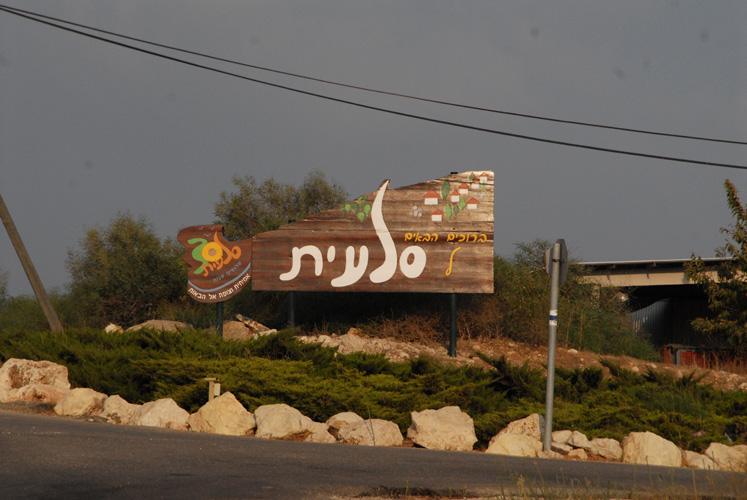

- Location within the Northern West Bank
- Coordinates: 32.2426°N 35.0519°E
- Country: Palestine
- District: Judea and Samaria Area
- Council: Shomron
- Region: West Bank
- Affiliation: Mishkei Herut Beitar
- Founded: 1979
- Founder: Mishkei Herut Beitar
- Population (2024): 1,471
- Website: Salit

Sal'it (Hebrew: סַלְעִית, lit. 'Wheatear') is an Israeli settlement organized as a moshav in the West Bank. Located in the Seam Zone around eight kilometres south of the Palestinian city of Tulkarm, it falls under the jurisdiction of Shomron Regional Council. In 2024 it had a population of 1,471.

The international community considers Israeli settlements in the West Bank illegal under international law, but the Israeli government disputes this.

== History ==
The village was established in 1979 by the Mishkei Herut Beitar movement.
