= Kiryat Netafim =

Israeli settlement in the West Bank

Kiryat Netafim: קִרְיַת נְטָפִים (Hebrew)
- Israeli settlement
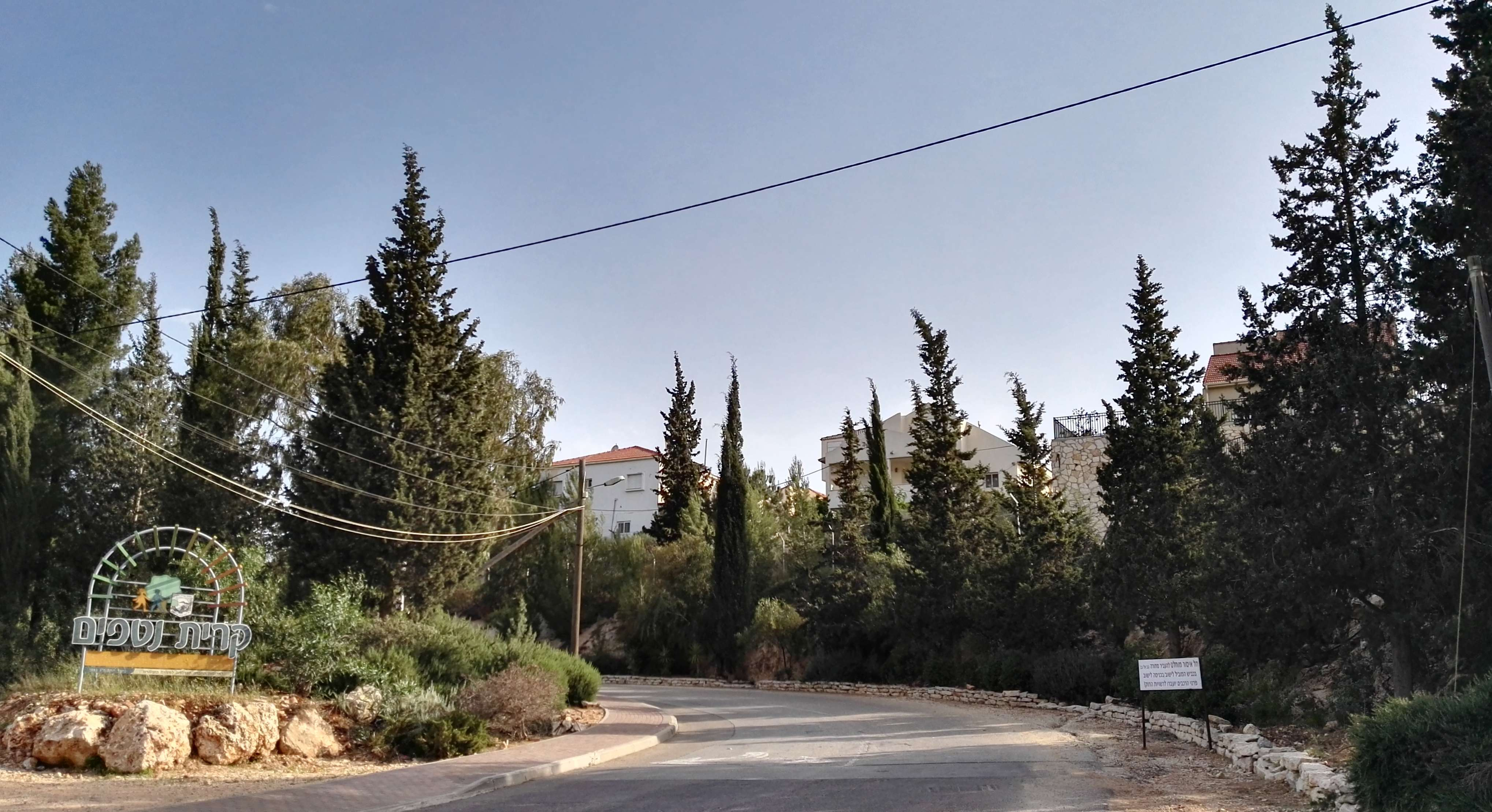

- Location within the Northern West Bank
- Coordinates: 32°6′58″N 35°6′49″E
- Country: Palestine
- District: Judea and Samaria Area
- Council: Shomron
- Region: West Bank
- Affiliation: Hapoel HaMizrachi
- Founded: 1986
- Founder: Nahal
- Population (2024): 923

Kiryat Netafim (Hebrew: קִרְיַת נְטָפִים, Arabic: كريات نتافيم) is an Israeli settlement located in the northern West Bank, about 8 km west of the city Ariel. Organised as a community settlement, it falls under the jurisdiction of the Shomron Regional Council. As of 2024, it had a population of 923.

The international community considers Israeli settlements in the West Bank illegal under international law, but the Israeli government disputes this.

== History ==
Kiryat Netafim was founded in June 1986 by a group of Orthodox Yemenite Jews. According to the ARIJ, it was established on land belonging to the Palestinian villages of Qarawat Bani Hassan, and Haris. The settlement is part of a chain of settlements built along the Trans-Samaria Highway and adjacent to the Barkan Industrial Park. It is named after a Bible verse: "New wine will drip from the mountains." (Amos 9:13). Since its founding, Kiryat Netafim has diversified, welcoming families from various different backgrounds.

In 2009, the organisation Peace Now petitioned the Israeli High Court, and laid a complaint against the then Defence Minister Ehud Barak, to order the demolition of 14 illegal structures built without authorization on public and private Palestinian land. The Defence ministry replied given approval to construction plans that would legalize the 14 structures. An interim injunction from the High Court on October 1 prohibited construction until the legal issues were settled. A further request was made on December 29 to find the settlers guilty of contempt for breaching the injunction to stop building. The state admitted the fact but requested the breach be ignored because the state had limited resources to regulate settlements and different priorities.

In November 2014, Netafim began bulldozing and clearing additional Qarawat Bani Hassan territory, under the protection of IDF troops, in what appeared to be an effort to extend the settlement.

The community is located near of several archaeological sites.

== Education ==
The settlement has two kindergartens and one nursery.
