= Hermesh =

Israeli settlement in the West Bank

Hermesh: חֶרְמֵשׁ (Hebrew)
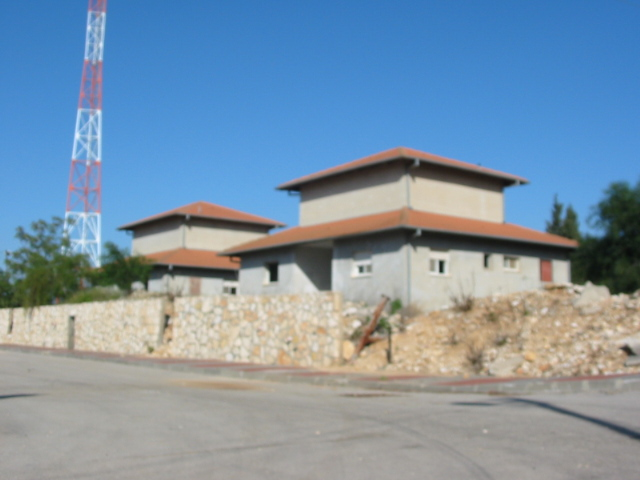
- Etymology: Scythe
- Location within the Northern West Bank Location within the West Bank Location within Israel
- Coordinates: 32°25′24″N 35°7′9″E
- Country: Palestine
- District: Judea and Samaria Area
- Council: Shomron
- Region: West Bank
- Affiliation: Mishkei Herut Beitar
- Founded: 1984
- Founder: Mishkei Herut Beitar
- Population (2024): 295

Hermesh (Hebrew: חֶרְמֵשׁ, lit. 'Scythe') is an Israeli settlement in the western Samarian hills of the West Bank. Founded in 1984, it is organised as a community settlement and falls under the jurisdiction of Shomron Regional Council. In 2024 it had a population of 295.

The international community considers Israeli settlements in the West Bank to be illegal, but the Israeli government disputes this.

== History ==
Hermesh was established in 1984 by the Mishkei Herut Beitar settlement organization. Most of the residents of Hermesh are secular Jews or non-Jews. More than half of the population are new immigrants, mainly from the former Soviet Union. Their motivation for living in the region is not ideology but quality of life.

On 29 October 2002 three residents of Hermesh, Orna Eshel (53), Hadas Turgeman (14), and Linoy Saroussi (14) were shot dead by a Palestinian gunman who entered the village armed with a Kalashnikov. A soldier and a resident were wounded in the attack. Al-Aqsa Martyrs' Brigades claimed responsibility.

On 20 June 2005 Hermesh resident Yevgeny Reider (28) was killed in a shooting attack near Baqa ash-Sharqiyya, in the northern West Bank. Islamic Jihad claimed responsibility for the attack. On 30 May 2023 settler Meir Tamari (32) was killed in a shooting attack near the entrance of the settlement. Al-Aqsa Martyrs’ Brigades claimed responsibility for the attack.

== Archaeology ==
Frasin, Palestinian village located across the road is identified with Kfar Parshai mentioned in the Talmud (Babylonian Talmud, Abodah Zarah, 31a).
