= Had Ness =

Israeli settlement in the Golan Heights

Had Ness: חַד נֵס (Hebrew)
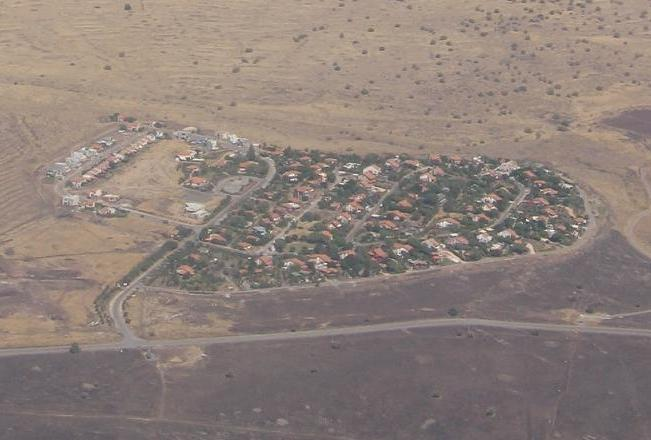
- Etymology: One Flag
- Location within the Golan Heights Location within the Golan Heights
- Coordinates: 32°55′39″N 35°38′32″E
- Country: Golan Heights (Internationally recognized as Syrian territory occupied by Israel.)
- District: Northern
- Subdistrict: Golan
- Council: Golan
- Region: Golan Heights
- Affiliation: Mishkei Herut Beitar
- Founded: 1989
- Founder: Mishkei Herut Beitar
- Population (2024): 885
- Website: http://www.hadnes4u.co.il/

Had Ness (Hebrew: חַד נֵס) is an Israeli settlement organized as a community settlement in the Golan Heights. Located adjacent to the Jordan River, it falls under the jurisdiction of the Israeli Golan Regional Council. In 2024 it had a population of 885.

The international community considers Israeli settlements such as Had Ness in the Golan Heights a sillegal under international law, but the Israeli government disputes this.

== History ==
Had Ness was established by the revisionist Zionist Herut Beitar settlement movement. It was conceptualised by a predominantly American group of Betar members. Home ownership was approved in March 1982, after the Golan Heights Law was passed in 1981. Despite approval, there was no formal initial settlement group sent out to establish it and families only began to move there in 1987. It was named after 3 settlements, Holit, Dekla and Neot Sinai, evacuated from the Sinai Peninsula as a result of the Israel-Egypt Peace Treaty in 1979. In 1998, the Israeli Ministerial Committee on the Development of the Galilee approved plans for the construction of 2,300 new residential homes and 2,500 holiday homes in Had Ness. A number of the holiday homes overlook the Sea of Galilee.

== Transportation ==
The Golan Regional Council operates seven buses per day from Had Ness to the Israeli city of Tiberias. The bus line begins at Katzrin. The bus ride to Tiberias takes approximately 22 minutes. Had Ness is located along Highway 888, four kilometres from Highway 87, a major road running through the Golan Heights.

== See also ==
- Israeli-occupied territories
