= Platoon of the Wall =

Jewish paramilitary unit in Mandatory Palestine

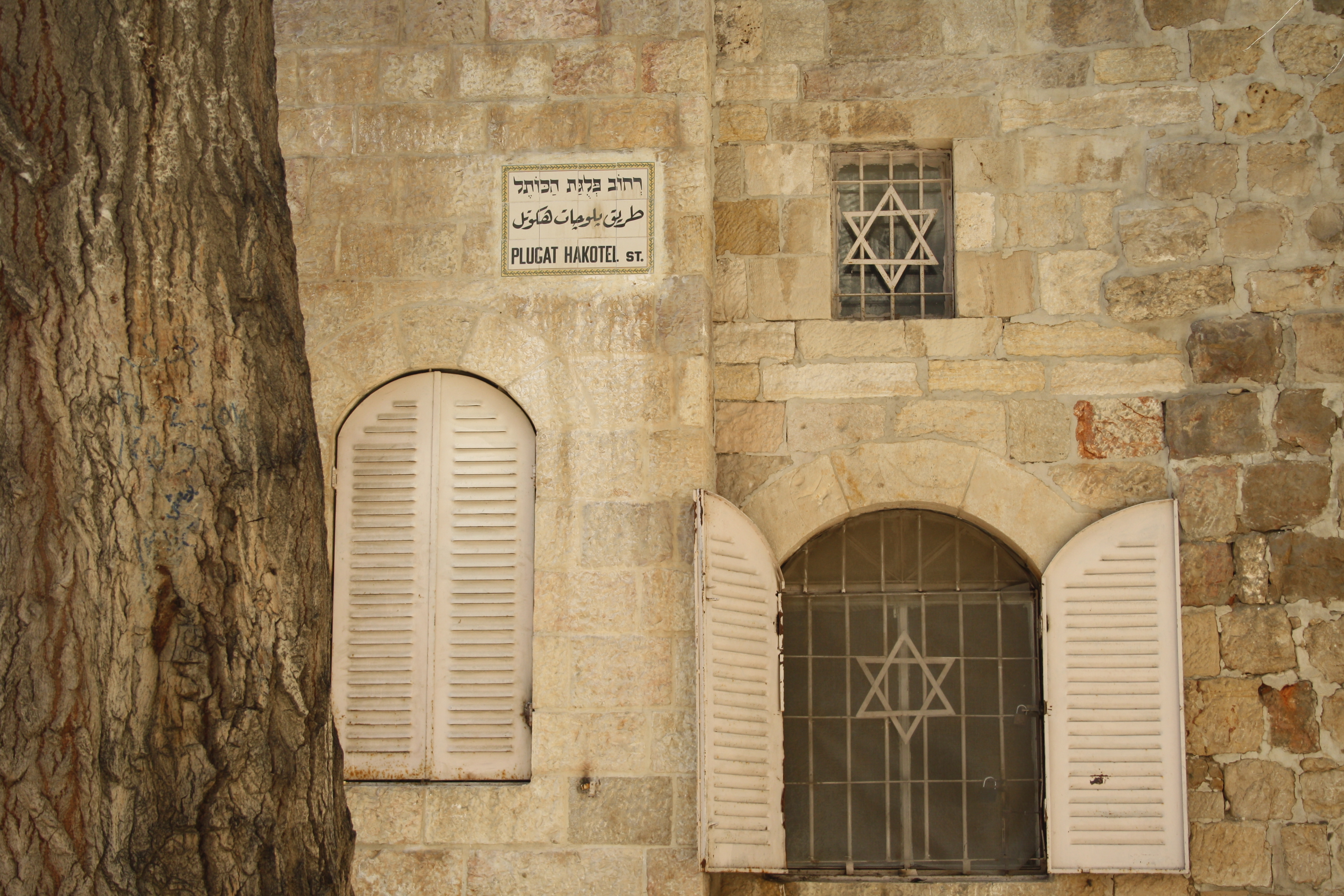
Plugat HaKotel street in the Old City of Jerusalem near the corner where the Plugat HaKotel museum is located

The Platoon of the Wall (Plugat Hakotel, Hebrew: פלוגת הכותל) was a group made up of Betar members in Mandatory Palestine that defended the rights of Jews at the Western Wall in the years 1937-1938, and guarded the Old City using concealed stores of arms and clubs and accompanied Jewish worshipers to and from the Western Wall. Members were also responsible for the blowing of the shofar at the Western Wall, which was deemed illegal by the British authorities.

On the evening of October 29, 1937, as a result of Arabs shooting at such a group, one Jew was killed and three wounded.

== Legacy ==
=== Street ===
A street in the Old City of Jerusalem is named in its honor, "Plugat HaKotel Street".

=== Museum ===
On May 15, 2018 the Beit Plugat HaKotel (lit. 'Platoon of the [Western] Wall House') museum was inaugurated at a special ceremony in the Old City of Jerusalem. The building was used as the Plugat HaKotel headquarters. It was later used to house IDF soldiers for special programming and for tour groups, specifically from the Betar youth group to which the original Plugat HaKotel members belonged. 97-year-old Yaakov (Sika) Aharoni, the last original member was in attendance and met with present-day Betar youth.
