= Shomron Regional Council =

Israeli regional council in the West Bank

Coordinates: 32°14′N 35°20′E

Shomron Regional Council מוֹעֵצָה אֲזוֹרִית שֹׁמְרוֹן
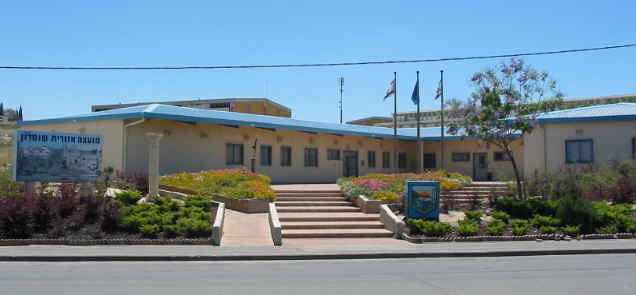

- Interactive map of Shomron Regional Council
- Country: Israel
- District: Judea and Samaria Area
- Region: West Bank
- Area: 2,800,000 dunams (2,800 km^{2}; 1,100 sq mi)
- Population (2024): 48,036
  - Density: 17/km^{2} (44/sq mi)
- Website: www.shomron.org.il

The Shomron Regional Council (Hebrew: מוֹעֵצָה אֲזוֹרִית שֹׁמְרוֹן, Mo'atza Azorit Shomron, English Samaria Regional Council) is an Israeli regional council in the northern portion of the Israeli-occupied West Bank. Thirty-five Israeli settlements fall under its jurisdiction. As of 2024 the jurisdiction area of the council has a population of about 48,036 people. The main offices are located in the Barkan Industrial Park. Israeli settlements in the West Bank have been declared illegal under international law, (Note: The consensus view of the international community is that Israeli settlements are illegal and are in violation of Article 49 of the Fourth Geneva Convention, and in breach of international declarations. The United Nations Security Council, the United Nations General Assembly, the International Committee of the Red Cross, the International Court of Justice, and the High Contracting Parties to the Convention have all affirmed that the Fourth Geneva Convention applies to the Israeli-occupied territories. Numerous UN resolutions have held Israeli settlements to be a violation of international law, including UN Security Council resolutions 446 in 1979, 478 in 1980, and 2334 in 2016. This was again reaffirmed in a 2024 advisory opinion issued by the International Court of Justice.) but the Israeli government disputes this. (Note: Israel maintains that settlements are legal and consistent with international law, citing historical, legal, and security reasons. This position has been upheld by successive Israeli governments.)

Covering 2,800 square kilometers of the West Bank, it was, prior to the fall of 2005 when some of its municipal land was abandoned as part of Israel's unilateral disengagement plan, the largest Israeli regional council in municipal area.

In August 2015, Yossi Dagan was elected to position of Chairman of Shomron Regional Council, with 62% of the vote.

== Geography ==
The municipal area of the Council spreads across 2,800 square kilometers, which corresponds to about 10 percent of the area of the State of Israel within the Green Line. In municipal area, Shomron Regional Council is among the largest Israeli authorities.

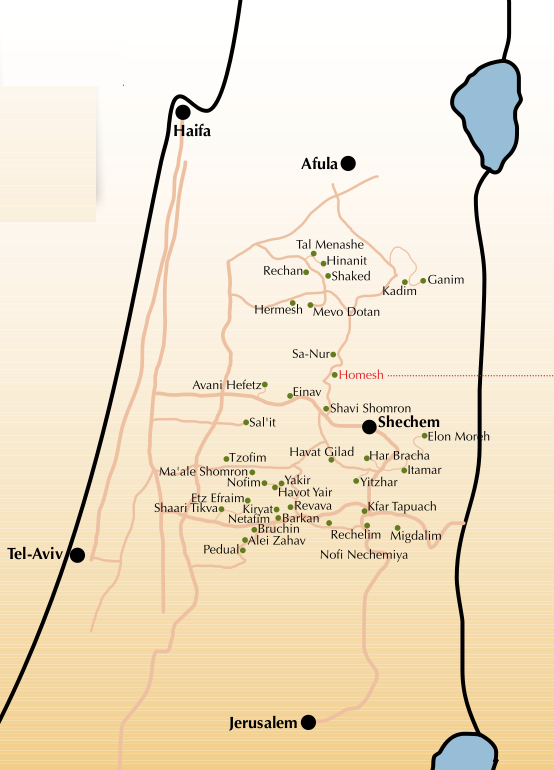
Map of communities of Shomron regional council. "Shechem" is Hebrew for Nablus

The municipal boundaries:

- North: the settlements of Ganim and Kadim, reaching to Megiddo Junction.
- West: the settlement of Tzofim, reaching to Kfar Saba.
- South: the settlements of Peduel and Alei Zahav.

The council is divided into geographic regions, where each region has its own characteristics:

- The Northern Shomron region: Hinanit, Hermesh, Tal Menashe, Mevo Dotan, Reihan, Shaked. All the communities are secular, except for Tal Menashe. Population is around 2,000.
- Central-Western Shomron: Avnei Hefetz, Barkan, Ma'ale Shomron, Nofim, Sal'it, Einav, Etz Efraim, Peduel, Tzufim, Kiryat Netafim, Revava, Shavei Shomron, Sha'arei Tikva, Yakir: mixed population (secular and religious). Most of the communities are large and well established. If you add to them the Local Authorities in Samaria (Alfei Menashe, Elkana, Immanuel, Karnei Shomron, Kedumim, Oranit; and the city of Ariel), all of which are located in this region, the Jewish population numbers about 60,000.
- Mountain Communities: Elon Moreh, Itamar, Har Brakha, Yitzhar (one block, near Nablus, population about 3,000), and farther south, Kfar Tapuach, Rehelim, and Migdalim, with less than 1000 residents.

== Demographics ==
Historical population
Year	Pop.	±%
1983	1,900	—
1995	8,300	+336.8%
2008	17,700	+113.3%
2022	43,126	+143.6%
2024	48,036	+11.4%

== Tourism ==
The local government and residents of Shomron opened the region to local and international tourism. Boutique wineries, organic farms, historical and biblical sites have developed into tourism attractions. The Jewish Shepherd at Kfar Tapuach, the Barkan Industrial park and hiking tails in the scenic natural reserve at attracting tourists from around the world. Israel's Minister of Tourism Yariv Levin was quoted saying: "I strongly believe in the tourism potential of Samaria. I can tell you from personal experience that I visited Samaria many times, and it might very well be the most beautiful region in Israel".

=== Sister City ===
On September 12, 2016, the Town of Hempstead in New York signed a Declaration of Cooperation with the Shomron Regional Council in the Israeli-occupied West Bank, as part of an effort to counter the BDS movement. Council Chairman Yossi Dagan, Town Supervisor Anthony Santino, Councilmen Bruce Blakeman, Anthony D'Esposito, and Edward Ambrosino signed the document.

== Towns of Shomron ==
The largest settlement in the Shomron Regional Council today is Sha'arei Tikva, numbering over 5,500 residents.

=== List of settlements ===
- Alei Zahav
- Avnei Hefetz
- Beit El
- Barkan
- Brukhin
- Einav
- Elon Moreh
- Etz Efraim
- Evyatar
- Givat Arnon
- Har Bracha
- Hermesh
- Hinanit
- Itamar
- Kfar Tapuach
- Kiryat Netafim
- Ma'ale Shomron
- Mevo Dotan
- Migdalim
- Nofim
- Peduel
- Rehelim
- Reihan
- Revava
- Sal'it
- Sha'arei Tikva
- Shaked
- Shavei Shomron
- Tel Menashe
- Tzofim
- Yakir
- Yitzhar

=== Previously razed settlements ===
During the implementation of Israel's unilateral disengagement plan of August/September 2005, the residents of four of the Shomron Regional Council's settlements were evicted, their residential buildings destroyed, and land abandoned to the Palestinians, including territory outlined in the Oslo Accords as Area 'C' in full Israeli control.

In 2025 and 2026, the four settlements were re-established.

- Ganim
- Homesh
- Kadim
- Sa-Nur

== Voting Patterns ==
In the 2022 election, 86 percent of voters in the regional council voted for the parties of the right-wing coalition led by Benjamin Netanyahu, while 14 percent voted for the parties of the center-left coalition led by Yair Lapid and 0.03 percent voted for the Arab parties.

In the 2026 election, 77 percent of voters in the regional council voted for the parties of the right-wing coalition led by Benjamin Netanyahu, while 14 percent voted for the parties of the center-left coalition led by Gadi Eisenkot and 0.06 percent voted for the Arab parties. An additional 2.6 percent voted for the Reservists, and 5.3 percent voted for Amcha Yisrael. Voter turnout increased 23 percent from the 2022 election.
