= Hinanit =

Israeli settlement in the West Bank

Hinanit: חיננית (Hebrew)
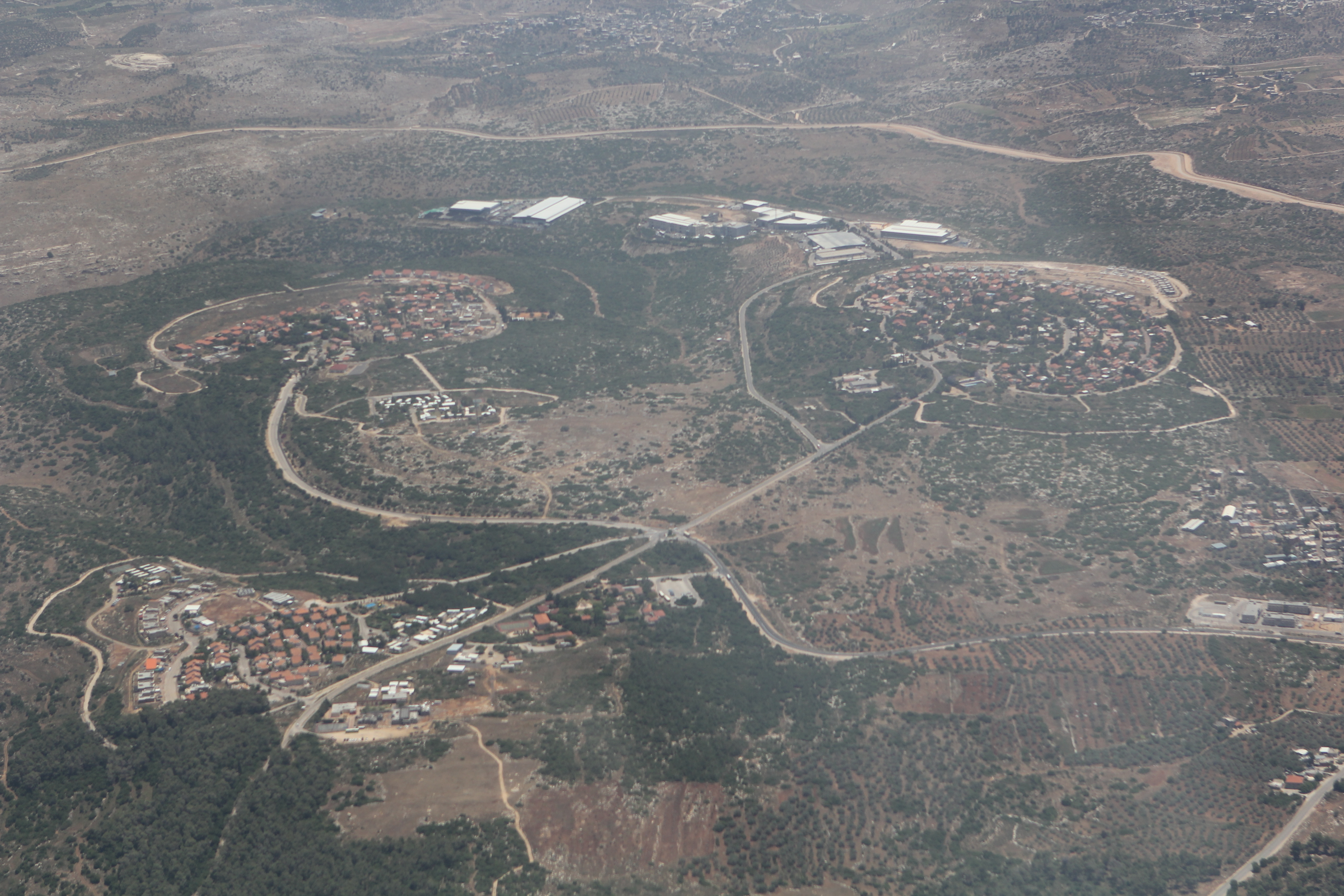
- Etymology: Daisy
- Location within the Northern West Bank Location within the West Bank Location within State of Palestine
- Coordinates: 32°28′49″N 35°10′20″E
- Country: Palestine
- District: Judea and Samaria Area
- Council: Shomron
- Region: West Bank
- Affiliation: HaMerkaz HaHakla'i
- Founded: 1981
- Founder: Mountain Jews
- Population (2024): 1,793

Hinanit (Hebrew: חִנָּנִית, lit. 'Daisy') is an Israeli settlement in the northern West Bank. It is organised as a community settlement and falls under the jurisdiction of Shomron Regional Council. Hinanit is located just across the Green Line border with Israel in the northern West Bank's Jenin Governorate, and to the north abuts the Palestinian village of 'Anin, from which it is separated by Israel's West Bank barrier. It lies approximately 9 miles (15 km) west of Jenin city. In 2024 it had a population of 1,793.

The international community considers Israeli settlements in the West Bank illegal under international law, but the Israeli government disputes this.

== History ==
The village was established in 1981 by Mountain Jews from the Caucasus. Originally a moshav and a member of the Moshavim Movement, it was later converted to a community settlement.
