= Nofim =

Israeli settlement in the West Bank

Nofim: נוֹפִים (Hebrew)
- Etymology: Views
- Location within the Northern West Bank
- Coordinates: 32°09′13″N 35°06′06″E
- Country: Palestine
- District: Judea and Samaria Area
- Council: Shomron
- Region: West Bank
- Founded: 1986
- Population (2024): 1,462

Nofim (Hebrew: נוֹפִים, lit. Views) is an Israeli settlement on the western edge of the northern West Bank. Located adjacent to Yakir and about 30 km east of Tel Aviv, it falls under the jurisdiction of Shomron Regional Council. In 2024 it had a population of 1,462.

The international community considers Israeli settlements in the West Bank illegal under international law, but the Israeli government disputes this.

== History ==
According to ARIJ, Israel confiscated 625 dunams of land from the nearby Palestinian village of Deir Istiya in order to construct Nofim.

The settlement was founded in 1986 on state lands by a group of secular Jewish Israelis. The Kana Stream passes to the north, west and south.
