= Shaked =

Israeli settlement in the West Bank

Shaked: שָׁקֵד (Hebrew)
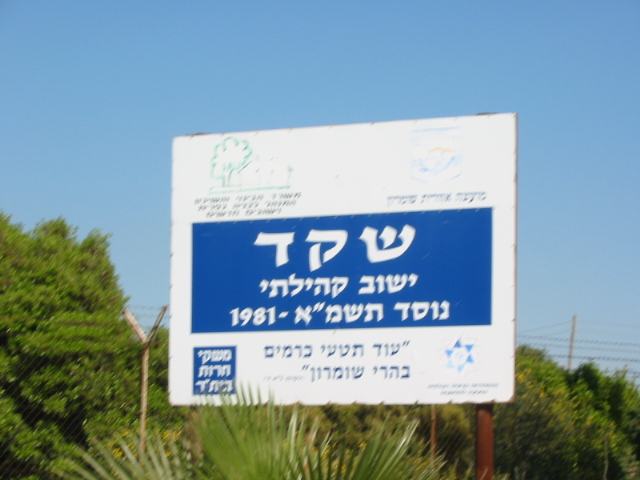
- Welcome sign at entrance to the village

- Location within the Northern West Bank
- Coordinates: 32°28′24″N 35°10′8″E
- Country: Palestine
- District: Judea and Samaria Area
- Council: Shomron
- Region: West Bank
- Affiliation: Mishkei Herut Beitar
- Founded: 1981
- Founder: Mishkei Herut Beitar
- Population (2024): 1,146
- Website: shaked81.co.il

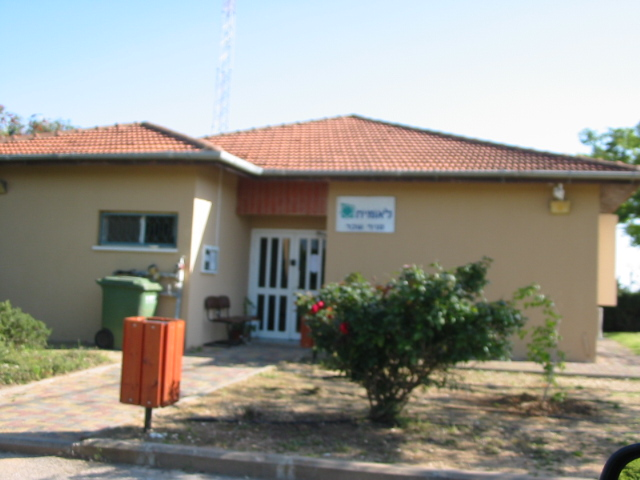
Leumit Health Fund clinic in Shaked

Shaked (Hebrew: שָׁקֵד, lit. Almond) is a secular Israeli settlement in the northern West Bank. Located near the Green Line, it is organized as a community settlement and falls under the jurisdiction of Shomron Regional Council. In 2024 it had a population of 1,146.

The international community considers Israeli settlements in the West Bank illegal under international law, but the Israeli government disputes this.

== History ==
The settlement was established in June 1981 by the Mishkei Herut Beitar organization, after the first ten homes were complete. It was named for the wild almond trees that grow in the area.

In 2006, Israeli Defense Minister Shaul Mofaz cited Shaked as one of the settlements that would be included in Israel's final borders under a peace plan with the Palestinians.

In 2011, a resident of Shaked, 15-year-old Shahar Sagi, won a silver medal in the Loralux international judo competition in Luxembourg.
