= Barkan =

Israeli settlement in the West Bank

Barkan: בַּרְקָן (Hebrew)
- Israeli settlement
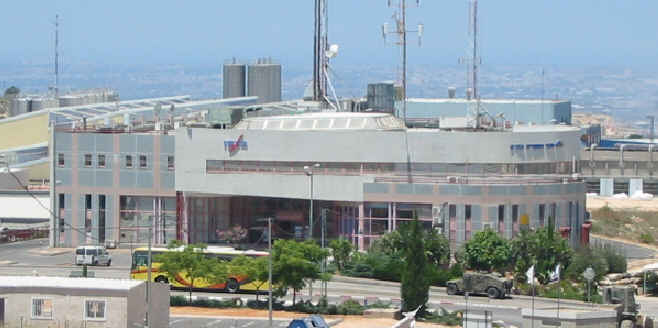
- The Barkan mall

- Location within the Northern West Bank
- Coordinates: 32°6′27″N 35°6′20.51″E
- Country: Palestine
- District: Judea and Samaria Area
- Council: Shomron
- Region: West Bank
- Affiliation: Mishkei Herut Beitar
- Founded: 1981
- Founder: Beitar and Herut
- Population (2024): 2,171

Barkan (Hebrew: בַּרְקָן) is an Israeli settlement in the northern West Bank, about 8 km west of the Palestinian city of Salfit, under the administrative local government of the Shomron Regional Council. In 2024 its population was 2,171.

The international community considers Israeli settlements in the West Bank illegal under international law, but the Israeli government disputes this.

== History ==
Founded in June 1981 by secular Israelis from the Beitar and Herut movements, Barkan is part of a chain of settlements built along the Trans-Samaria Highway, and adjacent to the Barkan Industrial Park. The park, established in 1982, has 120 businesses and factories manufacturing plastics, metal-work, food, textile, and more. Of the 5,000 workers, 90% are Palestinian Arabs.

According to ARIJ, Israel confiscated land from two Palestinian villages in order to construct Barkan: 167 dunams from Qarawat Bani Hassan, and 353 dunams from Sarta.

"Barkan" is called after the Hebrew name of the Syrian thistle. The original name of the town was Beit Abba after Abba Ahimeir, a leader of the Lehi.

== Archaeology ==
An archaeological site east of the town contains remnants of an Israelite settlement during the time of the first and second temples.

== See also ==
- Barkan Industrial Park
