= Amana (organization) =

Israeli settlement movement

- Formation: 1976
- Purpose: "Developing communities in Judea, Samaria, the Golan Heights, the Galilee, the Negev and Gush Katif"

Amana (Hebrew: אמנה, 'Covenant') is an Israeli settlement movement formed by Gush Emunim in 1976. Its primary goal was "developing communities in Judea, Samaria, the Golan Heights, the Galilee, the Negev and Gush Katif." The initial communities it developed were Ofra, Mevo Modi'in, Kedumim, and Ma'aleh Adumim. Settlements developed in the West Bank, including East Jerusalem, are illegal under international law.

It became a registered association in 1978. It was also recognized by the World Zionist Organization. Over time, it became nearly independent of Gush Emunim.

An investigation by the Israeli police into 15 land deals conducted by the Amana subsidiary Al Watan concluded early in 2016 that 14 of the transactions were fraudulent. One method used involved giving a suitcase full of cash to a fake Palestinian owner and taking it back afterwards. Al Watan denied the charges. Amana has provided financial support to illegal Israeli outposts in the West Bank.

On 27 June 2024, Canada imposed sanctions on the Amana movement "for their role in facilitating, supporting or financially contributing to acts of violence ... against Palestinian civilians and their property". Nearly 90 US lawmakers sent a letter to Joe Biden in late October 2024, asking him to sanction Amana, which is involved in settlement development. On November 18, 2024, the US government imposed sanctions on Amana. The executive order authorizing these sanctions was rescinded by incoming US President Donald Trump in January 2025.

== Budget and funding ==
As of 2024 Amana controlled assets worth approximately NIS 600 million ($160.4 million) and had a budget of tens of millions of shekels per year, according to Peace Now.
