= Battle of Arara =

Battle

Coordinates: 32°29′38.67″N 35°3′16.13″E

- Part of the Middle Eastern theatre of World War I
Date	19 September 1918
Location	Wadi Ara (near Nablus), Palestine
Result	Franco–British victory

Belligerents
German Empire; Ottoman Empire	France: French Armenian Legion; British Empire

Commanders and leaders
(German Empire) Otto Liman von Sanders (Ottoman Empire) Jevad Pasha (German Empire) Oberst Gustav von Oppen	(United Kingdom of Great Britain and Ireland) Edmund Allenby (French Third Republic) Colonel Jean Philpin de Piépape (French Third Republic) Lieutenant Colonel Louis Romieu (British Empire) Major General S. W. Hare

Strength
16th and 19th Divisions, Asia Corps, Eighth Army, Yıldırım Army Group	54th (East Anglian) Division; Détachement Français de Palestine et de Syrie (DFPS) including the French Armenian Legion, XXI Corps Egyptian Expeditionary Force

Casualties and losses
218 Ottoman soldiers including six officers taken prisoner by the DFPS among 700 prisoners	535 including 23 French Armenian Legion dead 76 wounded

The Battle of Arara took place on 19 September 1918 during the Battle of Sharon, which, together with the Battle of Nablus, comprised the Battle of Megiddo, fought between 19 and 25 September, in the last months of the Sinai and Palestine Campaign of the First World War. During the infantry phase of the Battle of Sharon the British Empire 60th Division, XXI Corps attacked and captured the section of the front line nearest the Mediterranean coast under cover of an intense artillery barrage including a creeping barrage and naval gunfire while the 3rd (Lahore), 7th (Meerut) and 75th Divisions XXI Corps attacked the Tabsor group of trenches. These Egyptian Expeditionary Force (EEF) victories over the entrenched Ottoman Eighth Army, composed of German and Ottoman soldiers, began the Final Offensive, ultimately resulting in the destruction of the equivalent of one Ottoman army, the retreat of what remained of two others, and the capture of many thousands of prisoners and many miles of territory from the Judean Hills to the border of modern-day Turkey. After the end of the battle of Megiddo, the Desert Mounted Corps pursued the retreating soldiers to Damascus, six days later. By the time an Armistice of Mudros was signed between the Allies and the Ottoman Empire five weeks later, Aleppo had been captured.

During the Battle of Arara the Yildirim Army Group of the German and Ottoman Empires was attacked by the 54th (East Anglian) Division and the French Detachment of Palestine and Syria which included the French Armenian Legion (XXI Corps). This battle on the extreme right of the main attack covered the flank of the attackers pivoting on their positions. The Armenian's' role during this battle was so prominent that their efforts were recognized by the top commanders of the Allied Force.

== Background ==
In September 1918, on the Palestinian front, the Ottoman army was crumbling before the British expeditionary forces in the Middle East, which contained an Armenian contingent commanded by a French colonel and French officers, as well as Armenian officers. Many of the Armenians were survivors from Musa Dagh, where Armenians had resisted against Turkish massacres during the Armenian genocide. The legion had landed at Jaffa in the middle of September and was prepared to take part in the final British offensive to evict the Ottomans from Palestine.

== Prelude ==
=== Deployment of 54th Division and DFPS ===
The 54th (East Anglian) Division, consisted of the 161st, 162nd and 163rd Brigades of the British Army. Alongside them were most of the French Detachment of Palestine and Syria (DFPS) commanded by Colonel Gilles de Philpin de Piépape. Whilst its mounted troops served elsewhere in the 5th Light Horse Brigade, the rest of the organisation served alongside the 54th.

Under cover of a British barrage, the 54th (East Anglian) Division on a frontage between Mejdel Yaba and Rafat, with the DFPS on the right, the 163rd Brigade in the centre and the 161st Brigade on the right pivoting on the Rafat salient, were to advance through Crown Hill north east of Kufr Qasim. While the 162nd Brigade on the left would move eastwards on Bidya and capture the crossings of the Wadi Qana south of Kh. Kefir Thilth towards Kefr Kasim before advancing north east.

=== Deployment of Asia Corps ===
The 16th Division, one of the four front–line Ottoman divisions of the Eighth Army, consisted of the 47th and the 48th Infantry Regiments with the 1st Battalion, 125th Infantry and part of the 48th Regiment's machine–gun company, with the divisional assault, engineer, and cavalry companies in reserve. This division held the front line during the night of 18/19 September, expecting an attack from part of the 54th (East Anglian) Division and the DFPS.

== Battle ==
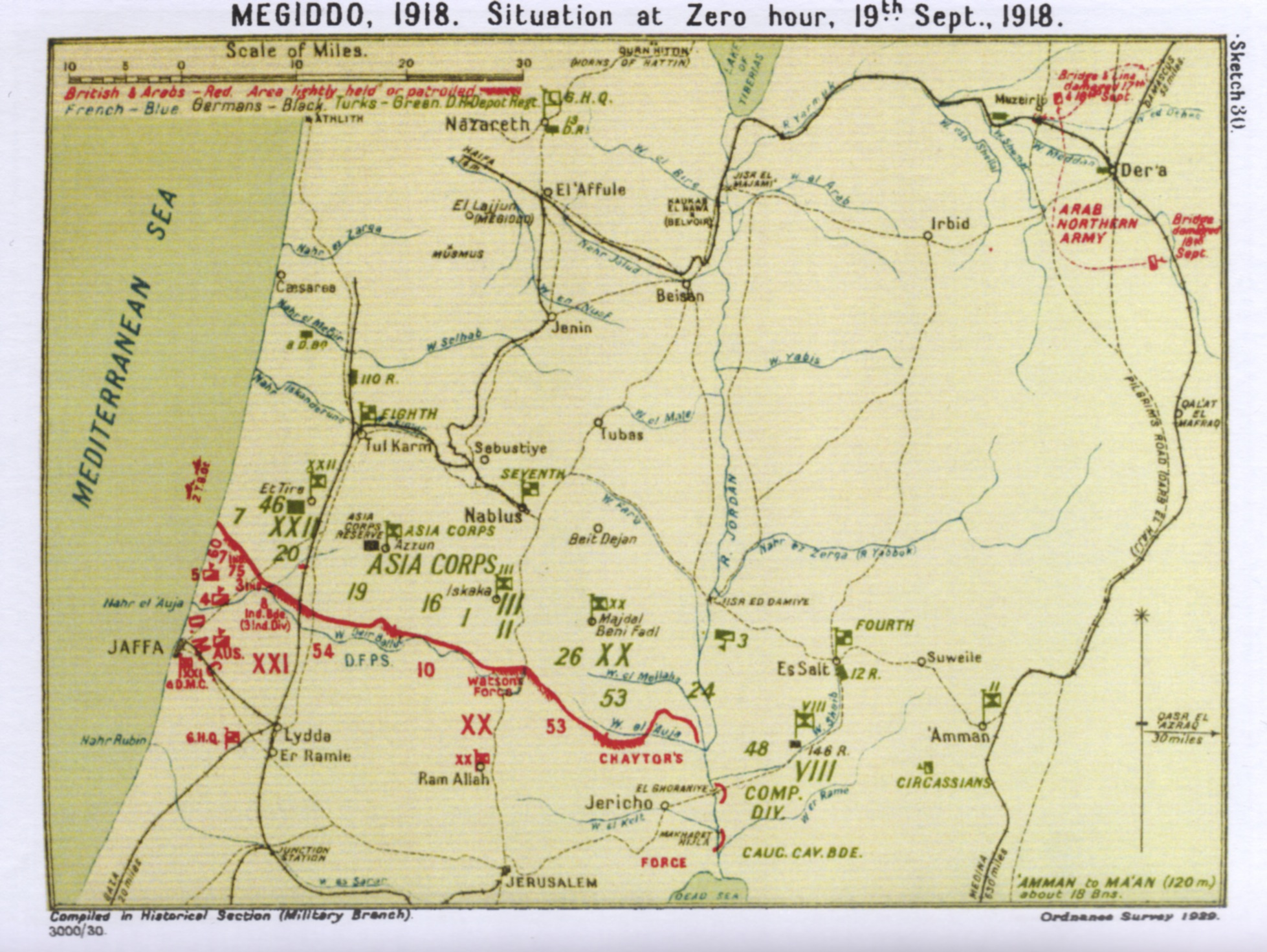
Falls Sketch Map 30 Megiddo Zero Hour 19 September 1918

The 19th Division (von Oppen Group) was attacked by the British 54th (East Anglian) Division which pushed forward as the pivot for the infantry advance across the coastal plain of Sharon. The 19th Division (Asia Corps) was shelled heavily and subjected to infantry assaults which resulted in both of von Oppen's divisions; the 19th and 16th Divisions retreating intact.

German General Otto Liman von Sanders commander of the Yildirim Army Group at Nazareth, despatched a battalion of the 125th Regiment to the north of 'Azzun Ibn 'Atme shortly after heaving about the breakthrough. In the afternoon, German Colonel Gustav von Oppen commander of the Asia Corps despatched a German lieutenant with clerks, orderlies and transport men with some machine guns to Kh. Kefar Thilth to rally the retreating 19th Division which had been near Jaljulye.

The 162nd Brigade, 54th (East Anglian) Division, less the 11th Battalion London Regiment escorting divisional artillery, covered the gap between the division's left and the right of the 3rd (Lahore) Division at Ras el Ain, where they were heavily shelled south west of Kufr Qasim by long range guns. On hearing of the capture of Kufr Qasim at 09:30 they began an advance between Sivri Wood and Crown Hill but was directed to support the 161st Brigade attack at Sivri Wood which was captured. Subsequently, three battalions advanced steadily eastwards to the Wadi Qana where three howitzers were captured. Later in the day, Azzun Ibn Atme was captured and during the early morning Kh es Sumra was reached.

The French fought well, and had some 150 killed and wounded – Armenians and Tirailleurs Algériens.

— Allenby; letter to his wife, 24 September 1918.

The advance of the 161st Brigade on Kufr Qasim was checked but eventually they managed to captured it by 07:00 along with Jevis Tepe to the west. The 6th and 7th Battalions, Essex Regiment then moved up to attack the next line of trenches with their right near Crown Hill, where they encountered obstinate resistance but after another bombardment the whole position was occupied.

The 163rd Brigade advanced towards the front line trenches and at 04:20 just as the 4th and 5th Battalions, Norfolk Regiment reached these, the British barrage lifted and began to move forward. Their first objective was taken so quickly they had to wait for the barrage's next lift then the 5th Battalion, Suffolk Regiment captured a position north of the Wadi el 'Ayun. A very strong Ottoman counter-attack north of this wadi became critical until units in the Détachement Français de Palestine et de Syrie (DFPS) appeared on Scurry Hill and opened fire on the Ottoman attackers who were forced to surrender. By 14:00 it was found that Ottoman defences to the north had been captured and a move towards Mesha, Bidya and Kh. Sirisia began. This fighting continued on into the night. By 03:00 20 September, Mesha had been occupied and Bidya entered.

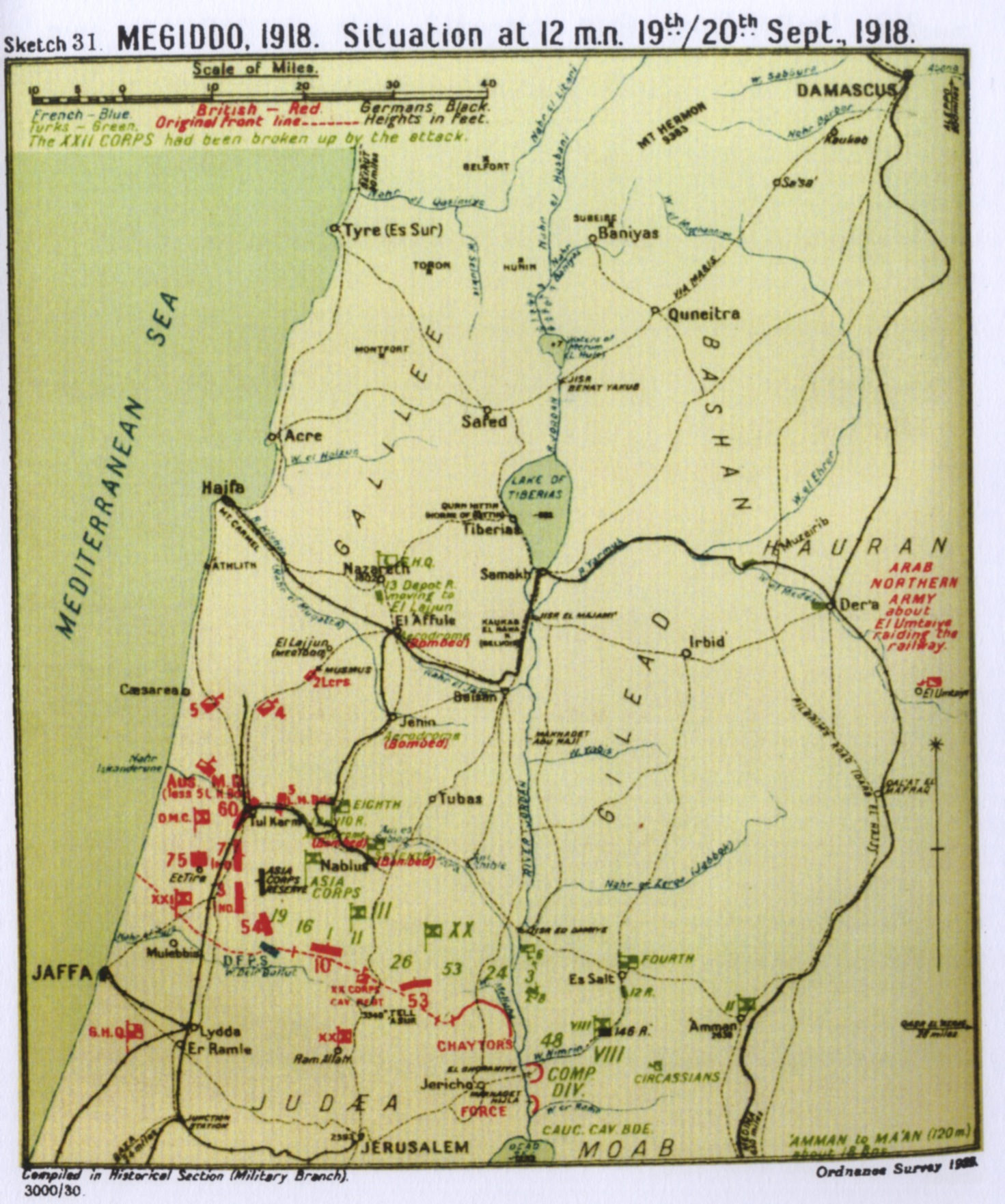
Falls Map 31 Megiddo Situation at 24:00 19/20 September 1918

On the right of the 54th (East Anglian) Division's 163rd Brigade, the DFPS fought against the German Pasha 11 Group which held a ridge opposite the Rafat salient captured and held by the British since April 1918. Here, the DFPS attacked the col west of Rafat and the sites known as Three Bushes and Scurry Hills; these last two being quickly captured at 05:10 and 05:45 respectively. Although Kh. Deir el Qassis east of Scurry Hill was occupied soon after it had to be abandoned due to heavy artillery beyond the reach of the French artillery. During the night of 19 September, the DFPS occupied Arara north east of Rafat having captured almost all their objectives and 212 prisoners.

The DFPS and the 54th (East Anglian) Division eventually captured their objectives and established a secure pivot on the ridge for the XXI Corps' line of attack which stretched across five divisions to the Mediterranean Sea. In the process they captured about 700 prisoners, nine guns and 20 machine guns suffering 535 casualties.

== Aftermath ==
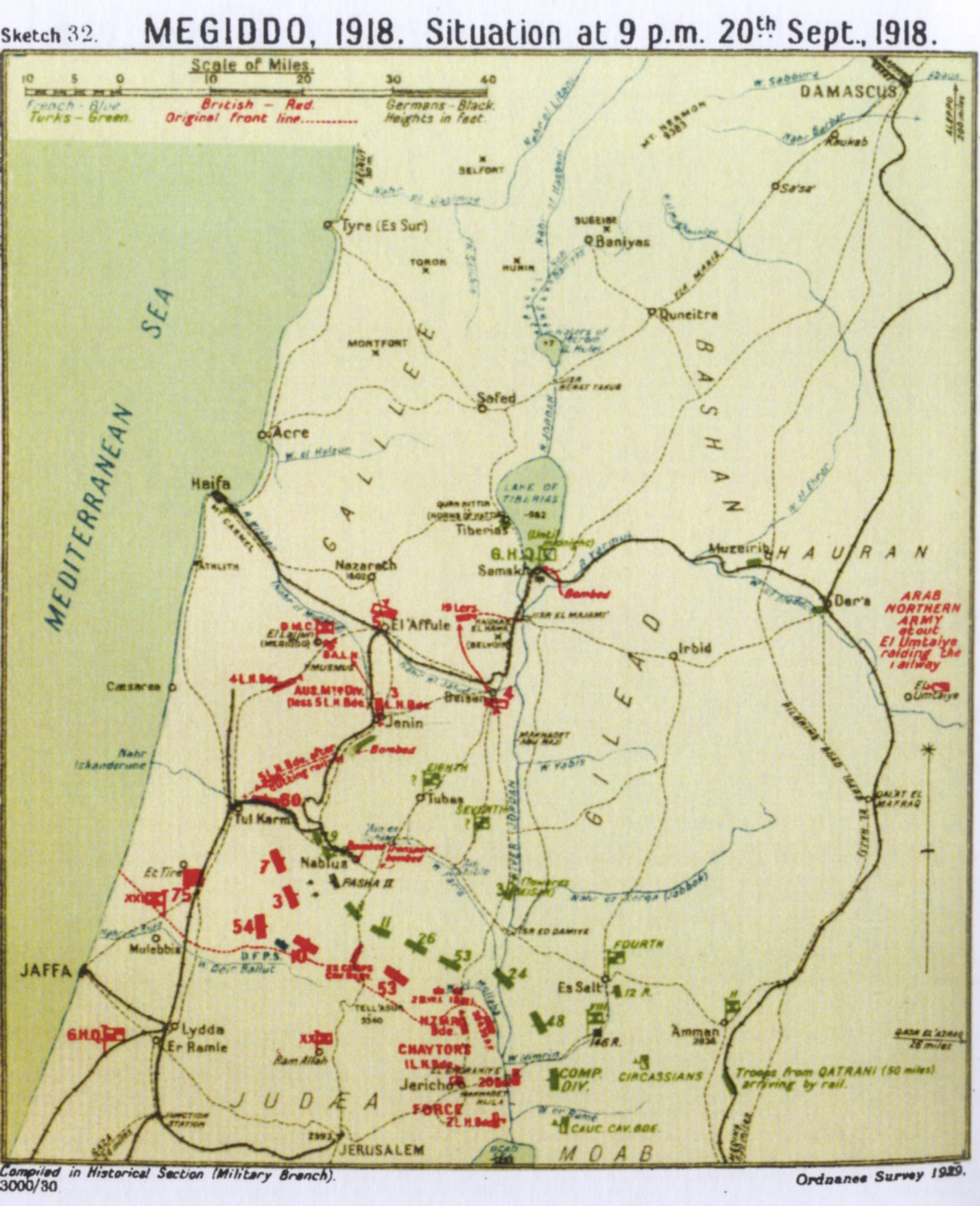
Falls Map 32 Megiddo Situation at 21:00 20 September 1918

The Seventh Army, commanded by Mustafa Kemal Pasa, reported it had repelled virtually all attacks on its front but was about to withdraw to its second line of defences between Kefar Haris and Iskaka, to conform with Oppen's retirement. Liman ordered the 110th Regiment at Nablus and any other troops the commander of the Seventh Army could spare to defend the Tul Karm to Nablus road at 'Anebta, at 12:30 ordering the occupation of the mouth of the Musmus Pass at El Lajjun by six companies and 12 machine guns.

At the end of the day, the front of the British Empire's XXI Corps ran just west of the 54th Division at Bidya, Kh. Kefar Thilth and Azzun through Jiyus west of the 3rd (Lahore) Division at Felamiye through 7th (Meerut) Division at Et Taiyibe, Irta and 60th (2/2nd London) Division at Tul Karm; the heads of the corps' columns describing a virtual straight line from the DFPS at Rafat to Tul Karm.

== Commendation ==
General Edmund Allenby commended Armenian forces in his official dispatch to the Allied High Command,

On the right flank, on the coastal hills, the units of the Armenian Legion d'Orient fought with great valour. Despite the difficulty of the terrain and the strength of the enemy defensive lines, at an early hour, they took the hill of Dir el Kassis.

Allenby remarked,

I am proud to have had an Armenian contingent under my command. They have fought very brilliantly and have played a great part in the victory.

A monument for the Armenian troops killed during the battle was moved from its original location on the battlefield to Mount Zion in October 1925.
