= Sanniriya =

Palestinian town in Qalqilya, State of Palestine

- Municipality type D (Village council)

Arabic transcription(s)
  - Arabic: سنّيريّه
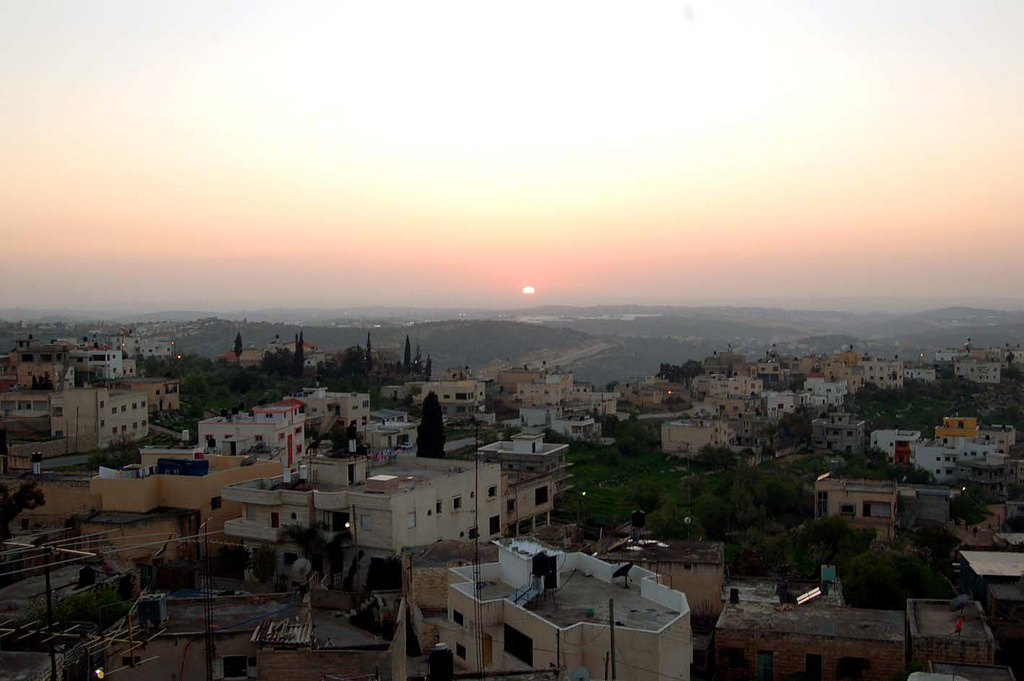
- Sanniriya sunset

- Location of Sanniriya within Palestine
- Coordinates: 32°07′42″N 35°02′49″E
- Palestine grid: 154/170
- State: State of Palestine
- Governorate: Qalqilya
- Founded: 14th century

Government
  - Type: Village council
- Elevation: 229 m (751 ft)

Population (2017)
  - Total: 3,609
- Name meaning: Senirieh p.n.

Sanniriya (Arabic: سنّيريّه) is a Palestinian town in the Qalqilya Governorate in the western area of the West Bank, south of Qalqilya and 36 kilometers (22 mi) southwest of Nablus. According to the Palestinian Central Bureau of Statistics, the village had a population of 3,609 inhabitants in 2017.

== Location ==
Sanniriya is 10.23 kilometers (6.36 mi) southeast of Qalqiliya. It is bordered by Biddya to the east, Mas-ha to the south, Beit ‘Amin to the west, and Kafr Thulth to the north.

== History ==
Sanniriya was founded in the 14th century by Issa as-Saniri, a holy man from Syria, who is buried in the village. Because of his tomb which is venerated by the local inhabitants, religious festivals were held in the village and the Sanniriya Mosque was built adjacent to it also in the 14th century. The prominent clans of the immediate area today—Sheikh, Omar, Ahmad, and Younis—are descendants of as-Saniri. The Abu Hadgi clan migrated to Sanniriya from Deir Istiya.

Potsherds from the Mamluk era has been found in the village, and the mosque has a vaulted burial chamber, and an Arabic inscription from AH 876 (1460 C.E.).

=== Ottoman era ===
During the 16th century, Sanniriya either functioned as a seasonal settlement or was deserted.

In the 18th and 19th centuries, Sanniriya formed part of the highland region known as Jūrat ‘Amra or Bilād Jammā‘īn. Situated between Dayr Ghassāna in the south and the present Route 5 in the north, and between Majdal Yābā in the west and Jammā‘īn, Mardā and Kifl Ḥāris in the east, this area served, according to historian Roy Marom, "as a buffer zone between the political-economic-social units of the Jerusalem and the Nablus regions. On the political level, it suffered from instability due to the migration of the Bedouin tribes and the constant competition among local clans for the right to collect taxes on behalf of the Ottoman authorities."

In 1838, during the late Ottoman era, it was noted as a Muslim village, Senirieh, in Jurat Merda, south of Nablus.

In 1870 the French explorer Victor Guérin visited the village, which he found situated on the top of a hill, with about 700 inhabitants. Many of the houses appeared newly built, only some cisterns appeared old. At the highest point of the hill was a small mosque.

In 1870/1871 (1288 AH), an Ottoman census listed the village with a population of 52 households in the nahiya (sub-district) of Jamma'in al-Awwal, subordinate to Nablus.

In 1882 the PEF's Survey of Western Palestine (SWP) the village (called "Senirieh"), was described as a "small stone village, on a ridge, surrounded with olives, supplied by cisterns."

=== British Mandate era ===
In the 1922 census of Palestine, conducted by the British Mandate authorities, Sanniriya (called "Sainiriyeh") had a population of 529, all Muslims, increasing in the 1931 census when Sannirya (including Khirbat Azztun) had 165 occupied houses and a population of 722, again all Muslim.

In the 1945 statistics the population of Sanniriya was 990 Muslims, while the total land area was 12,685 dunams, according to an official land and population survey. Of this, 2,895 were allocated for plantations and irrigable land, 4,432 for cereals, while 45 dunams were classified as built-up areas.

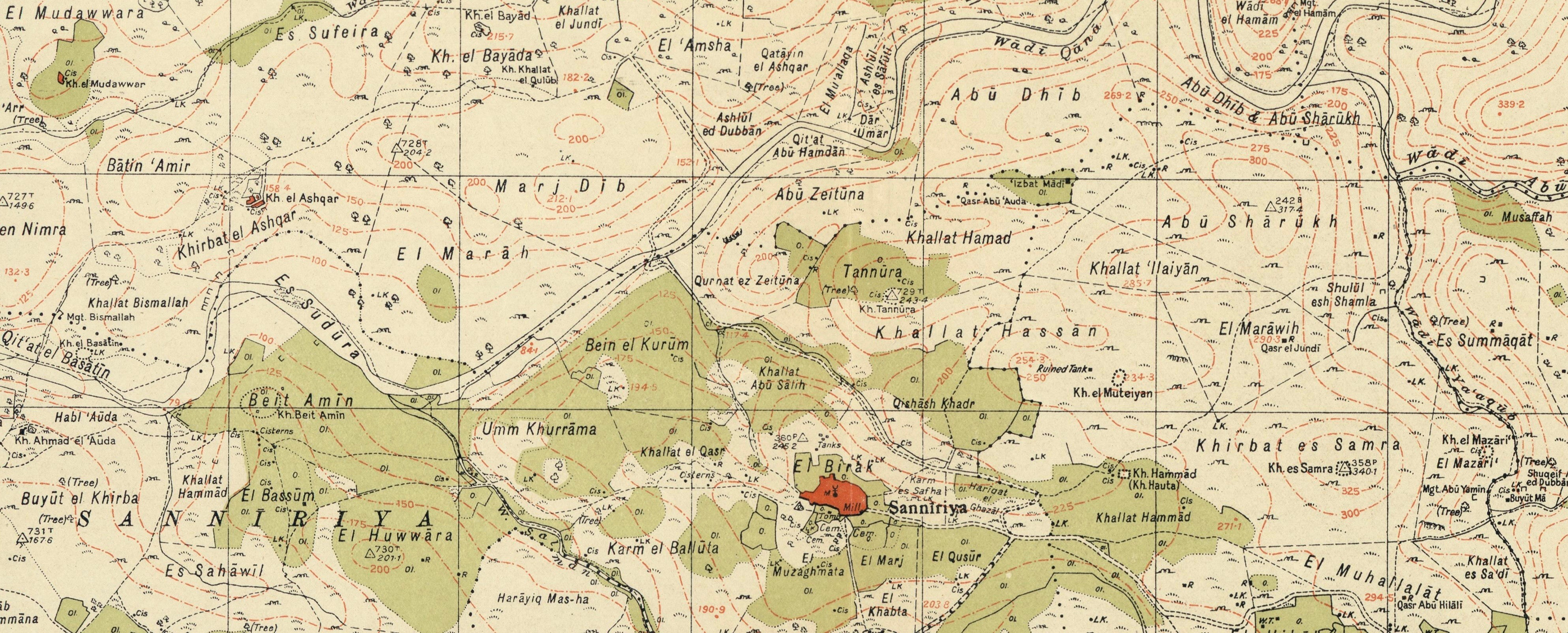
Sanniriya 1943 1:20,000

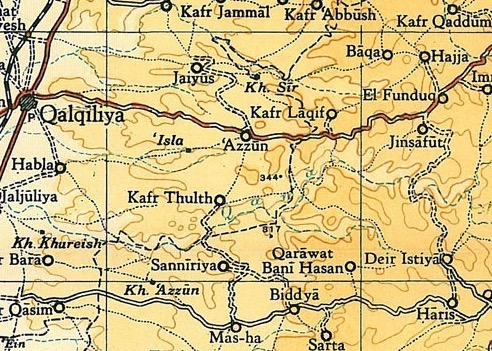
Sanniriya 1945 1:250,000

=== Jordanian era ===
In the wake of the 1948 Arab–Israeli War, and after the 1949 Armistice Agreements, Sanniriya came under Jordanian rule.

The Ahmad and Omar clans began to work the fields west of the village where the land was suitable for agriculture in the 1930s. However, in the 1950s, to avoid continuous long-distance travels, the Ahmad and Omar clans established the villages of Azzun Atma and Beit Amin, respectively. Because of the migration of the two clans, Younis and Sheikh became the dominant families of Sanniriya. Initially, at the beginning of Jordanian rule in the 1950s, water for domestic use was obtained from the nearby Wadi al-Qana. After receiving funds from residents living in the Persian Gulf States, the village economy substantially improved which included a boost in agricultural production, leading to the export of oranges and other products to the Gulf States. Increased income in the village allowed for the inhabitants to dig the first public well in Sanniriya in 1964.

The Jordanian census of 1961 found 1,089 inhabitants.

=== Post-1967 ===
Since the Six-Day War in 1967, Sanniriya has been under Israeli occupation. In 1969, several residents participated in a battle against Israeli forces in the Jordan Valley. Between the late 1970s to 2000, the Israeli settlements of Etz Efraim and Elkana were built on Sanniriya's lands. During the First Intifada that began in 1987, a number of residents were imprisoned for participation in the uprising and two homes were demolished. The West Bank barrier was constructed near Sanniriya, separating them from their former land.

During the First Intifada, a number of residents were imprisoned for participation in the uprising and two homes were demolished.

After the 1995 accords, 21.6% of village land was classified as Area B, the remaining 78.4% as Area C.

== Bibliography ==
- Barron, J.B., ed. (1923). Palestine: Report and General Abstracts of the Census of 1922. Government of Palestine.
- Conder, C.R.; Kitchener, H.H. (1882). The Survey of Western Palestine: Memoirs of the Topography, Orography, Hydrography, and Archaeology. Vol. 2. London: Committee of the Palestine Exploration Fund.
- Finkelstein, I.; Lederman, Zvi, eds. (1997). Highlands of many cultures. Tel Aviv: Institute of Archaeology of Tel Aviv University Publications Section. ISBN 965-440-007-3.
- Government of Jordan, Department of Statistics (1964). First Census of Population and Housing. Volume I: Final Tables; General Characteristics of the Population (PDF).
- Government of Palestine, Department of Statistics (1945). Village Statistics, April, 1945.
- Guérin, V. (1875). Description Géographique Historique et Archéologique de la Palestine (in French). Vol. 2: Samarie, pt. 2. Paris: L'Imprimerie Nationale.
- Hadawi, S. (1970). Village Statistics of 1945: A Classification of Land and Area ownership in Palestine. Palestine Liberation Organization Research Center.
- Mills, E., ed. (1932). Census of Palestine 1931. Population of Villages, Towns and Administrative Areas. Jerusalem: Government of Palestine.
- Palmer, E.H. (1881). The Survey of Western Palestine: Arabic and English Name Lists Collected During the Survey by Lieutenants Conder and Kitchener, R. E. Transliterated and Explained by E.H. Palmer. Committee of the Palestine Exploration Fund.
- Robinson, E.; Smith, E. (1841). Biblical Researches in Palestine, Mount Sinai and Arabia Petraea: A Journal of Travels in the year 1838. Vol. 3. Boston: Crocker & Brewster.
