= Sha'arei Tikva =

Israeli settlement in the West Bank

Sha'arei Tikva: שַׁעֲרֵי תִּקְוָה (Hebrew)

Hebrew transcription(s)
  - Unofficial: Shaare Tikvah
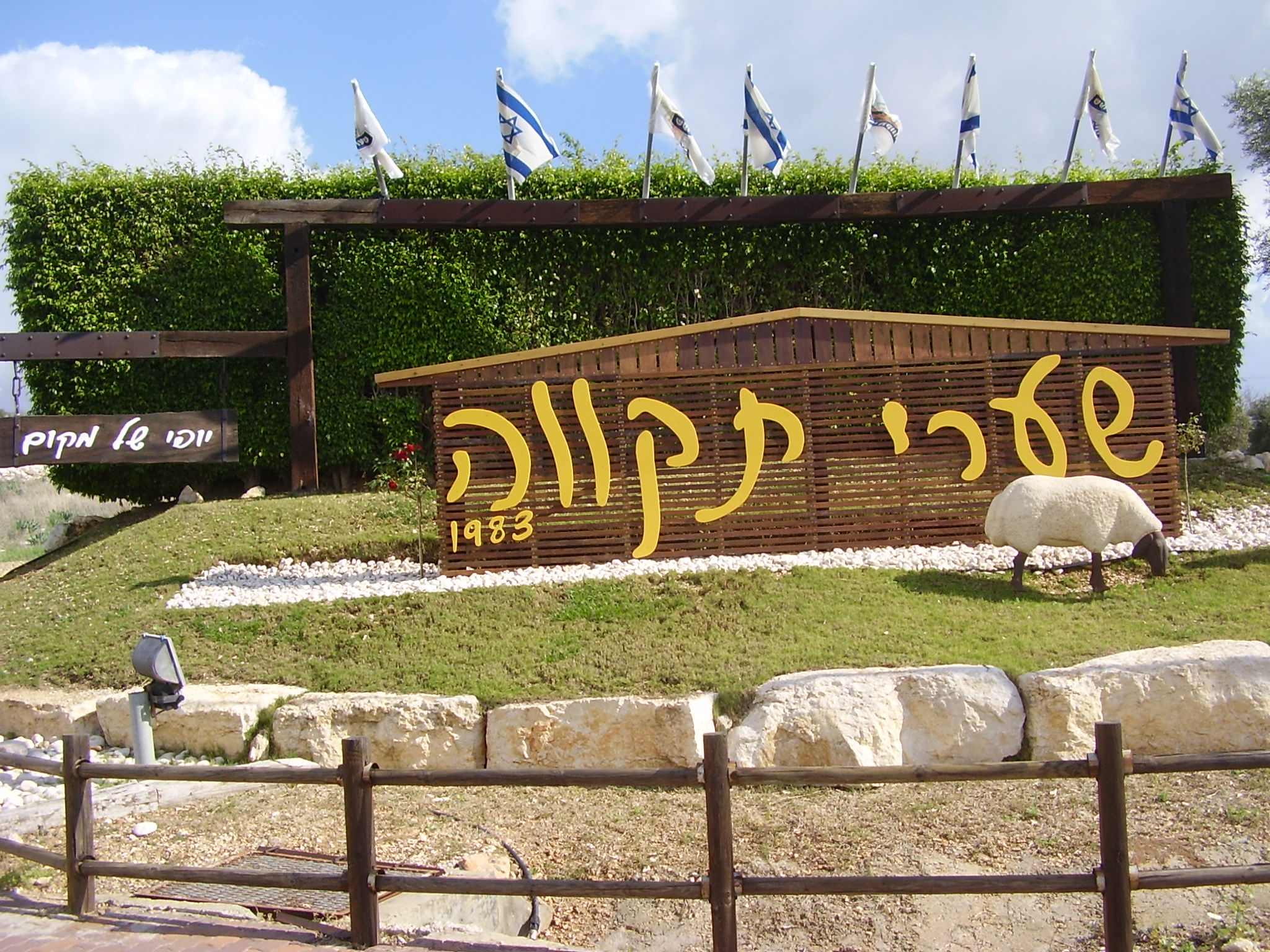
- Entrance to the settlement

- Location within the Northern West Bank Location within the West Bank Location within State of Palestine
- Coordinates: 32°7′22″N 35°1′37″E
- Country: Palestine
- District: Judea and Samaria Area
- Council: Shomron
- Region: West Bank
- Affiliation: Mishkei Herut Beitar
- Founded: 1983
- Founder: Yosh Real Estate Investment
- Population (2021): 6,122
- Website: www.shaarey-tikva.muni.il

Sha'arei Tikva (Hebrew: שַׁעֲרֵי תִּקְוָה, lit. 'Gates of Hope') is an Israeli settlement in the West Bank at an elevation of 200 metres. Located northeast of Rosh HaAyin and one kilometre east of the Green Line near Elkana, it is organised as a community settlement and falls under the jurisdiction of Shomron Regional Council. In 2021 it had a population of 6,122.

The international community considers Israeli settlements in the West Bank illegal under international law, but the Israeli government disputes this.

== History ==
Remains from the Second Temple period have been discovered near the town.

According to ARIJ, Israel confiscated land from three nearby Palestinian villages in order to construct Sha'arei Tikva. The largest part were taken from Azzun Atma, which lost 2,689 dunums to Sha'arei Tikva and Oranit, 8 dunams from Mas-ha, and 3 dunums from Beit Amin.

Sha'arei Tikva was founded in 1983, with the first residents moving there in April 1985. The goal of the founders was to create a mixed religious and secular community. The town was awarded municipal council status in 1990.

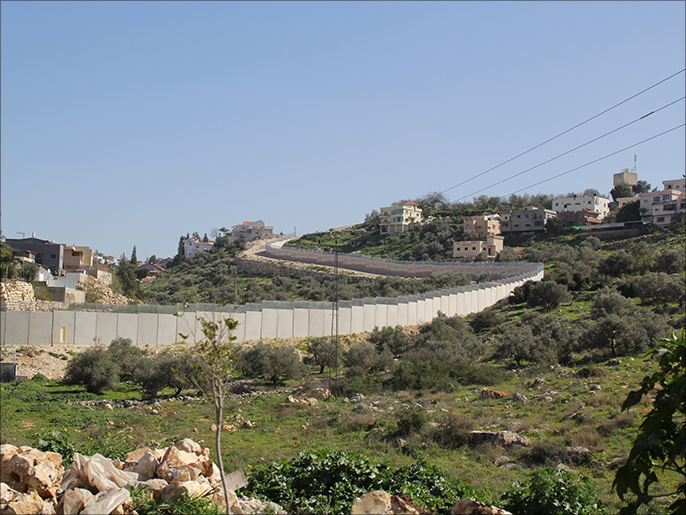
The Palestinian village of Azzun Atma and the Israeli settlement of Sha'arei Tikva, separated by Israeli wall, 2015

== Voting Patterns ==
In the 2022 election, 68 percent of voters in Sha'arei Tikva voted for the parties of the right-wing coalition led by Benjamin Netanyahu, while 24 percent voted for the parties of the center-left coalition led by Yair Lapid and 0.05 percent voted for the Arab parties.

In the 2026 election, 62 percent of voters in Sha'arei Tikva voted for the parties of the right-wing coalition led by Benjamin Netanyahu, while 27 percent voted for the parties of the center-left coalition led by Gadi Eisenkot and 0.04 percent voted for the Arab parties. An additional 5 percent voted for the Reservists, and 6 percent voted for Amcha Yisrael. Voter turnout increased 13 percent from the 2022 election.

== Notable residents ==
- Ravid Plotnik alias Nechi Nech (b. 1988), Israeli rapper
