= Magen Dan =

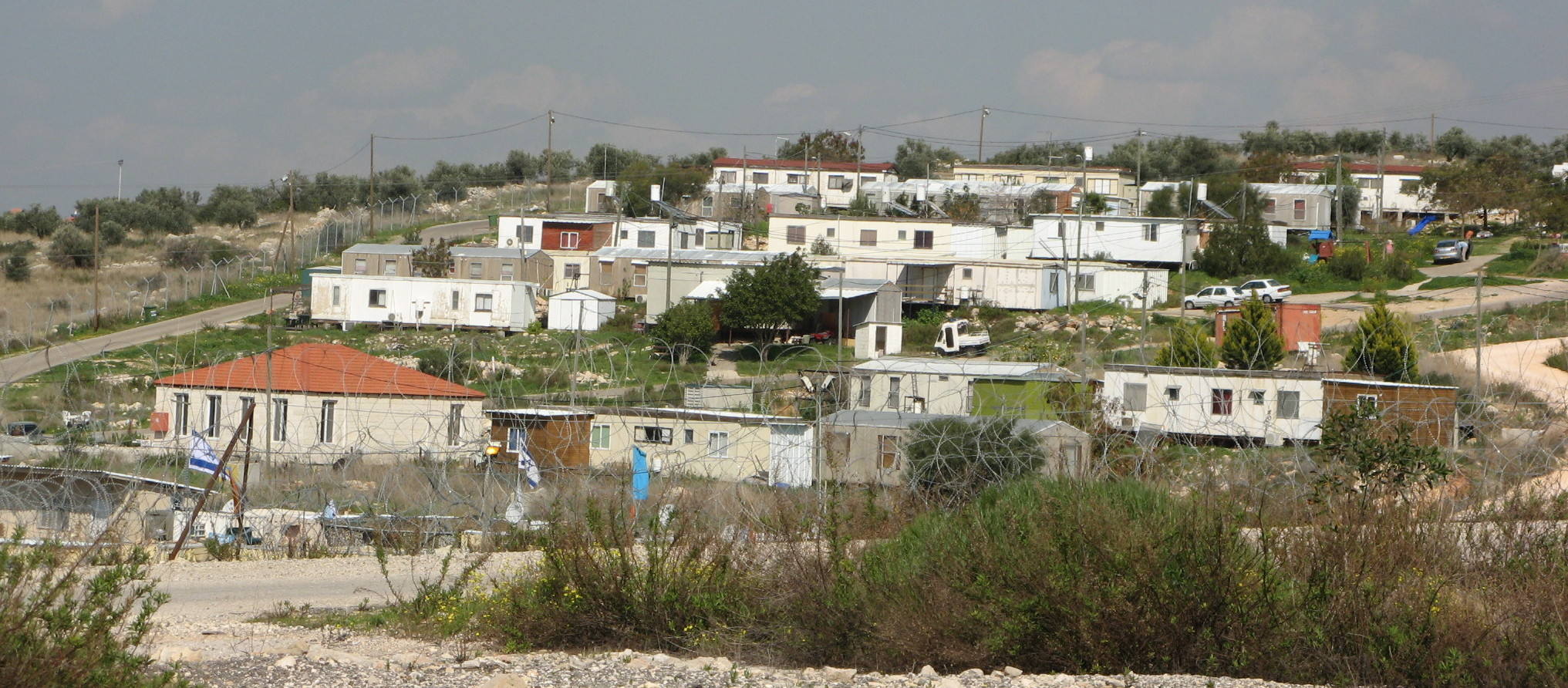

- Location within Central Israel
- Coordinates: 32°06′36″N 35°01′15″E
- Country: Israel
- District: Judea and Samaria Area
- Council: Shomron
- Region: West Bank
- Founded: May 1999

Magen Dan (Hebrew: מגן דן, lit. 'Shield of Dan') is an Israeli outpost in the West Bank. It is located around 750 m (0.47 mi) west of Elkana. It is under the de facto jurisdiction of the Shomron Regional Council. Its existence is illegal under both Israeli and international law.

Construction began in 1995 under the directive of Nissan Slomiansky, but was abandoned following a lone wolf attack. It was re-established in May 1999. According to ARIJ, the land on which the outpost was built was "forcefully seized" from the nearby Palestinian village of Az-Zawiya.

Pushes have been made for it to be officially recognized as a settlement; it was one of 66 outposts which would have been legalized under the revoked Regulation Law. In 25 January 2022, communications minister Yoaz Hendel referred to Magen Dan as a "young settlement" following the installation of fiber-optic cables at the site.
