= Sanniriya Mosque =

Mosque in Qaldilya, West Bank, Palestine

- مسجد سنيريا
- Location of the mosque in the West Bank

Religion
- Affiliation: Islam,Sunni Islam
- Status: Active

Location
- Location: Sanniriya, Qalqilya, Qalqiliya Governorate, West Bank
- Country: Palestine
- Interactive map of Sanniriya Mosque
- Coordinates: 32°07′45″N 35°02′48″E

Architecture
- Completed: 1375

Sanniriya Mosque (Arabic: مسجد سنيريا) is a mosque located in the center of the village of Sanniriya in the Qalqilya Governorate in the West Bank, Palestine. It is considered one of the archaeological and historical landmarks of the Qalqilya Governorate.

== History ==
The construction of the mosque dates back to the year 1375, during the Islamic era, in the period of the Mamluk state.

== Description ==
The mosque consists of two floors: the first dates back to the Mamluk era, while the second is a newer structure built during the Ottoman Empire.

== Architecture ==
- The historic Sanniriya Mosque was built according to the style and principles of Islamic architecture, and it features arches, corners, vaults, and domes.
- On the main entrance of the old mosque are stones engraved with an eight-pointed star and the emblem of the Mamluk state.
- On the southern side of the mosque, there is a small window leading to graves and remnants of ancient ruins, and there is also a cave beneath the mosque’s structure.

== See also ==
- Levantine archaeology
- List of mosques in Palestine
- Islam in Palestine
