= Beit Amin =

- Municipality type D (Village council)

Arabic transcription(s)
  - Arabic: بيت أمين
- Location of Beit Amin within Palestine
- Coordinates: 32°07′52″N 35°01′13″E
- Palestine grid: 152/171
- State: State of Palestine
- Governorate: Qalqilya

Government
  - Type: Village council
- Elevation: 99 m (325 ft)

Population (2017)
  - Total: 1,279
- Name meaning: Khurbet Beit Yemin=The ruin of the house of Yemin, p. n.

Beit Amin (Arabic: بيت أمين) is a Palestinian village in the Qalqilya Governorate in the western West Bank, located south of Qalqilya. According to the Palestinian Central Bureau of Statistics, the village had a population of 1,279 inhabitants in 2017.

== Location ==
Beit Amin is located 8.35 km south-east of Qalqiliya. It is bordered by Sanniriya to the east, Al Mudawwar and ‘Izbat al Ashqar to the south, ‘Izbat Salman to the west, and ‘Azzun ‘Atma to the north.

== History ==
In 1882 the PEF's Survey of Western Palestine noted Khurbet Beit Yemin (under "Archæology"): "Walls, cisterns and rock-cut tomb."

=== British Mandate ===
The village passed to British control they defeated the Ottoman Empire in World War 1. The village was administered under the British Mandate for Palestine until 1948.

=== Jordanian Era ===
In the wake of the 1948 Arab–Israeli War, and after the 1949 Armistice Agreements, Beit Amin came under Jordanian rule.

=== Post-1967 ===
Since the Six-Day War in 1967, Beit Amin has been under Israeli occupation.

After the 1995 accords, about 29.2% of village land was classified as Area B, the remaining 70.8% as Area C. Israel has confiscated land from Beit Amin, ‘Azzun ‘Atma and Mas-ha in order to construct the Israeli settlement of Shi'ar Tikvah. In addition, the Israeli West Bank barrier will isolate some of Beit Amins village land behind the wall.

== Bibliography ==
- Conder, C.R.; Kitchener, H.H. (1882). The Survey of Western Palestine: Memoirs of the Topography, Orography, Hydrography, and Archaeology. Vol. 2. London: Committee of the Palestine Exploration Fund.
- Palmer, E.H. (1881). The Survey of Western Palestine: Arabic and English Name Lists Collected During the Survey by Lieutenants Conder and Kitchener, R. E. Transliterated and Explained by E.H. Palmer. Committee of the Palestine Exploration Fund.
