= Oranit =

Israeli settlement in the West Bank

Oranit: אֳרָנִית, אורנית; أورنيت
- Local council (from 1990)
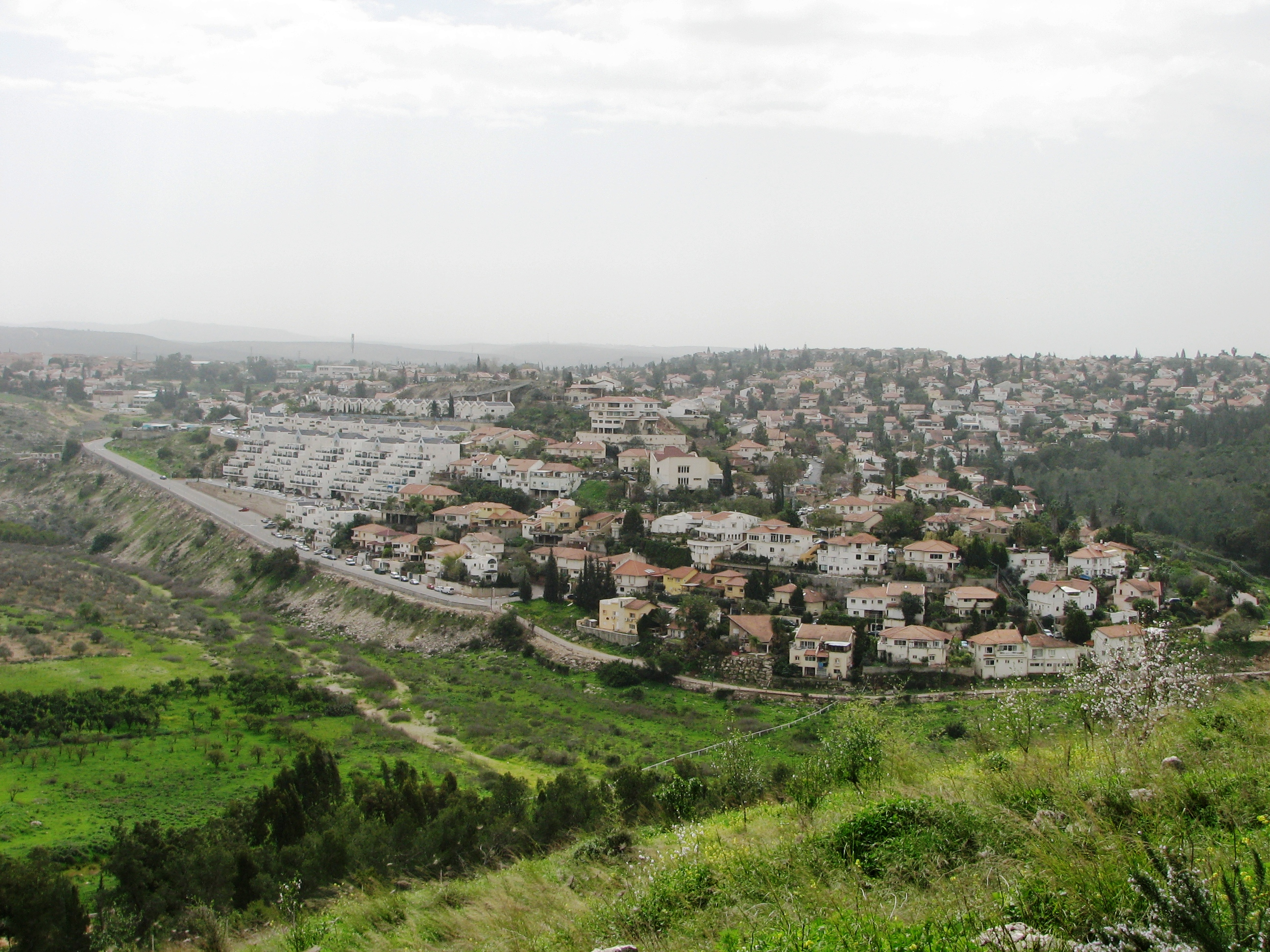

- Location within the Northern West Bank
- Coordinates: 32°7′45.5″N 34°59′42.76″E
- Region: West Bank
- District: Judea and Samaria Area
- Founded: 1983

Government
  - Head of Municipality: Or Piron Zomer

Area
  - Total: 2,069 dunams (2.069 km^{2}; 0.799 sq mi)

Population (2024)
  - Total: 10,089
  - Density: 4,876/km^{2} (12,630/sq mi)
- Name meaning: Little pine
- Website: http://www.oranit.org.il/

Oranit (Hebrew: אֳרָנִית) is an Israeli settlement and local council located in the Seam Zone of the West Bank, abutting and crossing the Green Line. It is surrounded by Horshim forest to the west, Rosh HaAyin and Kfar Qasim to the southwest, Sha'arei Tikva to the east, and Khirbet Abu Salman to the northeast. In 2024 it had a population of 10,089.

The international community considers Israeli settlements illegal under international law, though Israel disputes this.

== History ==
According to ARIJ, Israel confiscated land from two nearby Palestinian villages in order to construct Oranit: most of the land was taken from Azzun Atma, while 6 dunams from ‘Izbat Salman.

In April 1983, the Israeli government approved the establishment of Oranit, one of three settlements planned for "western Samaria".

According to Amnesty International the majority of the land of the neighboring Palestinian village of 'Izbat Salman was lost when Oranit was established, with most of the remainder being effectively lost when the West Bank barrier was built to encompass Oranit and enough surrounding land for future expansion of the settlement. The UN Relief and Works Agency for Palestine Refugees in the Near East has estimated that three Palestinian villages in the vicinity lost 3,000 dunams of land with the creation of Oranit settlement. Thirty Palestinian farmers were initially given access to their farmland through the gates of the settlement. This right was soon withdrawn for "security reasons" and the settlement has since expanded onto this Palestinian farmland.

In 1985, the first residents moved in. In 1990, Oranit achieved local council status. In 2009, Israeli prime minister Benjamin Netanyahu imposed a 10-month freeze on construction in Oranit and other Israeli settlements in the West Bank. Building inspectors of the Israeli military's civil administration issued a stop-work order, sending home a crew of Palestinian laborers who had been employed at a building site in Oranit.

According to Zvika Ma-Yafit, former mayor of Oranit, the town maintains good relations with nearby Kafr Qasim and the two towns have cooperated on environmental projects such as the development of a joint sewage system. Many residents of Kafr Qasim work in Oranit as gardeners and handymen. He says the motive for moving to Oranit is not ideological but quality of life.

== Demographics ==
According to a 2009 survey, the population is young and evenly divided between men and women. Around 15% of the population is Orthodox, two-thirds of whom live in the town's religious neighborhood. Oranit ranked 8 out of 10 on the Israeli socio-economic scale.

== Education and culture ==
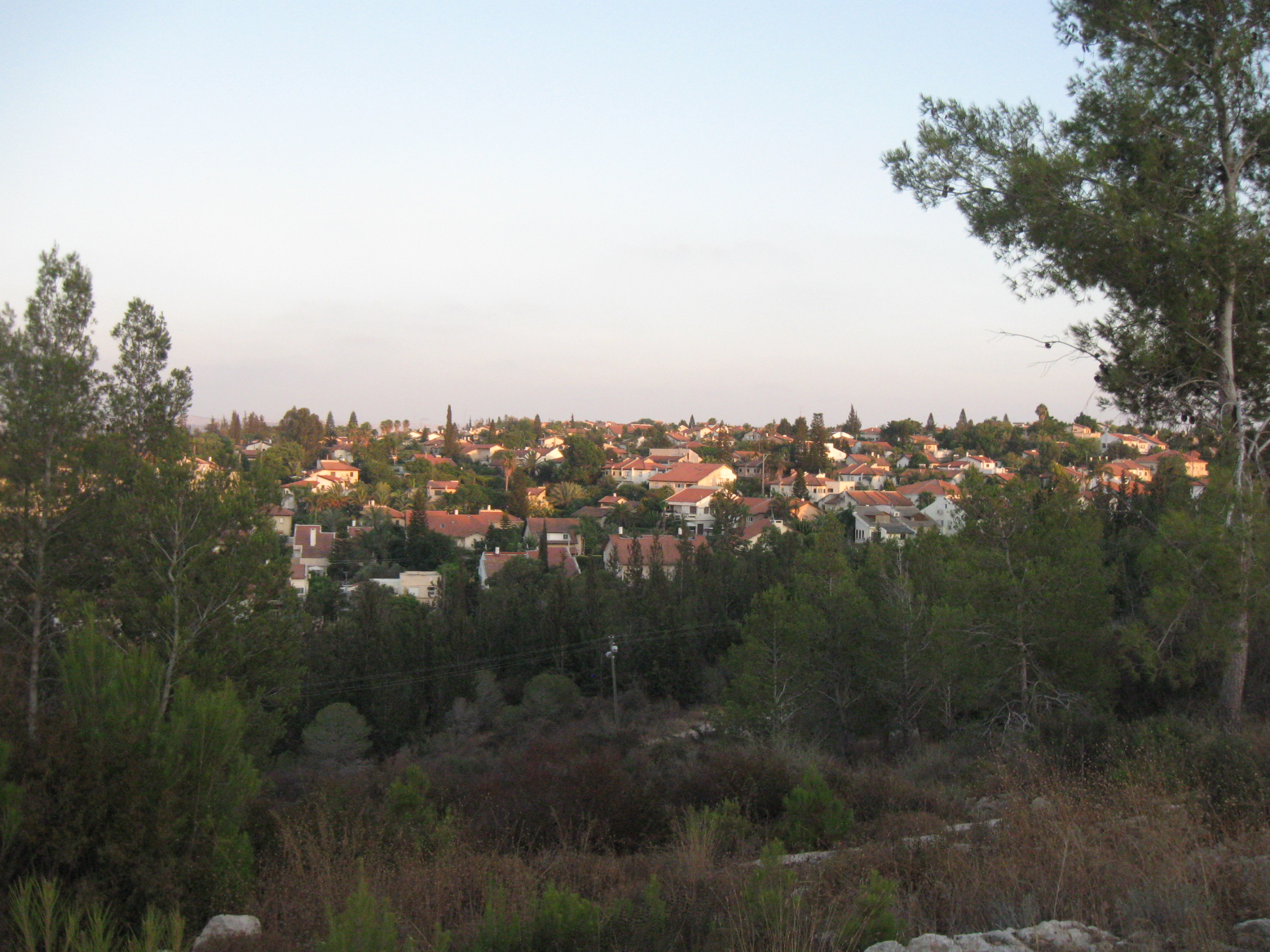
View of Oranit from Horshim forest

In an educational project at MultiCenter, a computer center at Park Afek industrial zone, Israeli and Palestinian children from Oranit, Rosh Ha'ayin and Kafr Qasim created a computer model for a virtual city of coexistence. According to the project director, the children learn about each other's language and culture, discuss strategies for promoting tolerance and avoiding violence, and use a program developed by MultiCenter to create a virtual dream city, complete with a map, logo and charter.

Community facilities include a public swimming pool and tennis courts.

== Voting Patterns ==
In the 2022 election, 53 percent of voters in Oranit voted for the parties of the center-left coalition led by Yair Lapid, while 41 percent voted for the parties of the right-wing coalition led by Benjamin Netanyahu and 0.02 percent voted for the Arab parties.

In the 2026 election, 54 percent of voters in Oranit voted for the parties of the center-left coalition led by Gadi Eisenkot, while 35 percent voted for the parties of the right-wing coalition led by Benjamin Netanyahu and 0.05 percent voted for the Arab parties. An additional 7.2 percent voted for the Reservists, and 3.4 percent voted for Amcha Yisrael. Voter turnout increased 13 percent from the 2022 election.

== Notable residents ==
- Shai Piron (born 1965), Israeli politician (Yesh Atid) and former Minister of Education
