= Az-Zawiya, Salfit =

az-Zawiya
- Municipality type C

Arabic transcription(s)
  - Arabic: الزاويه
  - Latin: az-Zawia (official) al-Zawiya (unofficial)
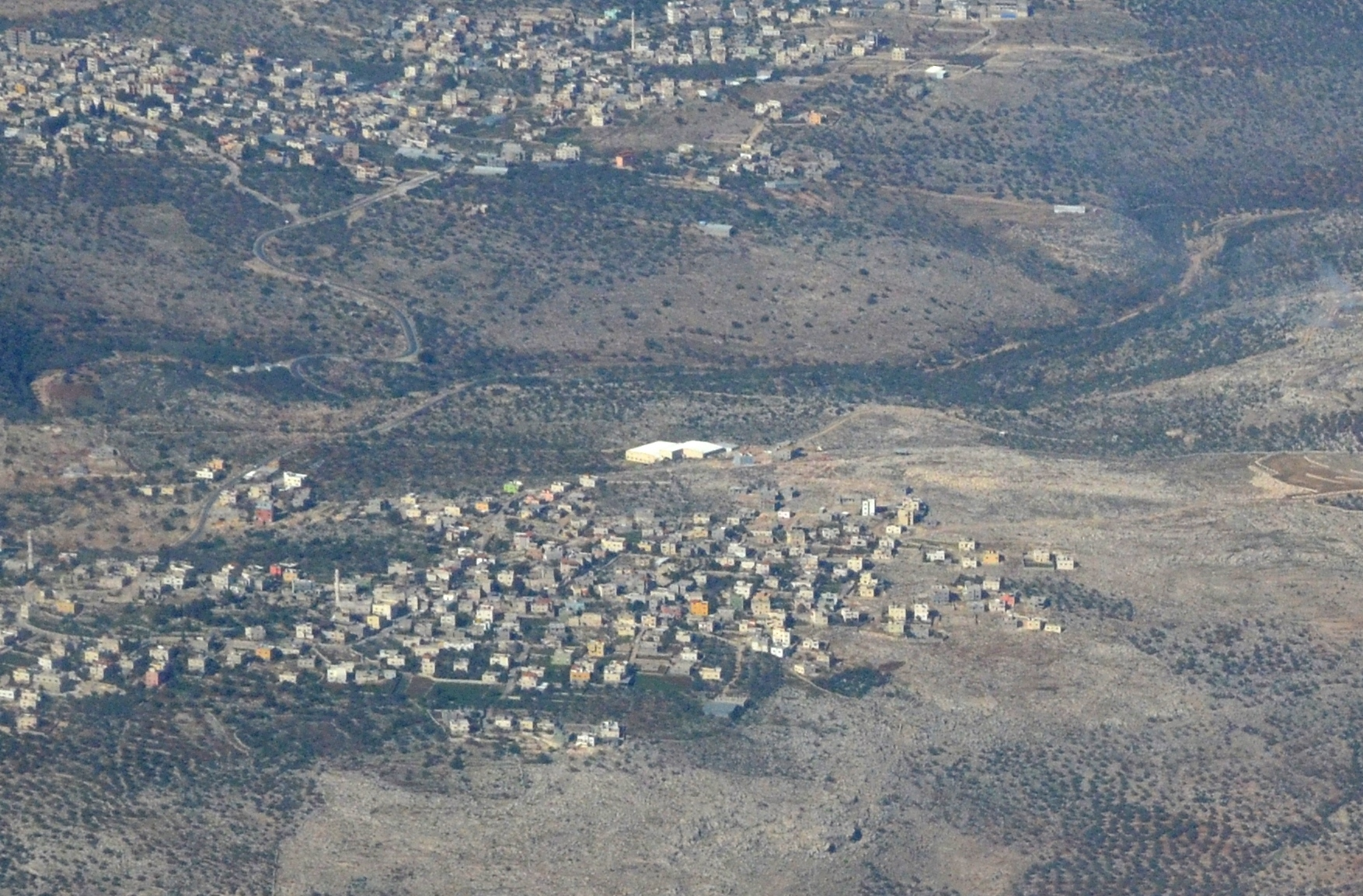
- Az-Zawiya seen in the back, while neighboring Rafat is seen in front

- Location of az-Zawiya within Palestine
- Coordinates: 32°05′45″N 35°02′24″E
- Palestine grid: 153/166
- State: State of Palestine
- Governorate: Salfit

Government
  - Type: Municipality (from 1996)
  - Head of Municipality: Taleb Raddad

Area
  - Total: 2.7 km^{2} (1.0 sq mi)

Population (2017)
  - Total: 6,033
  - Density: 2,200/km^{2} (5,800/sq mi)
- Name meaning: "Corner, hermitage"

Az-Zawiya (Arabic: الزاويه) is a Palestinian town in the Salfit Governorate of the State of Palestine, in the northern West Bank, located west of Salfit and south of Qalqilya. According to the Palestinian Central Bureau of Statistics, az-Zawiya had a population of 6,033 in 2017. The town's population is made up of primarily three families: Shuqeir (45%), Muqadi (30%) and Raddad (20%), while the remaining 5% consists of Palestinian refugee families such as Shamlawi, Rabi and Yusif.

== Location ==
Az Zawiya is 13.5 kilometers (8.4 mi) (horizontally) west of Salfit. It is bordered by Biddya to the east, Rafat to the south, Kafr Qasem to the west, and 'Azzun 'Atma and Mas-ha to the north.

== History ==
Sherds from IA II, Roman and Byzantine eras have been found. Although the site was occupied during the early Ottoman era, no pottery fragments from this specific period were discovered.

=== Ottoman era ===
Zawiya appeared in the 1596 Ottoman tax registers as being in the Nahiya of Jabal Qubal, part of the Sanjak of Nablus. It had a population of 4 households, all Muslim. The villagers paid a fixed tax-rate of 33.3% on agricultural products, including wheat, barley, fruit trees, goats and beehives, in addition to occasional revenues; a total of 800 akçe,

In the 18th and 19th centuries, al-Zawiya formed part of the highland region known as Jūrat ‘Amra or Bilād Jammā‘īn. Situated between Dayr Ghassāna in the south and the present Route 5 in the north, and between Majdal Yābā in the west and Jammā‘īn, Mardā and Kifl Ḥāris in the east, this area served, according to historian Roy Marom, "as a buffer zone between the political-economic-social units of the Jerusalem and the Nablus regions. On the political level, it suffered from instability due to the migration of the Bedouin tribes and the constant competition among local clans for the right to collect taxes on behalf of the Ottoman authorities."

In 1838, Edward Robinson noted it as a village, es-Zawieh, in the Jurat Merda district, south of Nablus.

Victor Guérin visited the village in 1870, and described it as having about 200 inhabitants and a small mosque.

In 1870/1871 (1288 AH), an Ottoman census listed the village in the nahiya (sub-district) of Jamma'in al-Thani, subordinate to Nablus.

In 1882, the PEF's Survey of Western Palestine (SWP) described the village as being of moderate size, "probably an ancient place, having rock-cut tombs to the south."

=== British Mandate era ===
In the 1922 census of Palestine, conducted by the British Mandate authorities, Zawiya (called: Zawiyeh) had a population of 398, 396 Muslims and 2 Christians, both Orthodox, while in the 1931 census it had 122 occupied houses and a population of 513, all Muslim.

In the 1945 statistics the population was 720, all Muslims, while the total land area was 11,516 dunams, according to an official land and population survey. Of this, 964 were allocated for plantations and irrigable land, 2,055 for cereals, while 41 dunams were classified as built-up (urban) areas.

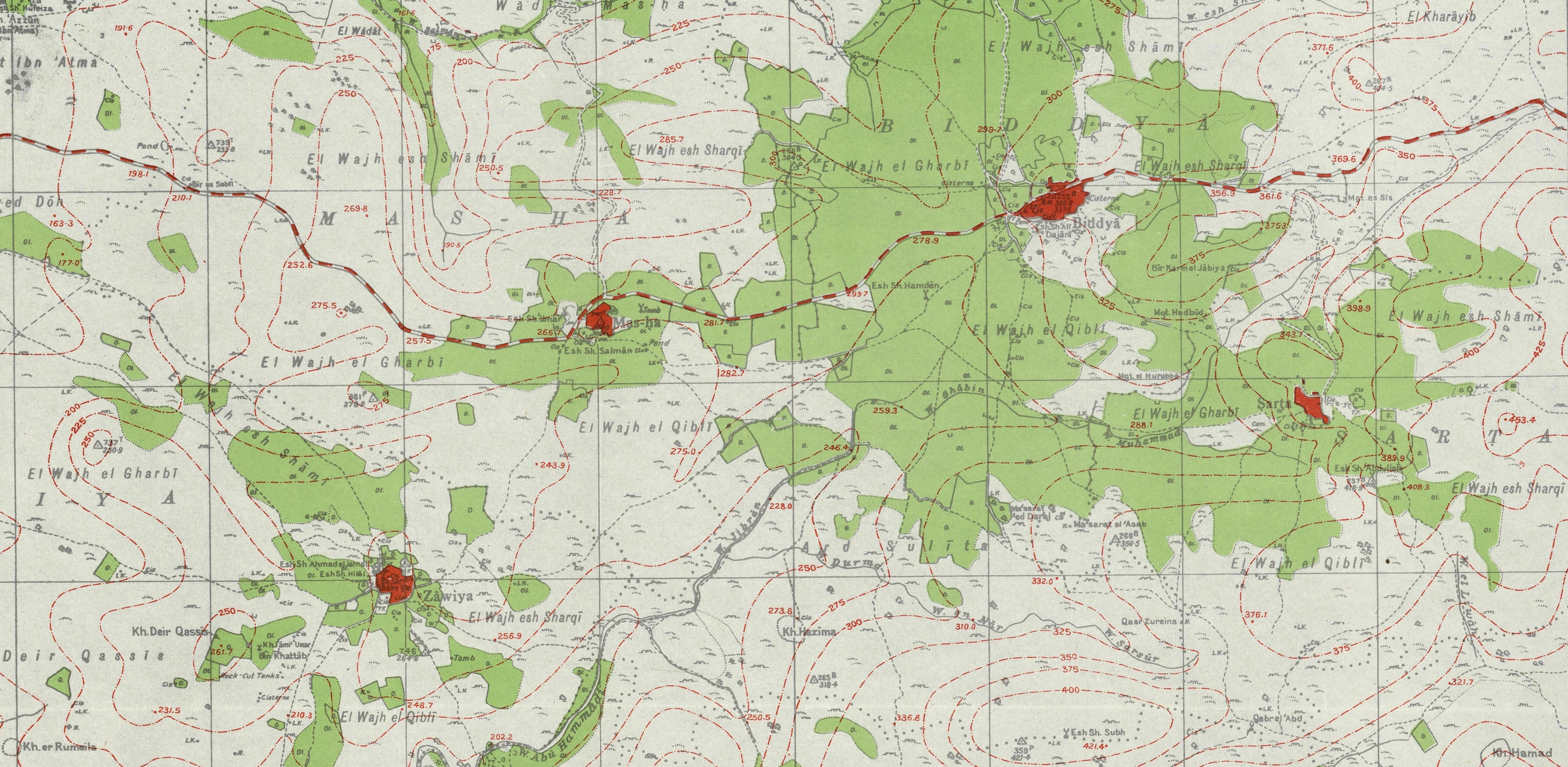
Az-Zawiya 1941 1:20,000

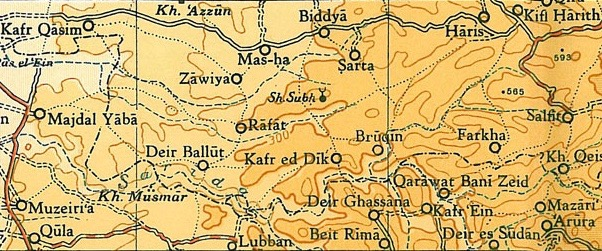
Az-Zawiya 1945 1:250,000

=== Jordanian era ===
In the wake of the 1948 Arab–Israeli War, and after the 1949 Armistice Agreements, Az-Zawiya came under Jordanian rule.

The Jordanian census of 1961 found 1,170 inhabitants.

=== Post-1967 ===
Since the Six-Day War in 1967, Az-Zawiya has been under Israeli occupation.

After the 1995 accords, 9.5% of village land was classified as Area B, the remaining 90.5% as Area C.

Israel confiscated 662 dunams of Zawiya land to establish an Israeli quarry to the west of the town. The quarry, (also called the Nahal Raba quarry, and Mazor Atiqa), is now isolated from az-Zawiya and Rafat behind the West Bank barrier in the Seam Zone. A local subsidiary of HeidelbergCement now operates the quarry.

In 2004, one Israeli, one Palestinian were arrested and 40 were wounded in anti-wall protest at Az-Zawiya.

The Israeli outpost Magen Dan was established after settlers forcefully seized 76 dunums of village land from Zawiya.

Agriculture is the town's main economic sector with olives, figs, almonds, lentils and wheat being the primary crops. There are over 2,700 dunams of land making up az-Zawiya's jurisdiction, of which 900 is built-up area. Sheep is the main livestock grazed in az-Zawiya. There are also small industries such as sewing, carpentry and metal-working. There are over 120 shops in the town. The Second Intifada has drastically decreased revenue from agricultural exports to Israel and Jordan, slashing prices in half.

Az-Zawiya is governed by a municipal council whose members are elected every four years. The town has been a municipality since 1996. Mayor Taleb Raddad (Abu al-Adeeb) has been elected mayor in each local election, serving for three terms. Az-Zawiya has two medical clinics, two boys' schools and two girls' schools. The town will be enclosed on four sides with the completion of the separation barrier forming the az-Zawiya enclave.

In 2001 Israeli settlers raided the area destroying 25 dunams of olive groves contiguous to Highway 5.

== Archaeology ==
Az-Zawiya contains an ancient ruin called Deir Qassis, where sherds from IA I, IA II, Persian, Byzantine, Umayyad/Abbasid, Crusader/Ayyubid and Mamluk eras have been found.

Deir Qassis was examined in 1870:

First I examined a great birket 28 paces long and 25 broad; it is partly cut in the rock, and partly constructed of great blocks with a boss and covered with thick cement. Before this basin lies a platform covered with little cubes of white mosaic, which shows that it was formerly paved. The group of houses which once stood in this place form a mass of rubbish of all kinds heaped upon the ground. A little mosque is alone standing: its lintel is apparently ancient, but the decorations are Arabic. Above the lintel is a pointed arch, whose principal feature is a broad voussoir furrowed by little canals perpendicular to the curve, like pipes, arranged to resemble a series of very narrow key-stones separated by deep joints. This disposition is met with in a large number of ancient mosques round and above the doors. It is also found in several churches of Palestine, especially that of the Holy Sepulchre and that of Saint Anne, the Christians having borrowed this method of decoration from the Arabs [..] 'At some distance from the mosque there are ancient quarries and several tombs, rock-cut.

In the late 19th century, the following archeological remains were noted: "On a hill west of the village there are some rude tombs; one is an arcosolium, with a loculus sunk beneath. The height of the arch is 4 feet 6 inches, the diameter 8 feet, the tomb within 5 feet 6 inches long, and the arch 5 feet to the back."

Later examination has revealed that the main remains are from the late Roman and Byzantine eras.

== Bibliography ==
- Barron, J.B., ed. (1923). Palestine: Report and General Abstracts of the Census of 1922. Government of Palestine.
- Conder, C.R.; Kitchener, H.H. (1882). The Survey of Western Palestine: Memoirs of the Topography, Orography, Hydrography, and Archaeology. Vol. 2. London: Committee of the Palestine Exploration Fund.
- Dauphin, C. (1998). La Palestine byzantine, Peuplement et Populations. BAR International Series 726 (in French). Vol. III : Catalogue. Oxford: Archeopress. ISBN 0-860549-05-4.
- Finkelstein, I.; Lederman, Zvi, eds. (1997). Highlands of many cultures. Tel Aviv: Institute of Archaeology of Tel Aviv University Publications Section. ISBN 965-440-007-3.
- Government of Jordan, Department of Statistics (1964). First Census of Population and Housing. Volume I: Final Tables; General Characteristics of the Population (PDF).
- Government of Palestine, Department of Statistics (1945). Village Statistics, April, 1945.
- Guérin, V. (1875). Description Géographique Historique et Archéologique de la Palestine (in French). Vol. 2: Samarie, pt. 2. Paris: L'Imprimerie Nationale.
- Hadawi, S. (1970). Village Statistics of 1945: A Classification of Land and Area ownership in Palestine. Palestine Liberation Organization Research Center.
- Hütteroth, W.-D.; Abdulfattah, K. (1977). Historical Geography of Palestine, Transjordan and Southern Syria in the Late 16th Century. Erlanger Geographische Arbeiten, Sonderband 5. Erlangen, Germany: Vorstand der Fränkischen Geographischen Gesellschaft. ISBN 3-920405-41-2.
- Mills, E., ed. (1932). Census of Palestine 1931. Population of Villages, Towns and Administrative Areas. Jerusalem: Government of Palestine.
- Palmer, E. H. (1881). The Survey of Western Palestine: Arabic and English Name Lists Collected During the Survey by Lieutenants Conder and Kitchener, R. E. Transliterated and Explained by E.H. Palmer. Committee of the Palestine Exploration Fund.
- Pringle, D. (1993). The Churches of the Crusader Kingdom of Jerusalem: A-K (excluding Acre and Jerusalem). Vol. I. Cambridge University Press. ISBN 0-521-39036-2.
- Robinson, E.; Smith, E. (1841). Biblical Researches in Palestine, Mount Sinai and Arabia Petraea: A Journal of Travels in the year 1838. Vol. 3. Boston: Crocker & Brewster.
