= Mas-ha =

- Municipality type D (Village council)

Arabic transcription(s)
  - Arabic: مسحة
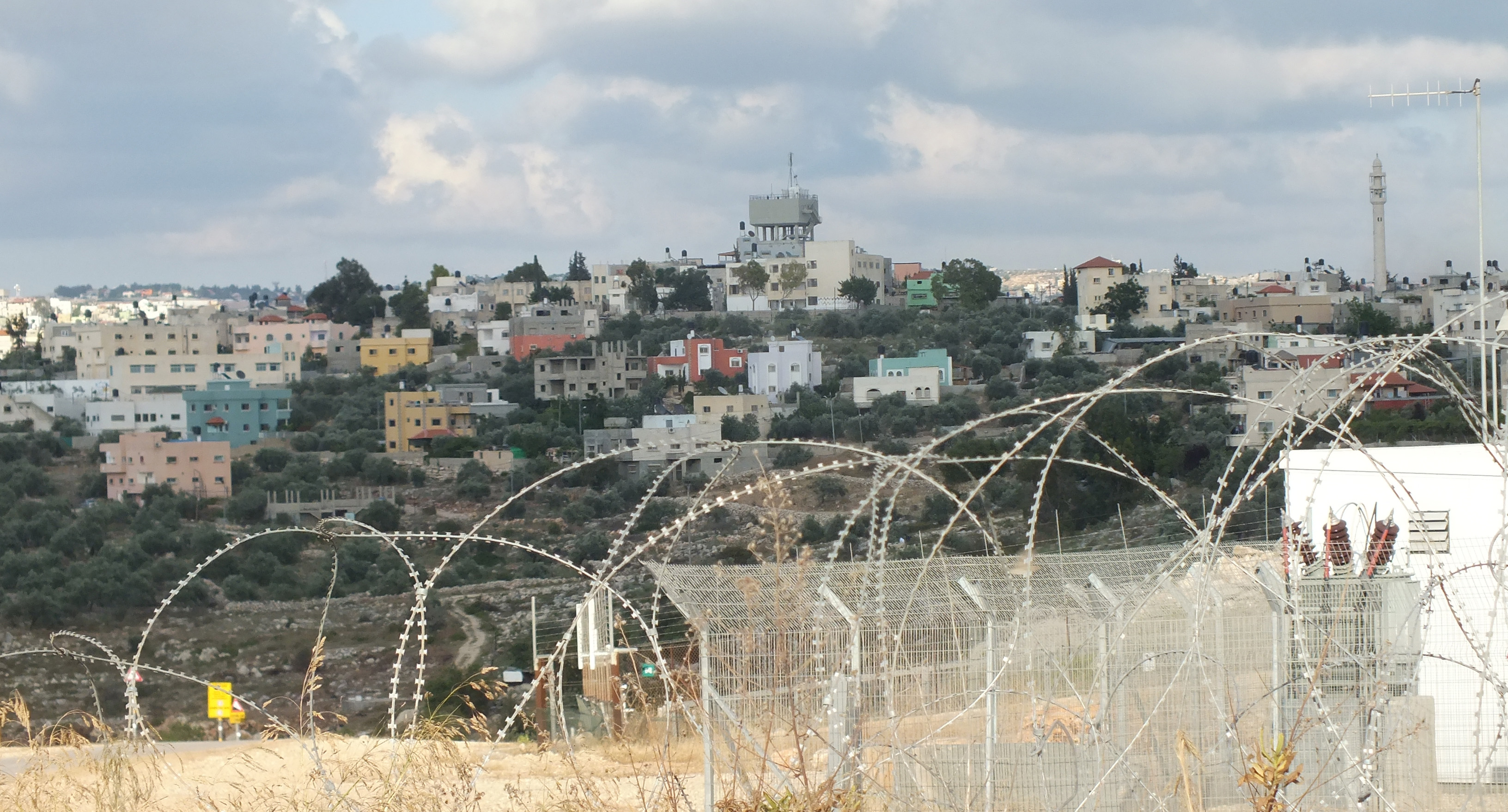
- Mas'ha, seen from Elkana

- Location of Mas-ha within Palestine
- Coordinates: 32°06′28″N 35°03′06″E
- Palestine grid: 155/168
- State: State of Palestine
- Governorate: Salfit

Government
  - Type: Village council
- Elevation: 281 m (922 ft)

Population (2017)
  - Total: 2,370
- Name meaning: "Gravelly soil"

Mas-ha (Arabic: مسحة) is a Palestinian village in the Salfit Governorate in the northern West Bank, 24 kilometers southwest of Nablus. According to the Palestinian Central Bureau of Statistics, it had a population of 2,370 in 2017.

== Location ==
Mas-ha is 12.5 kilometers (7.8 mi) north-west of Salfit. It is bordered by Biddya to the east, Az Zawiya to the south, Azzun Atma to the west, and Sanniriya and Beit Amin to the north.

== History ==
Potsherds from the Byzantine, Byzantine/Umayyad, Crusader/Ayyubid and Mamluk era have been found here. In the northwest of the village, a few reused bossed stones were found by the survey team.

=== Ottoman era ===
Potsherds from the early Ottoman era have also been found. Masha appeared in 1596 Ottoman tax registers as being in the Nahiya of Jabal Qubal, part of the Sanjak of Nablus. It had a population of five households, all Muslim. They paid a fixed tax rate of 33.3% on agricultural products, including wheat, barley, summer crops, olive trees, goats and beehives, a press for olives or grapes, and occasional revenues and a fixed tax for people of Nablus area; a total of 2,300 akçe.

In the 18th and 19th centuries, Mas-ha formed part of the highland region known as Jūrat ‘Amra or Bilād Jammā‘īn. Situated between Dayr Ghassāna in the south and the present Route 5 in the north, and between Majdal Yābā in the west and Jammā‘īn, Mardā and Kifl Ḥāris in the east, this area served, according to historian Roy Marom, "as a buffer zone between the political-economic-social units of the Jerusalem and the Nablus regions. On the political level, it suffered from instability due to the migration of the Bedouin tribes and the constant competition among local clans for the right to collect taxes on behalf of the Ottoman authorities."

In 1838, Edward Robinson noted it as a village, Mes-ha, in the Jurat Merda district, south of Nablus.

French explorer Victor Guérin passed by the village in 1870, and estimated it as having about 300–350 inhabitants, and fig-tree lined borders.

In 1870/1871 (1288 AH), an Ottoman census listed the village in the nahiya (sub-district) of Jamma'in al-Thani, subordinate to Nablus.

In 1882 the PEF's Survey of Western Palestine (SWP) described Mes-ha as "a good-sized village, with a high central house, but partly ruinous. It is supplied by cisterns, and the houses are of stone."

=== British Mandate era ===
In the 1922 census of Palestine conducted by the British Mandate authorities, Mas-ha (called: Masha) had a population of 80, all Muslims, increasing slightly in the 1931 census to 87 Muslims in a total of 20 houses.

In the 1945 statistics the population was 110, all Muslims, while the total land area was 8,263 dunams, according to an official land and population survey. Of this, 1,612 were allocated for plantations and irrigable land, 2,482 for cereals, while 18 dunams were classified as built-up (urban) areas.

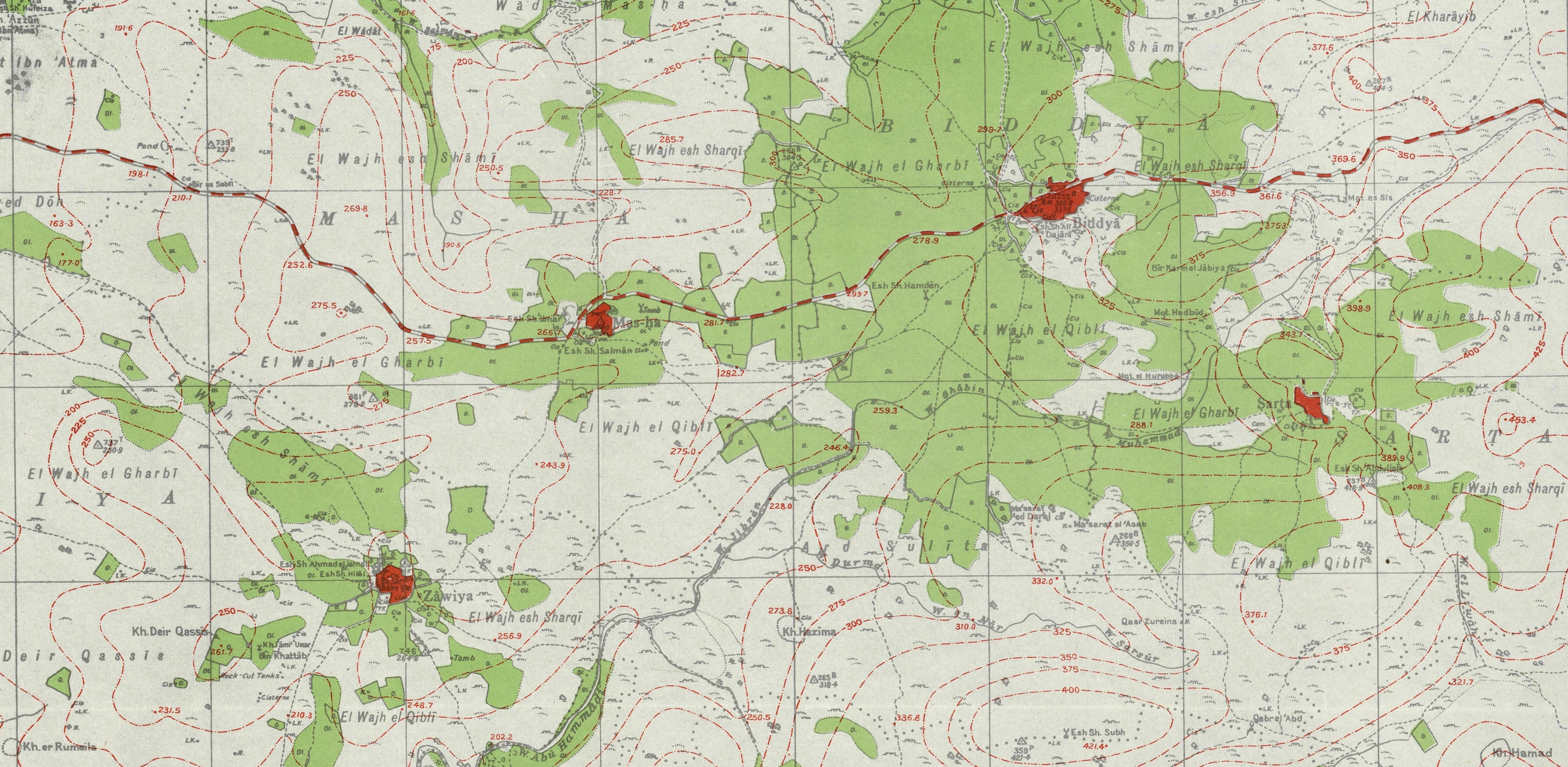
Mas-ha 1941 1:20,000

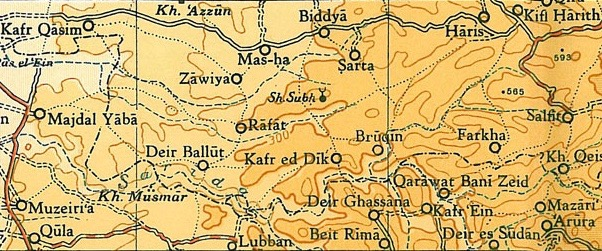
Mas-ha 1945 1:250,000

=== Jordanian era ===
In the wake of the 1948 Arab–Israeli War, and after the 1949 Armistice Agreements, Mas-ha came under Jordanian rule.

In 1961, the population was 478.

=== Post-1967 ===
Since the Six-Day War in 1967, Mas-ha has been under Israeli occupation.

In the early 2000s, there were several protest against the plans of the building of the Israeli West Bank barrier, which would cut off Mas-ha villagers from much of their land. The protest, which resulted in the shooting of one Israeli citizen in 2003, were ultimately unsuccessful.

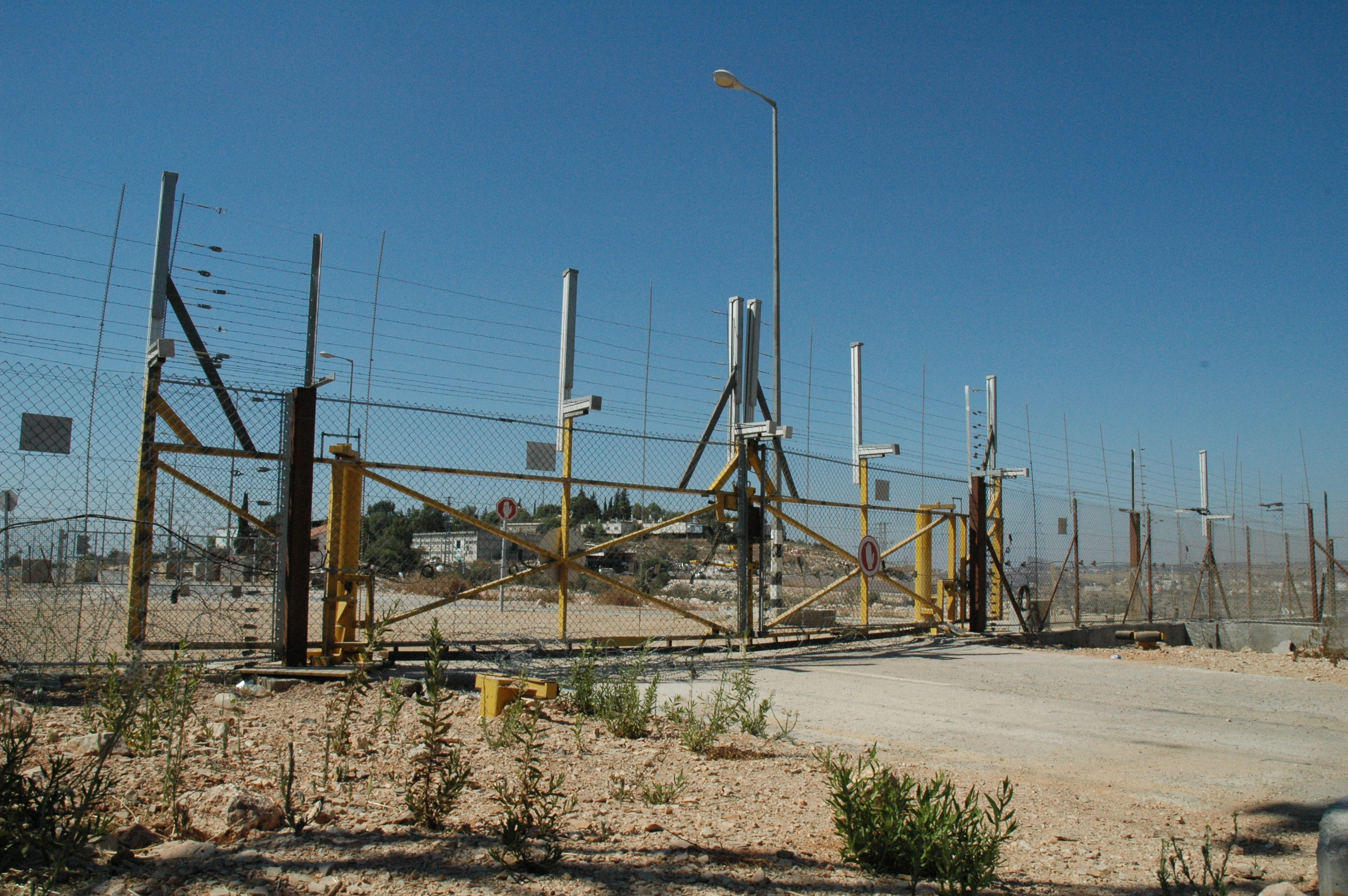
Israeli barrier separating Mas-ha from the Jewish settlement of Elkana, 2004

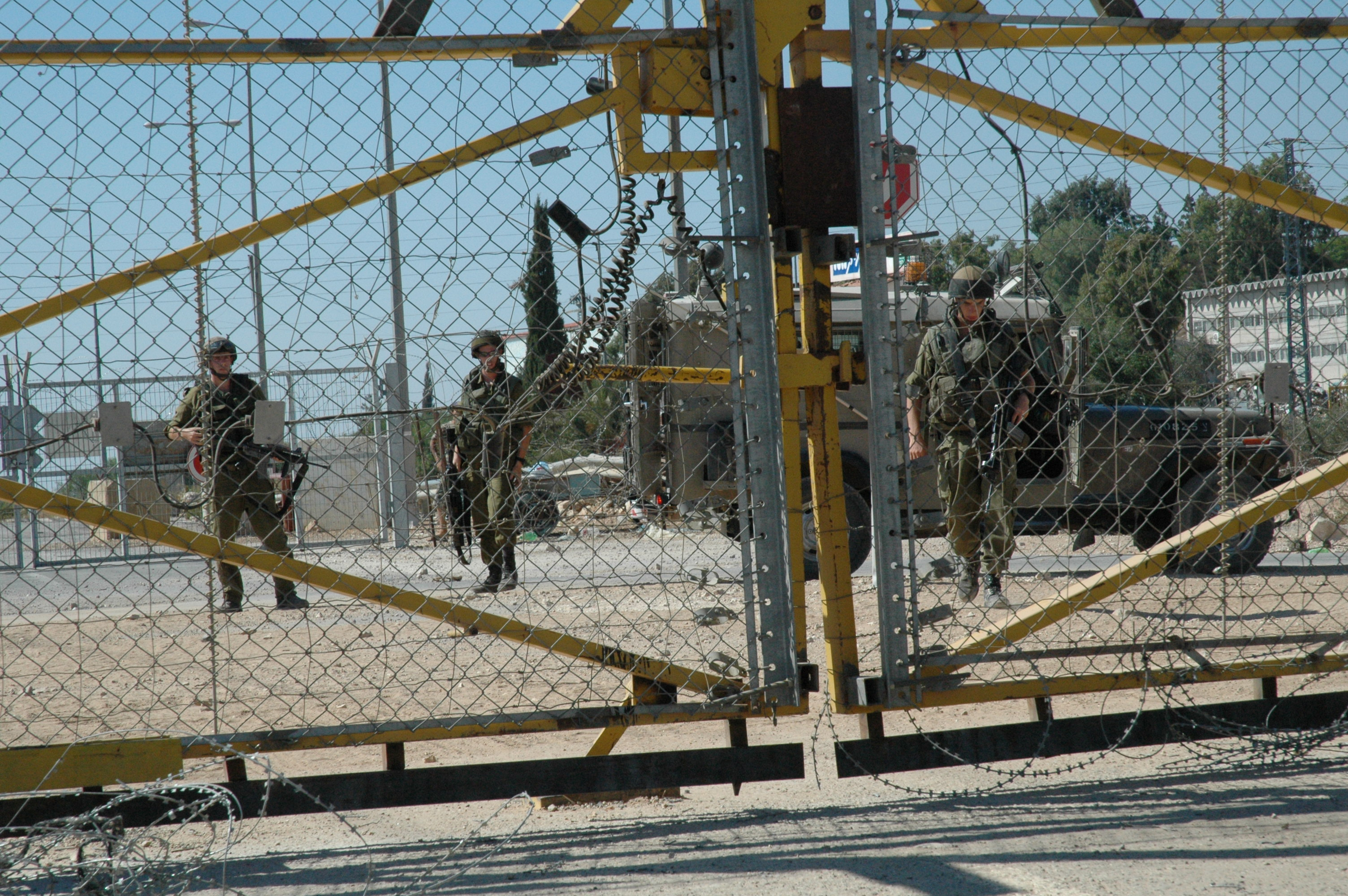
Israeli soldiers at the entrance to the fence, 2004

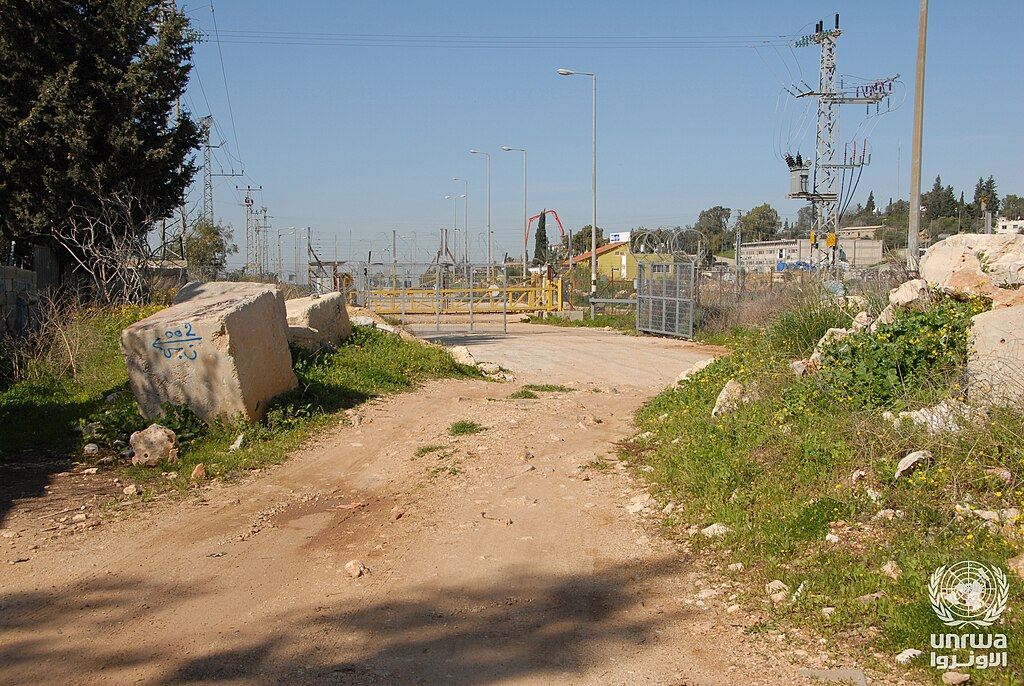
The construction of the Israeli barrier has separated a family from the rest of the village. Their access to the village depends solely on the Israeli army

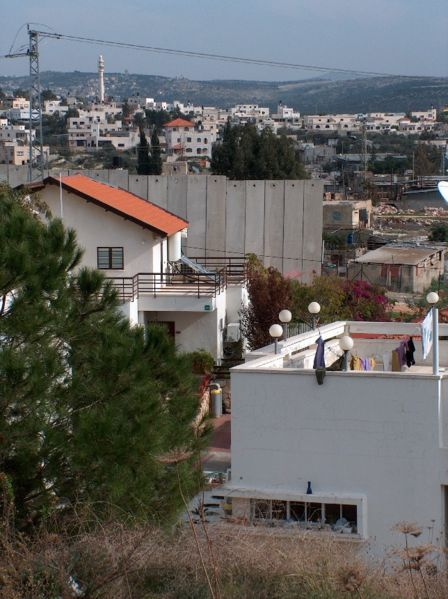
In the foreground, the Israeli settlement of Elkana, built on the confiscated land of Masha. Behind the Israeli wall, the village of Masha, November 2006

==== Loss of land ====
Mas-ha has been subjected to numerous Israeli confiscations for the benefit of various Israeli objectives. ARIJ lists the losses as follows:

Israeli Settlements bordering Mas-ha village and land loss
| Settlement | Date of establishment | Pop 2013 | Area confiscated from Mas-ha |
|---|---|---|---|
| Elkana | 1977 | 3,719 | 1,626 |
| Etz Efraim | 1985 | 731 | 546 |
| Sha'arei Tikva | 1982 | 4,493 | 8 |
| Bnot Orot Yisrael | 1989 | – | 176 |
| Total | | 8,943 | 2,356 |
Source: ARIJ 2013

==== See also ====
- The Color of Olives, documentary film about the Amer family, in Mas-ha

== Bibliography ==
- Barron, J.B., ed. (1923). Palestine: Report and General Abstracts of the Census of 1922. Government of Palestine.
- Conder, C.R.; Kitchener, H.H. (1882). The Survey of Western Palestine: Memoirs of the Topography, Orography, Hydrography, and Archaeology. Vol. 2. London: Committee of the Palestine Exploration Fund.
- Finkelstein, I.; Lederman, Zvi, eds. (1997). Highlands of many cultures. Tel Aviv: Institute of Archaeology of Tel Aviv University Publications Section. ISBN 965-440-007-3.
- Government of Jordan, Department of Statistics (1964). First Census of Population and Housing. Volume I: Final Tables; General Characteristics of the Population (PDF).
- Government of Palestine, Department of Statistics (1945). Village Statistics, April, 1945.
- Guérin, V. (1875). Description Géographique Historique et Archéologique de la Palestine (in French). Vol. 2: Samarie, pt. 2. Paris: L'Imprimerie Nationale.
- Hadawi, S. (1970). Village Statistics of 1945: A Classification of Land and Area ownership in Palestine. Palestine Liberation Organization Research Center.
- Hütteroth, W.-D.; Abdulfattah, K. (1977). Historical Geography of Palestine, Transjordan and Southern Syria in the Late 16th Century. Erlanger Geographische Arbeiten, Sonderband 5. Erlangen, Germany: Vorstand der Fränkischen Geographischen Gesellschaft. ISBN 3-920405-41-2.
- Mills, E., ed. (1932). Census of Palestine 1931. Population of Villages, Towns and Administrative Areas. Jerusalem: Government of Palestine.
- Palmer, E.H. (1881). The Survey of Western Palestine: Arabic and English Name Lists Collected During the Survey by Lieutenants Conder and Kitchener, R. E. Transliterated and Explained by E.H. Palmer. Committee of the Palestine Exploration Fund.
- Reinhart, T. (2006). The Road Map to Nowhere: Israel/Palestine Since 2003. London; New York: Verso. ISBN 1-84467-076-7.
- Robinson, E.; Smith, E. (1841). Biblical Researches in Palestine, Mount Sinai and Arabia Petraea: A Journal of Travels in the year 1838. Vol. 3. Boston: Crocker & Brewster.
