= Biddya =

- Municipality type C

Arabic transcription(s)
  - Arabic: بديا
  - Latin: Biddia (official); Bedia (unofficial)
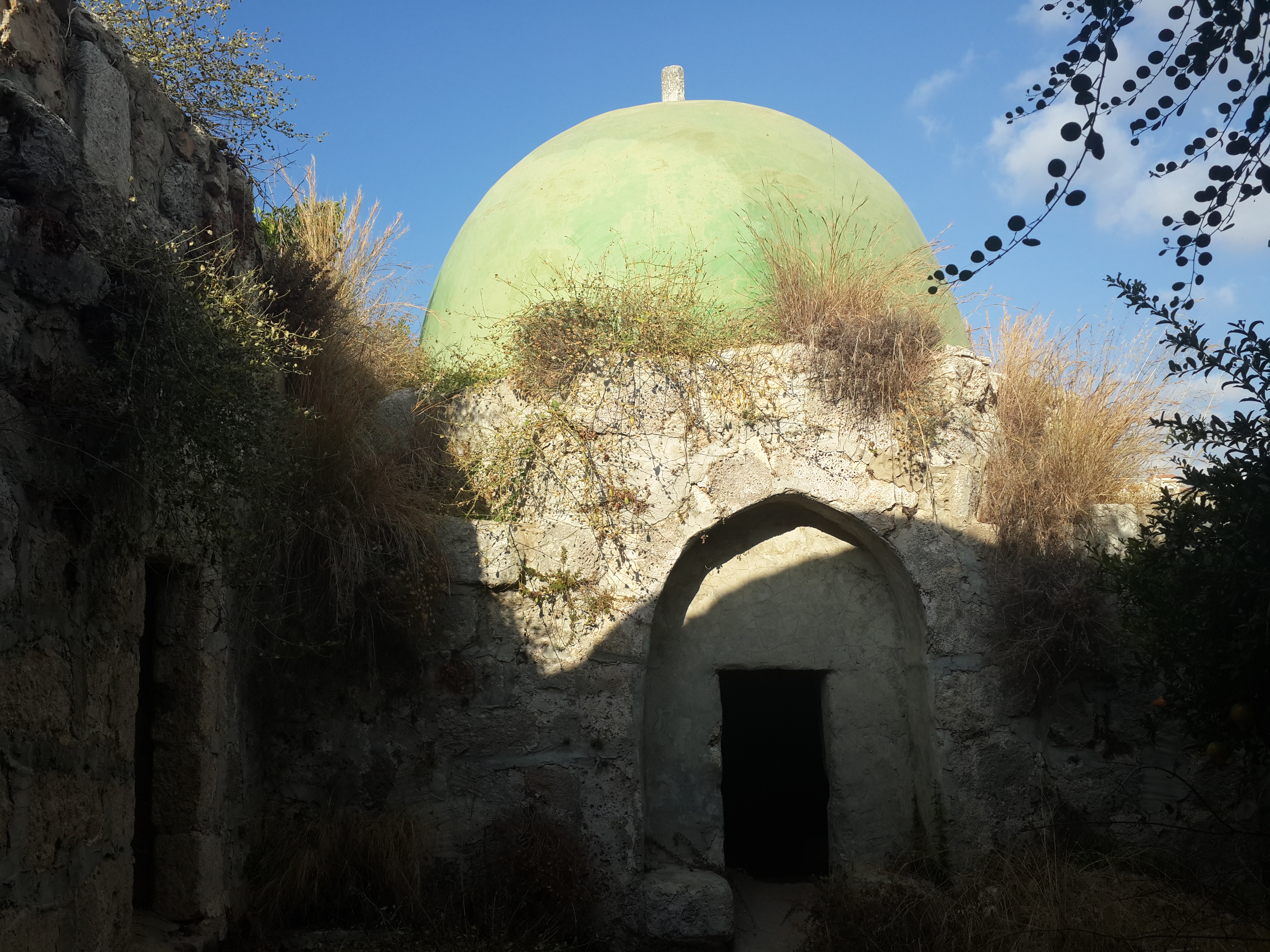
- Tomb of "Ali Al-Dajani"

- Location of Biddya within Palestine
- Coordinates: 32°06′51″N 35°04′39″E
- Palestine grid: 157/168
- State: State of Palestine
- Governorate: Salfit

Government
  - Type: Municipality
  - Head of Municipality: Ramadan Shatat
- Elevation: 359 m (1,178 ft)

Population (2017)
  - Total: 10,451
- Name meaning: "Bidieh", from personal name

Biddya (Arabic: بديا) is a Palestinian city in the Salfit Governorate, located 32 kilometers southwest of Nablus and half that distance from Salfit in the northern West Bank. According to the Palestinian Central Bureau of Statistics (PCBS), Biddya had a population of 10,451 in 2017. The town is governed by a municipal council of eleven members who each represent the prominent families of Biddya and select a mayor.

Biddya is situated on the western ridge of the central mountain range that runs north-south in the West Bank. The historical Nablus-Jerusalem road is nearby. A maqam (shrine) for a local holy man, Sheikh Hamdan is located in the town.

== Location ==
Biddya is located 10.27 kilometers (6.38 mi) north-west of Salfit. It is bordered by Qarawat Bani Hassan and Sarta to the east, Kafr ad Dik to the south, Sanniriya, Rafat, Az Zawiya and Mas-ha to the west, and Kafr Thulth to the north. It has an elevation of about 359 meters above sea level.

== History ==
=== Archaeology ===
Potsherds from the Iron Age II, Byzantine/Umayyad and Crusader/Ayyubid periods have been found here. Additionally found at this location is a rock-cut reservoir featuring descending steps.

The area was examined in 1873 by the PEF's Survey of Western Palestine (SWP), who gave the following description:

Rock-cut tombs exist here, principally rude caves. The rock is quarried in many places. South of the village is a birkeh (pool) about 30 feet by 20 feet, with a flight of 12 steps, leading down about 10 feet. It is made of rudely squared stones, about 1 foot to 1 1/2 feet in length, which are covered again with a well-made rubble almost resembling a tesselated pavement, and this again is covered with a soft white cement, containing large pieces of pottery and small stones. There is on each side of the pool (north and south) a semicircular stone buttress, 2 feet diameter, on a base about 4 feet; this perhaps indicates that the birkeh was roofed in. South-west of Bidieh is an ancient ruined watch-tower.

=== Ottoman era ===
In 1596, Biddya (also known as Beddia, Bedia, Bidya, Bedya, and Bidieh) appeared in Ottoman tax registers as being in the nahiya of Jabal Qubal in the liwa of Nablus. It had a population of 8 households and 1 bachelor, all Muslim. The villagers paid a fixed tax-rate of 33.3% on agricultural products, including wheat, barley, summer crops, olive trees, goats and beehives, in addition to occasional revenues; a total of 2,700 akçe. All of the revenue went to a Waqf.

In the 18th and 19th centuries, the village formed part of the highland region known as Jūrat ‘Amra or Bilād Jammā‘īn. Situated between Dayr Ghassāna in the south and the present Route 5 in the north, and between Majdal Yābā in the west and Jammā‘īn, Mardā and Kifl Ḥāris in the east, this area served, according to historian Roy Marom, "as a buffer zone between the political-economic-social units of the Jerusalem and the Nablus regions. On the political level, it suffered from instability due to the migration of the Bedouin tribes and the constant competition among local clans for the right to collect taxes on behalf of the Ottoman authorities."

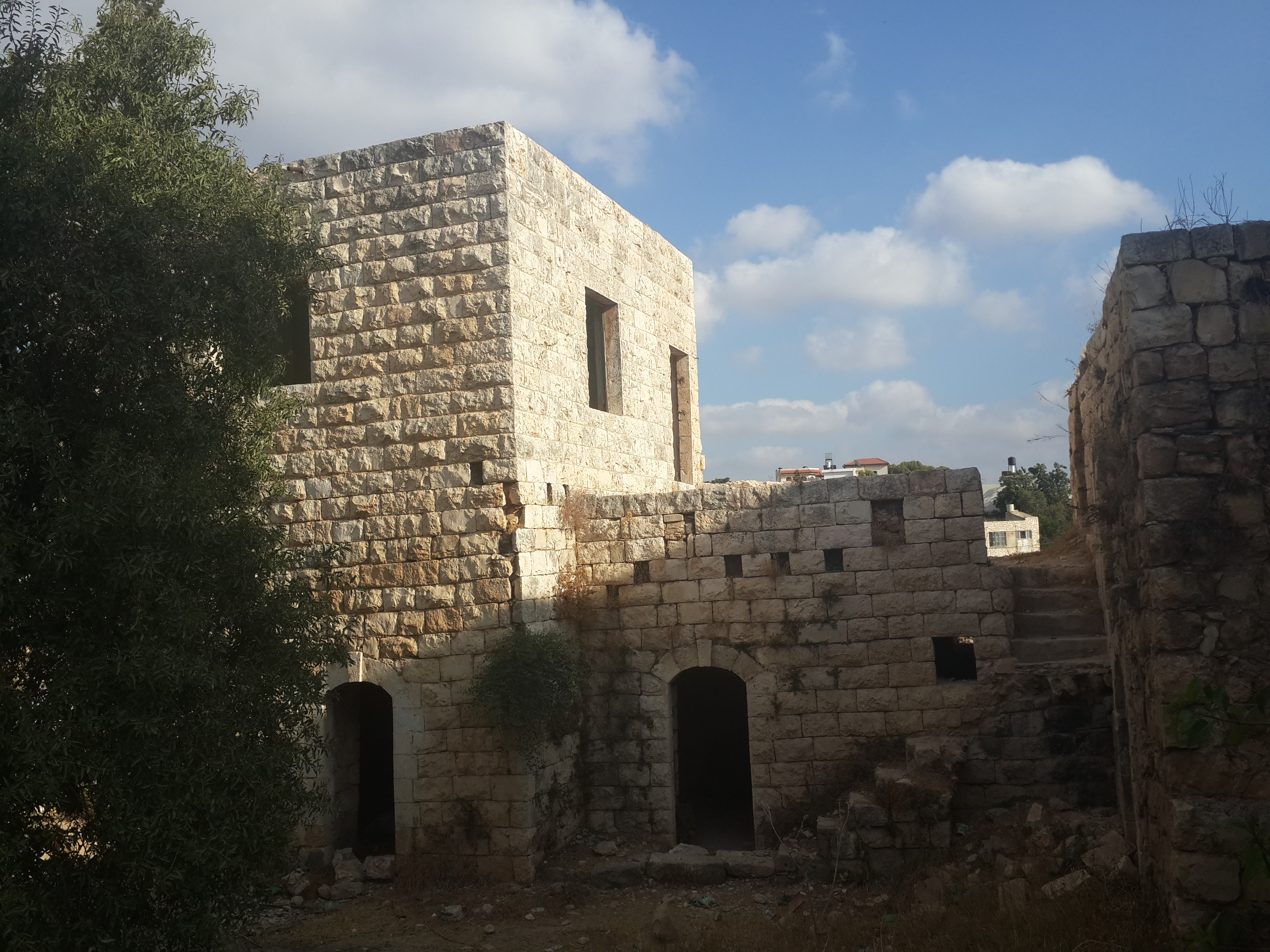
Buildings at the historical center of Biddya

In 1838, Edward Robinson noted it as a village, Bidia, in the Jurat Merda district, south of Nablus.

French explorer Victor Guérin passed by Beddia in 1870, and described it as a "mountain village", apparently of "some importance".

In 1870/1871 (1288 AH), an Ottoman census listed the village in the nahiya (sub-district) of Jamma'in al-Thani, subordinate to Nablus.

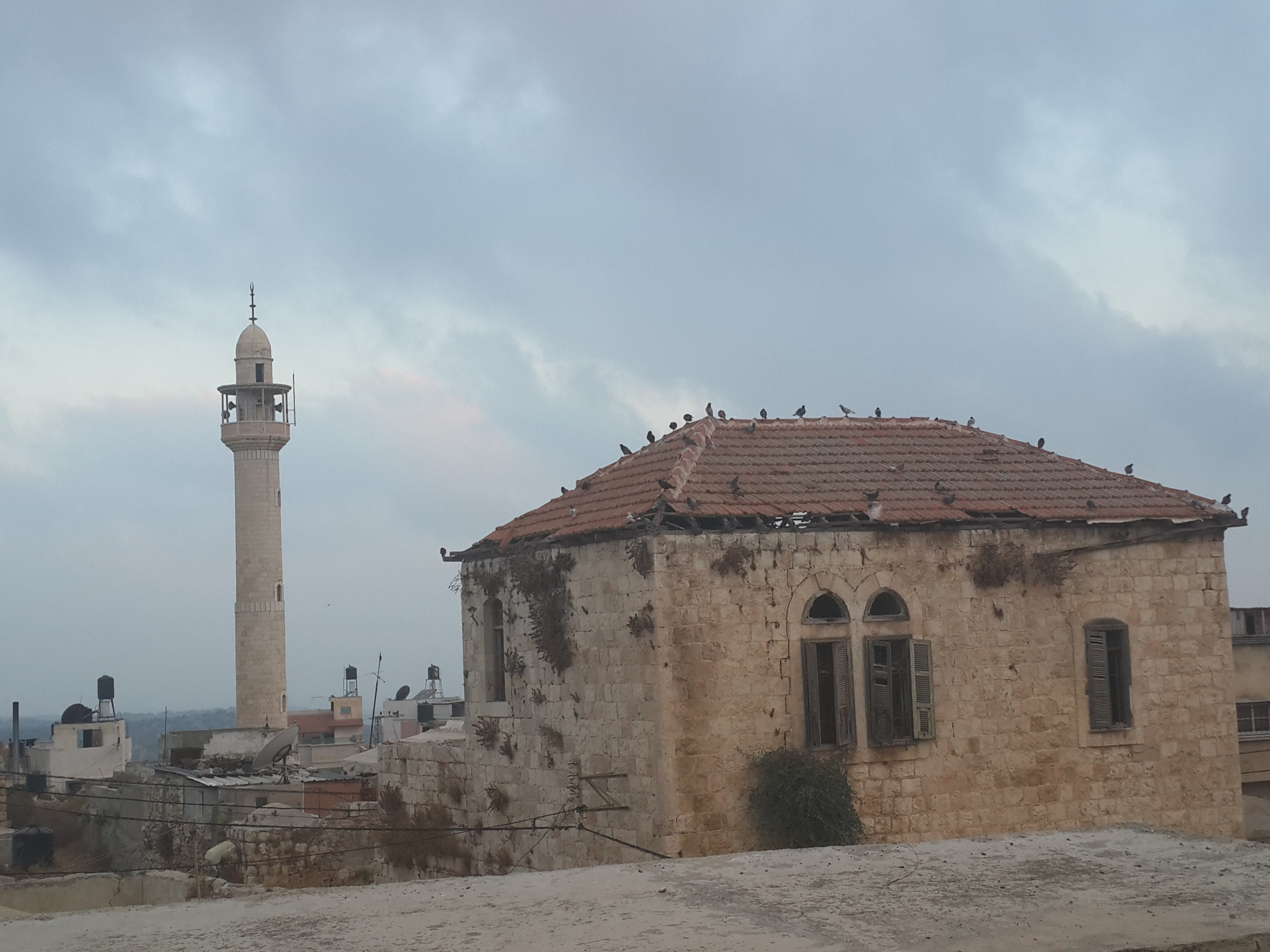
An old house and minaret in Biddya

In the 1882 "Survey of Western Palestine", Bidieh was described as "a village of moderate size, the houses principally of stone. It is surrounded with beautiful groves of very fine old olives. It is evidently an ancient site. The water supply is from rock-cut cisterns."

=== British Mandate era ===
In the 1922 census of Palestine, conducted by the British Mandate authorities, Biddya (called: Bedia) had a population of 792, all Muslims, while in the 1931 census Biddya (including Salita) had 245 occupied houses and a population of 1,026, still all Muslim.

In the 1945 statistics the population was 1,360, all Muslims, while the total land area was 13,466 dunams, according to an official land and population survey. Of this, 5,088 were allocated for plantations and irrigable land, 2,319 for cereals, while 47 dunams were classified as built-up areas.

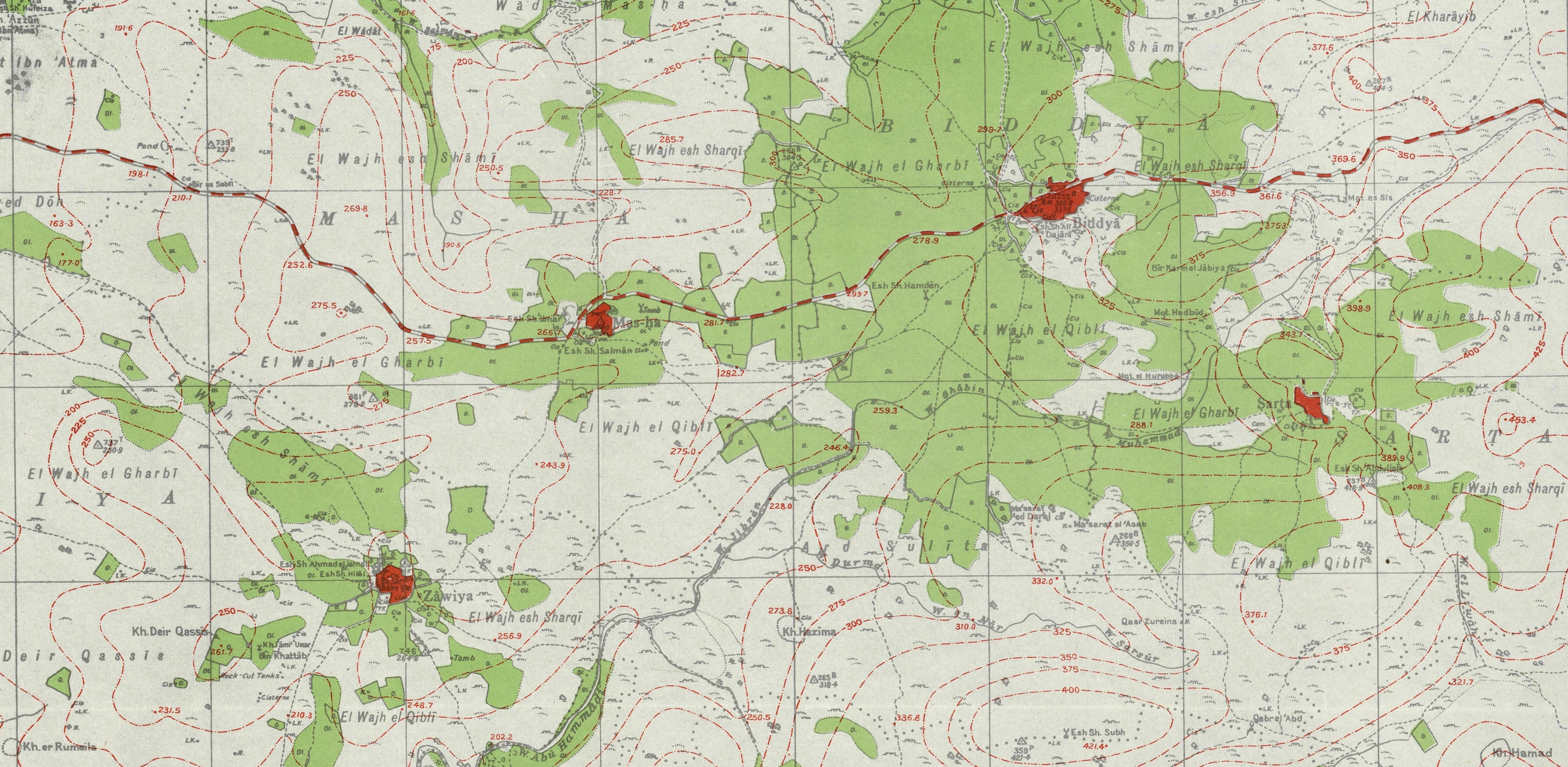
Biddya 1941 1:20,000

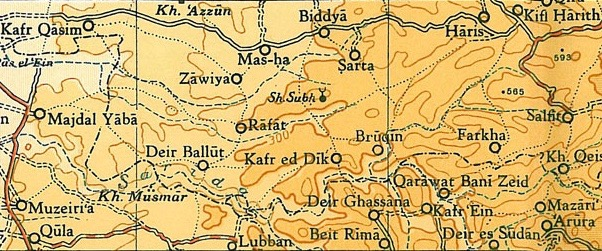
Biddya 1945 1:250,000

=== Jordanian era ===
In the wake of the 1948 Arab–Israeli War, and after the 1949 Armistice Agreements, Biddya came under Jordanian rule.

In 1961, the population of Biddya was 2,212.

=== Post-1967 ===
Since the Six-Day War in 1967, Biddya has been under Israeli occupation.

After the 1995 accords, 15.2% of village land was classified as Area B, the remaining 84.8% as Area C. The Israeli plans for the Israeli West Bank barrier will isolate and confiscate 1,943 dunums of the southern part of village land from Biddya.

By mid-2012, according to Palestinian General Election Commission, Biddya's (بديا) population was 8,951 (not including expatriates).

==== Economy ====
Biddya depends primarily on olive groves for olive oil and Nabulsi soap production – the town's main industries. The town mostly receives food products from subsistence farming or local grocery markets.

Before the beginning of the Second Intifada in the fall of 2000, many residents worked in neighboring towns and cities, especially in Nablus and Ramallah, as well as for Israeli employers. The main road traversing the village, Road No. 505 (previously part of the Trans-Samaria Highway), was lined with many stores which served thousands of Israeli shoppers who would frequent the town each week, including residents of the Israeli settlements passing through, as well as Israelis living in the Tel Aviv area who were looking for products at low prices. Unemployment was about 20%; however, since the Intifada that figure has risen to 78–90%. Besides farming, some inhabitants live off their savings and others receive aid from relatives abroad.

==== Public institutions ====
Biddya has five schools – two for each gender and a private school. Most high school graduates who attend college enroll in an-Najah National University in Nablus or Bir Zeit University in Bir Zeit. There are four mosques and three health clinics in the town.

=== See also ===
- Killing of Aisha al-Rabi

== Demography ==
=== Local origins ===
Residents of the village hail from several places, including Majdal, Dayr Tarif, and Deir Istiya.

== Bibliography ==
- Barron, J.B., ed. (1923). Palestine: Report and General Abstracts of the Census of 1922. Government of Palestine.
- Conder, C.R.; Kitchener, H.H. (1882). The Survey of Western Palestine: Memoirs of the Topography, Orography, Hydrography, and Archaeology. Vol. 2. London: Committee of the Palestine Exploration Fund.
- Finkelstein, I.; Lederman, Zvi, eds. (1997). Highlands of many cultures. Tel Aviv: Institute of Archaeology of Tel Aviv University Publications Section. ISBN 965-440-007-3.
- Government of Jordan, Department of Statistics (1964). First Census of Population and Housing. Volume I: Final Tables; General Characteristics of the Population (PDF).
- Government of Palestine, Department of Statistics (1945). Village Statistics, April, 1945.
- Guérin, V. (1875). Description Géographique, Historique et Archéologique de la Palestine. Vol 2:Samarie; pt. 2.
- Hadawi, S. (1970). Village Statistics of 1945: A Classification of Land and Area ownership in Palestine. Palestine Liberation Organization Research Center.
- Hütteroth, W.-D.; Abdulfattah, K. (1977). Historical Geography of Palestine, Transjordan and Southern Syria in the Late 16th Century. Erlanger Geographische Arbeiten, Sonderband 5. Erlangen, Germany: Vorstand der Fränkischen Geographischen Gesellschaft. ISBN 3-920405-41-2.
- Mills, E., ed. (1932). Census of Palestine 1931. Population of Villages, Towns and Administrative Areas. Jerusalem: Government of Palestine.
- Palmer, E.H. (1881). The Survey of Western Palestine: Arabic and English Name Lists Collected During the Survey by Lieutenants Conder and Kitchener, R. E. Transliterated and Explained by E.H. Palmer. Committee of the Palestine Exploration Fund.
- Robinson, E.; Smith, E. (1841). Biblical Researches in Palestine, Mount Sinai and Arabia Petraea: A Journal of Travels in the year 1838. Vol. 3. Boston: Crocker & Brewster.
- Sharon, M. (1999). Corpus Inscriptionum Arabicarum Palaestinae, B-C. Vol. 2. BRILL. ISBN 90-04-11083-6.
