= Azzun Atma =

'Azzun 'Atma
- Municipality type D (Village council)

Arabic transcription(s)
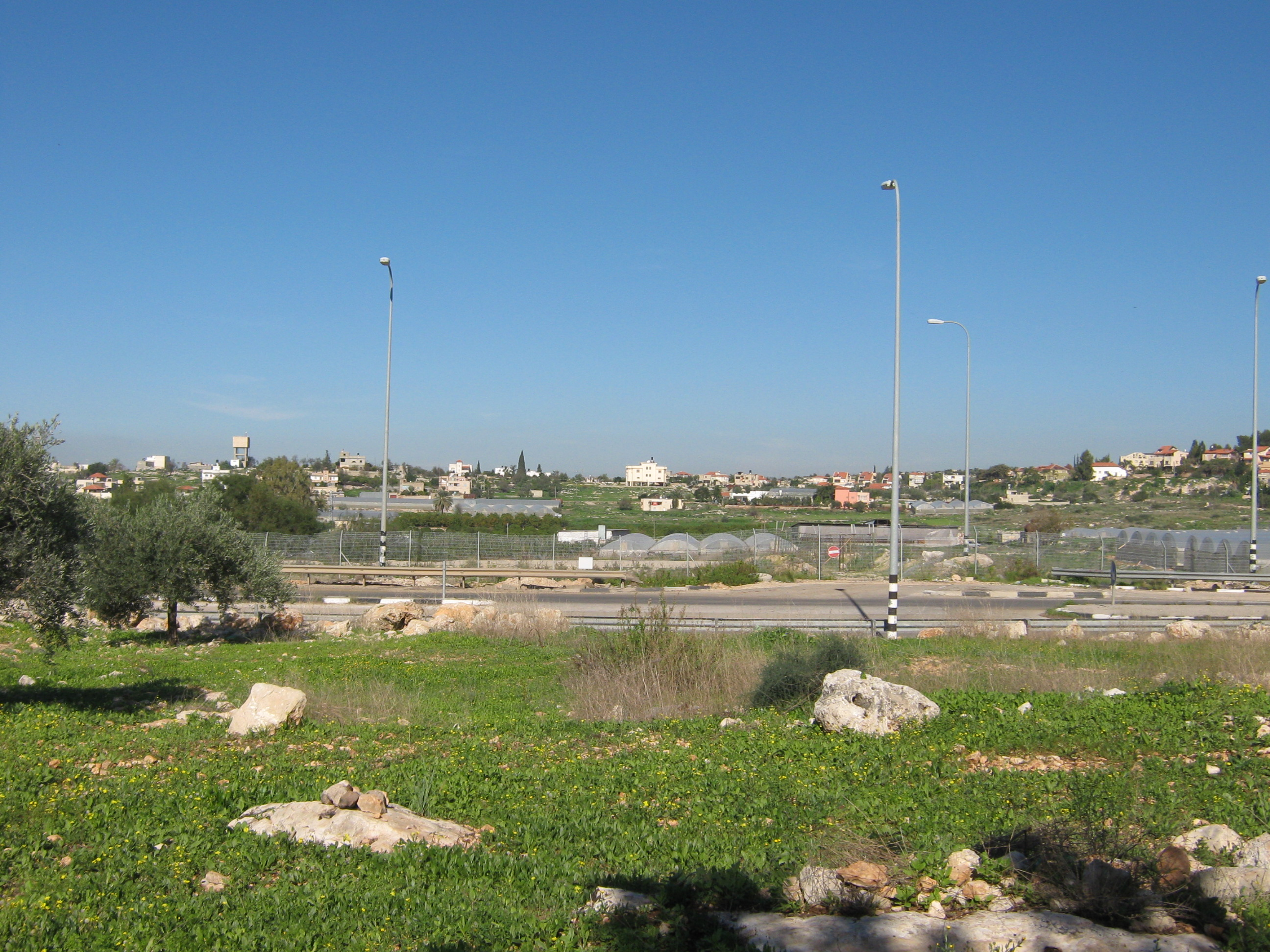
- Azzun Atma

- Location of 'Azzun 'Atma within Palestine
- Coordinates: 32°07′23″N 35°00′58″E
- Palestine grid: 152/169
- State: State of Palestine
- Governorate: Qalqilya

Government
  - Type: Village council

Population (2017)
  - Total: 2,068
- Name meaning: "The wild olive of Ibn 'Atmeh"

'Azzun 'Atma (Arabic: عزون عتمة) is a Palestinian village in the Qalqilya Governorate in the western West Bank, located 5 kilometers South-east of Qalqilya. According to the Palestinian Central Bureau of Statistics, 'Azzun 'Atma had a population of 2,068 inhabitants in 2017. 3.9% of the population of 'Azzun 'Atma were refugees in 1997. The healthcare facilities for 'Azzun 'Atma are designated as MOH level 2.

== Location ==
‘Azzun ‘Atma is located 8.82 km south of Qalqiliya. It is bordered by Mas-ha and Sha'arei Tikva to the east, Az Zawiya to the south, Oranit to the west, and Beit ‘Amin and ‘Izbat Salman to the north.

== History ==
Potsherds from the Iron Age II, Persian, Hellenistic, Byzantine, Byzantine/Umayyad, Crusader/Ayyubid and Mamluk eras have been found. Old stones have been reused in homes, and the mosque is possibly an old church.

=== Ottoman era ===
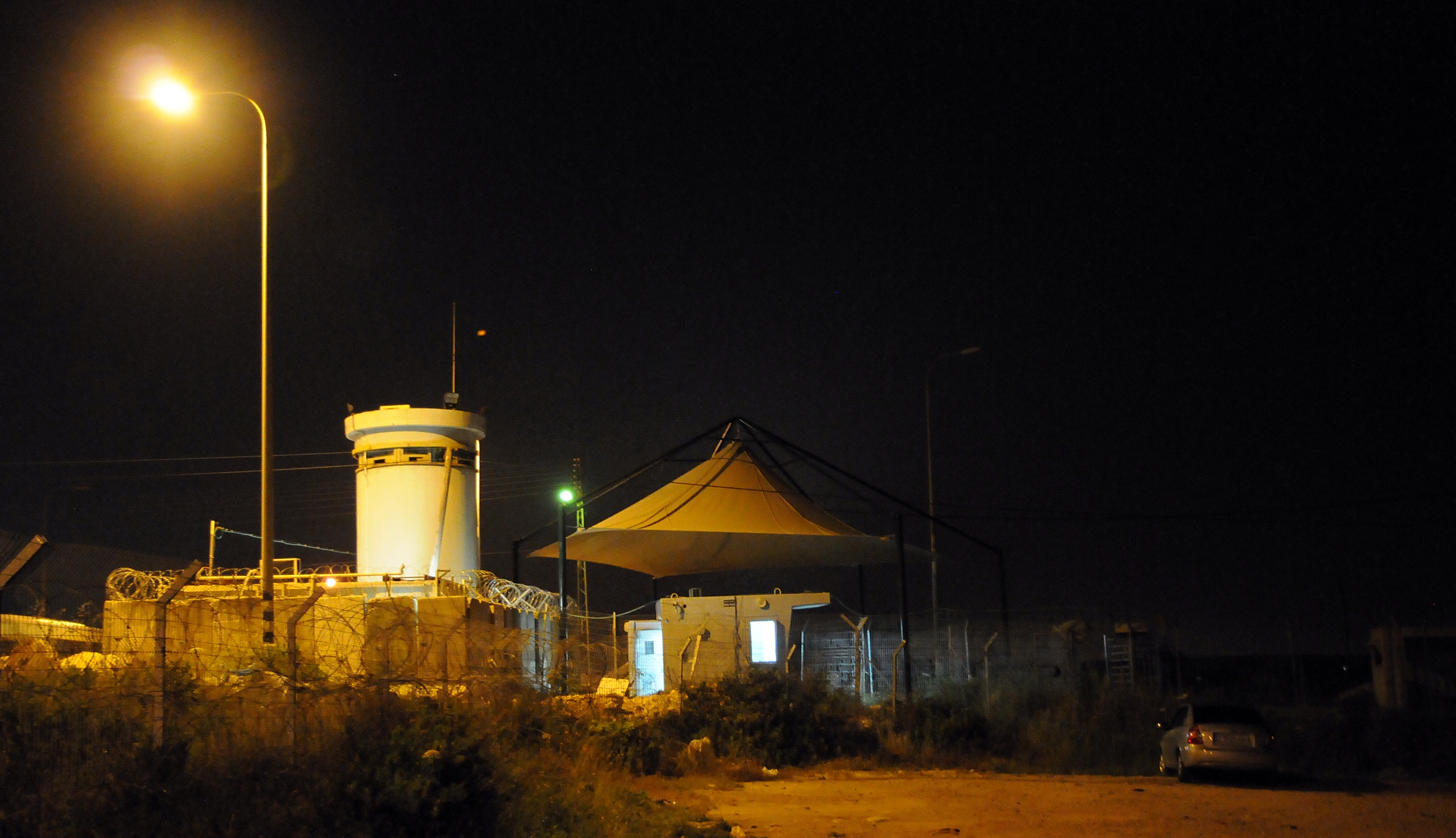
Israeli military checkpoint in Azun Atma.

The place appeared in 1596 Ottoman tax registers as 'Azzun, being in the Nahiya of Jabal Qubal of the Liwa of Nablus. It had a population of 29 households and 2 bachelors, all Muslim. The villagers paid a fixed tax rate of 33,3%, on wheat, barley, summer crops, olives, goats and beehives; a total of 4,200 akçe. Potsherds from the early Ottoman era have also been found here.

The village was abanonded in the 17th century due to internal conflicts.

When the French explorer Victor Guérin visited the place in 1870 it was described it as a large Arab village, then deserted. Many small, square houses were still partly standing, and near the mosque he noticed old columns and large stone from older buildings. Old fig trees and beautiful mimosa were scattered through the ruins. In the PEF's Survey of Western Palestine (1882), it is also described as a "ruined village".

=== British Mandate era ===
Azzun Atma was resettled in the early 20th century by people from Sanniriya. In 1931, it was recorded as a khirbet of Sanniriya.

=== Jordanian Era ===
In the wake of the 1948 Arab–Israeli War, and after the 1949 Armistice Agreements, Azzun Atma came under Jordanian rule.

=== Post-1967 ===
Since the Six-Day War in 1967, Azzun Atma has been under Israeli occupation.

After the 1995 accords, about 3.8% of village land was classified as Area B, the remaining 96.2% as Area C. Israel has confiscated 2,689 dunams of village land in order to construct three Israeli settlements of Sha'are Tikva, Oranit and Zamarot (Zamarot becoming part of Oranit), in addition to land for the Israeli West Bank wall, which almost entirely surrounds Azzun Atma, and which also isolate the village from much of its remaining land behind the wall.

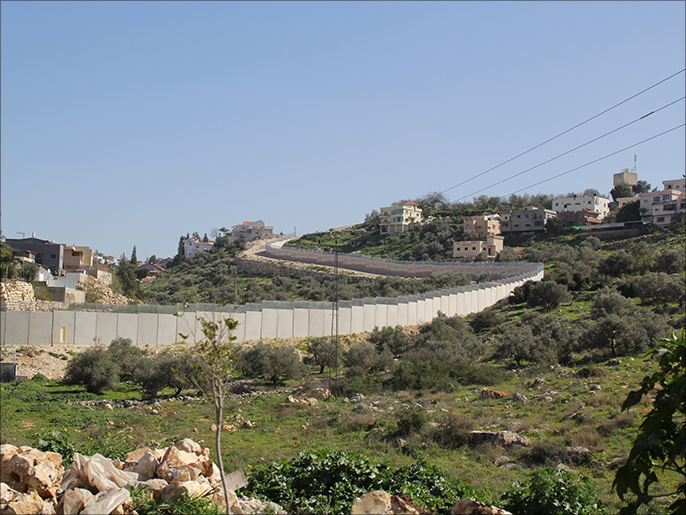
The Palestinian village of Azzun Atma and the Israeli settlement of Sha'arei Tikva, separated by Israeli wall, 2015

== See also ==
- Sanniriya

== Bibliography ==
- Conder, C.R.; Kitchener, H.H. (1881). The Survey of Western Palestine: Memoirs of the Topography, Orography, Hydrography, and Archaeology. Vol. 2. London: Committee of the Palestine Exploration Fund.
- Dauphin, C. (1998). La Palestine byzantine, Peuplement et Populations. BAR International Series 726 (in French). Vol. III : Catalogue. Oxford: Archeopress. ISBN 0-860549-05-4.
- Finkelstein, I.; Lederman, Zvi, eds. (1997). Highlands of many cultures. Tel Aviv: Institute of Archaeology of Tel Aviv University Publications Section. ISBN 965-440-007-3.
- Guérin, V. (1875). Description Géographique Historique et Archéologique de la Palestine (in French). Vol. 2: Samarie, pt. 2. Paris: L'Imprimerie Nationale.
- Hütteroth, W.-D.; Abdulfattah, K. (1977). Historical Geography of Palestine, Transjordan and Southern Syria in the Late 16th Century. Erlanger Geographische Arbeiten, Sonderband 5. Erlangen, Germany: Vorstand der Fränkischen Geographischen Gesellschaft. ISBN 3-920405-41-2.
- Palmer, E.H. (1881). The Survey of Western Palestine: Arabic and English Name Lists Collected During the Survey by Lieutenants Conder and Kitchener, R. E. Transliterated and Explained by E.H. Palmer. Committee of the Palestine Exploration Fund.
