= Elkana =

Israeli settlement in the West Bank

Elkana: אֶלְקָנָה; القناة
- Local council (from 1981)

Hebrew transcription(s)
  - ISO 259: ʔelqana
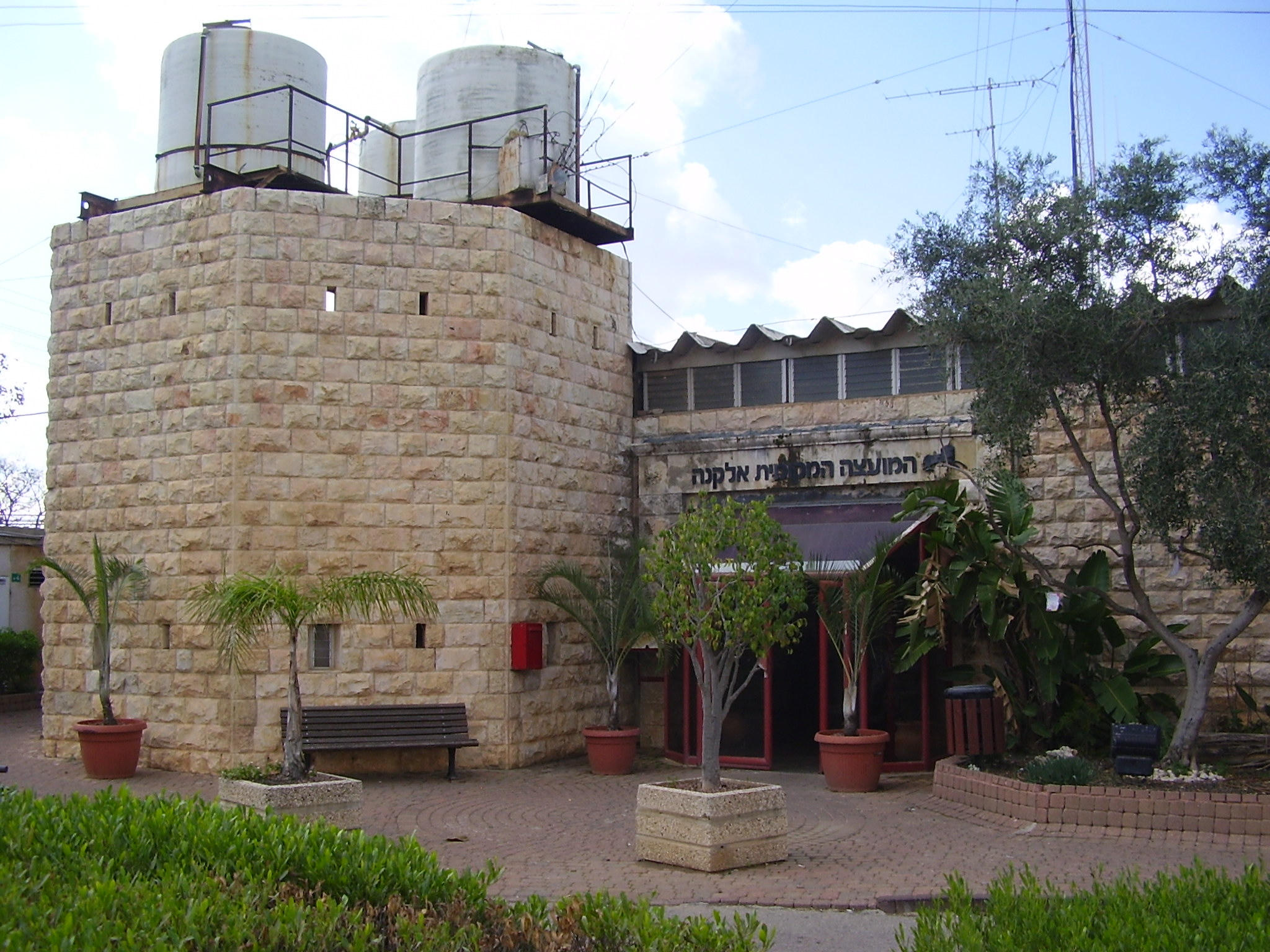

- Location within the Northern West Bank
- Coordinates: 32°6′35.99″N 35°2′3.48″E
- Region: West Bank
- District: Judea and Samaria Area
- Founded: 1977

Government
  - Head of Municipality: Asaf Mintzer

Area
  - Total: 1,148 dunams (1.148 km^{2}; 0.443 sq mi)

Population (2024)
  - Total: 4,493
  - Density: 3,914/km^{2} (10,140/sq mi)
- Name meaning: Named after Elkanah

Elkana or Elqana (Hebrew: אֶלְקָנָה) is an Israeli settlement and local council in the north-western Samarian hills in the West Bank, located 3.1 km to the east of the Green Line and the city of Rosh HaAyin. It was founded in 1977 by a group from Gush Emunim of religious and non-religious Jews, and by July 2020 it had a population of 3858.

The international community considers Israeli settlements in the West Bank illegal under international law, but the Israeli government disputes this.

== History ==
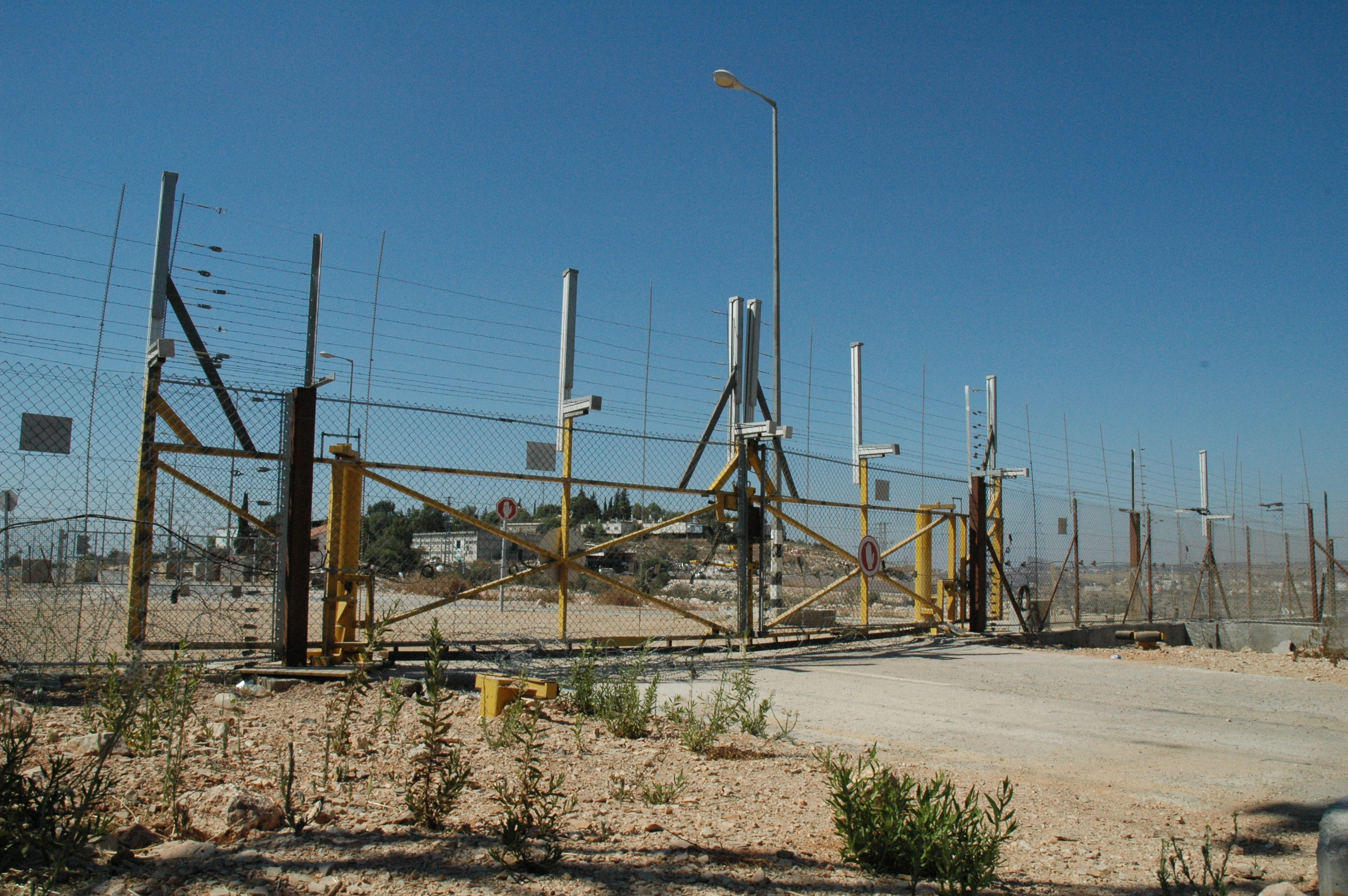
The Israeli barrier separating the Palestinian village of Mas-ha from Elkana

According to ARIJ, Israel confiscated 1,626 dunams of land from the Palestinian village of Mas-ha in 1977 in order to construct Elkana.

Elkana was established as one of the earliest settlements after 64 Knesset members signed a bill to allow the use of state land in the area for construction. On 1 May 1977, fifteen men climbed the hill and started preparing the area for families for the official day on 10 May. Amongst the first families to move to the settlement was that of the former Chief of Staff Shaul Mofaz ten days later. Elkana became the fourth community to be established by the Seventeenth government of Israel headed by Yitzhak Rabin, following the Kadum outpost, Ofra, and Ma'ale Adumim. A few months later, forty families had moved into prefabricated home's called 'ashkubiot' and after two years, over a hundred families lived in the village.

In 1983, the first permanent structures were built as the village was divided into different neighbourhoods named after the number of homes planned in each one: 220, 165, 80, and 34 (also called Bnai Elkana). More recently, two newer neighbourhoods have been built; One on the northern side of the town as well as another smaller one to the west.

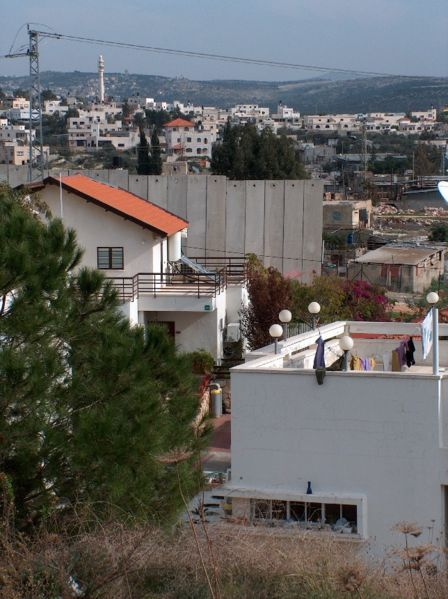
In the foreground, the Israeli settlement of Elkana, built adjacent to Mas-ha. Behind the Israeli wall, the village of Masha, November 2006

In November 2013 Israel published plans for 283 new homes to be built in Elkana. In January 2014 they received permission for the homes, and on 5 September 2014 announced tenders for the units.

The town was named after the nearby Nahal Qana and Elkanah, father of Samuel (1 Samuel 1:1), who is believed to have lived in the area. Virtually all of the town's residents are religious of a primarily national religious orientation.

The Trans-Samarian Highway previously cut through the town until 2000 when the road, which now skirts to the south, was upgraded.

== Voting Patterns ==
In the 2026 election, 73 percent of voters in Elkana voted for the parties of the right-wing coalition led by Benjamin Netanyahu, while 12 percent voted for the parties of the center-left coalition led by Gadi Eisenkot and 0.1 percent voted for the Arab parties. An additional 3.3 percent voted for the Reservists, and 10.5 percent voted for Amcha Yisrael. Voter turnout increased 13 percent from the 2022 election.

== Notable residents ==
- Nissan Slomiansky (born 1946), Former Member of the Knesset and first mayor of Elkana
- Shaul Yahalom (born 1947), Former Member of the Knesset and Transport minister

== See also ==
- Mas-ha
