= Jayyusi family =

Palestinian business and political clan

Al-Jayyusi (Arabic: الجیوسي; also spelled Jayousi, Jayossi, Jayyousi, or Juyushi) is a prominent Palestinian business and political clan whose members acted as rulers, local lords, army generals and tax collectors since the 11th century. They were the traditional leaders of the Bani Sa'b subdistrict (nahiya), which included their throne villages of Kur and Kafr Sur; Jayyus the village named after the patronymic of the family founder, Fatimid Vizier and Governor of Damascus (Badr al-Din al-Jamali) who was known by his military title Amīr al-Juyūsh (Arabic: أمير الجيوش; General of the Armies) where the name 'Juyush-i' was designated to his property, lands and all decedents in Egypt and Palestine. Other Palestinian villages that were considered within the Jayyusi clan's stronghold include Qalqilya, Tayibe, Jinsafut, Kafr Zibad and Kafr Jammal.

== History ==
The Jayyusi clan had served as the local rulers of the Bani Sa'b subdistrict (nahiya) beginning at the 11th century during the Fatimid dynasty and 15th century Burji Mamluk rule in Palestine. When the area came under Ottoman rule, the clan continued to rule and was commissioned by the Ottoman authorities to protect the part of the Cairo-Damascus highway that ran between Majdal Yaba and Qaqun. As a testament to the continuing influence of the Jayyusi clan, Bani Sa'b was the only Mamluk-era subdistrict of Jabal Nablus to not be renamed.

In 1766, the Nablus-based Tuqan family under Mustafa Beik, managed to gain appointment as the chief of Bani Sa'b, temporarily sidelining the Jayyusi clan. This seizure of power was the first time an urban notable family gained direct control over a rural subdistrict and the move put the Tuqan in conflict with Jayyusi allies, the Sanur-based Jarrar family and the autonomous ruler of Galilee, Zahir al-Umar. The latter expelled the Tuqans from Bani Sa'b in 1771.

According to the Palestinian historian Mustafa al-Dabbagh in his book Our Land Palestine, the Jayyusi clan took part in the Peasants' Revolt, along with most of Palestine's prominent clans, against Ibrahim Pasha, the ruler of the Levant when he imposed new taxes and conscription orders on the local population.

== Throne village ==
The Jayyusi clan built and inhabited the throne village of Kur since the 11th century AD during the Fatimid Dynasty by the family founder Badr al-Din al-Jamali and his Acre born son Al-Afdal Shahanshah. In modern history, after the creation of State of Israel in 1948, one third of the inhabitants were forced out of their homes by the Israeli Army following the Six-Day War. Members of the clan who were able to remain, are today the only inhabitants of the throne village of Kur (located in the middle of Nablus, Tulkarem and Qalqilia district triangle, which was the former administrative center of the Bani Sa'b district.) Today, 29 historic buildings remain standing in the village.

== Notable personalities ==
- Abu Odeh al-Jayyusi: Palestinian lord and leader who led the successful resistance movement in Palestine against Napoleon Bonaparte during the French Campaign in Egypt and Syria in the areas of Nablus Tulkarm and north east Jaffa.
- Rashid al-Jayyusi: Lawyer and intellectual who was deported by the occupying British forces during Mandate Palestine for his opinions on the British Empire.
- Hashim al-Jayyousi: Held the following positions in Jordan, Minister of Trade and Commerce, Minister of Agriculture, Minister of Transport, Minister of Building and Construction, Minister of Interior and a Jordanian Senator.
- Salma Khadra Jayyusi: Poet, translator, anthologist, analyst and instructor of Arabic literature
- Odeh Jayyusi: Academic and currently the regional director for IUCN (the World Conservation Union).
- Wissam al-Jayyusi: Palestinian philanthropist who drove on his motorbike through the Middle East, Asia and Europe to fundraise money for handicapped children in Gaza

== Bibliography ==
- Amiry, S. (2003). Throne Village Architecture. رواق، مركز المعمار الشعبي،. ISBN 0-88728-293-8.
- Becker, C.H. (1960). "Badr al-Jamālī". In Gibb, H. A. R.; Kramers, J. H.; Lévi-Provençal, E.; Schacht, J.; Lewis, B. & Pellat, Ch. (eds.). The Encyclopaedia of Islam, Second Edition. Volume I: A–B. Leiden: E. J. Brill. pp. 869–870. OCLC 495469456.
- Dadoyan, S.B. (2013). The Armenians in the Medieval Islamic World: Armenian Realpolitik in the Islamic World and Diverging Paradigms: Case of Cilicia Eleventh to Fourteenth Centuries. Transaction Publishers. ISBN 978-1-4128-4577-9.
- Doumani, B. (1995). Rediscovering Palestine: Merchants and Peasants in Jabal Nablus, 1700-1900. University of California Press. ISBN 9780520203709.
- Macalister, R.A.S.; Masterman, E. W. G. (1905). "Occasional Papers on the Modern inhabitants of Palestine, part I & part II". Quarterly Statement - Palestine Exploration Fund. 37: 343–356. doi:10.1179/peq.1905.37.4.343. S2CID 161632875.
- Shahin, Mariam (2007). Palestine A Guide. Chastleton Travel. ISBN 978-1-905214-51-8.
- al-Imad, Leila S. (1990). The Fatimid Vizierate (979-1172). Berlin: Klaus Schwarz Verlag. ISBN 3-922968-82-1., pp. 96–109
