= Leshem (Israeli settlement) =

Leshem: לֶשֶם (Hebrew)
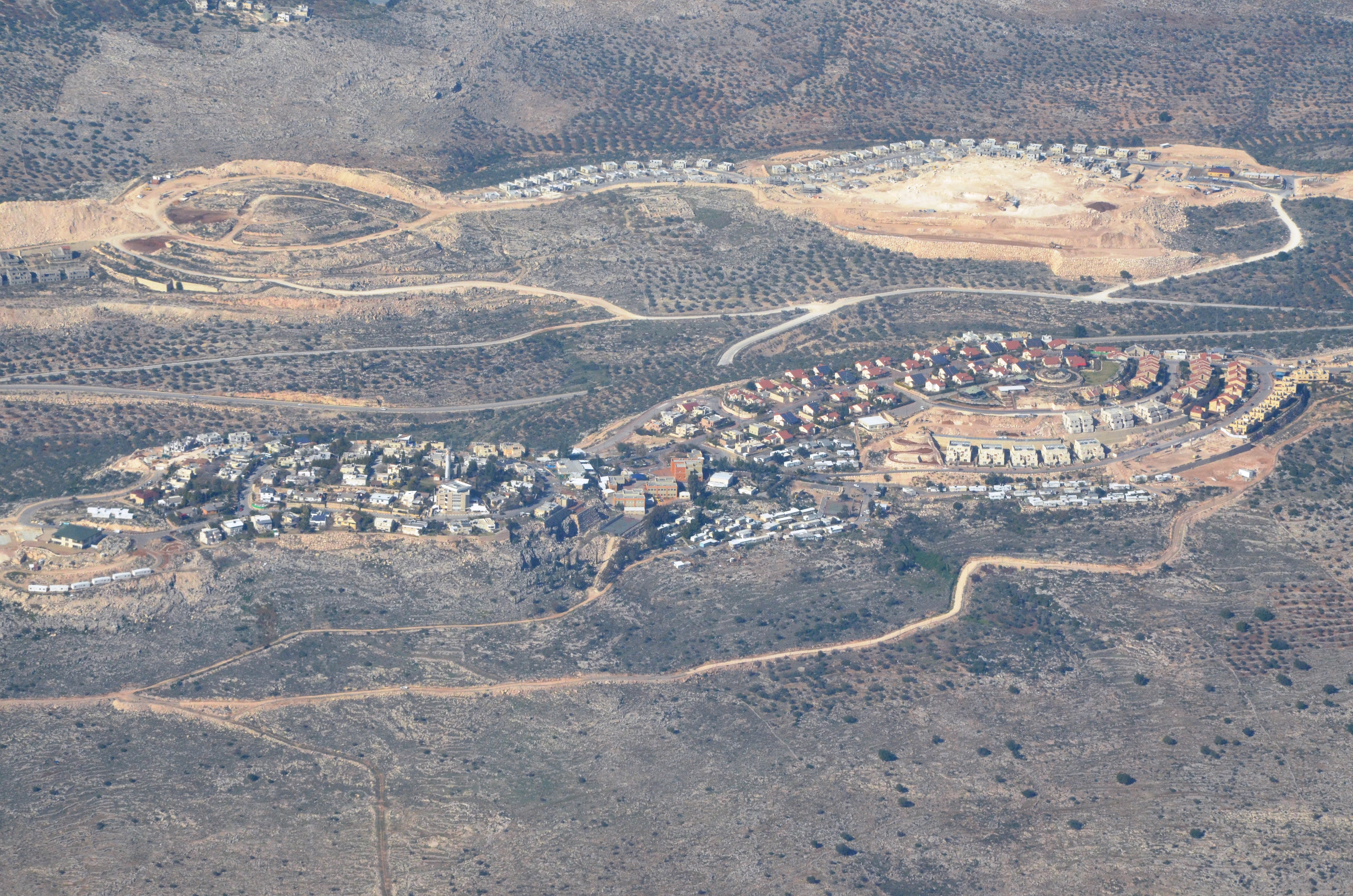
- Leshem's Overview
- Etymology: Gem Stone
- Location within the Central West Bank
- Coordinates: 32°4′11″N 35°3′4″E
- Country: Palestine
- District: Judea and Samaria Area
- Council: Shomron
- Region: West Bank
- Affiliation: Hapoel HaMizrachi
- Founded: 2013
- Website: http://myleshem.co.il

Leshem (Hebrew: לֶשֶם) is an Israeli settlement in the West Bank. It is located on Route 446, about 13 km (8 miles) west of the Palestinian city of Salfit and about 37 km (23 miles) northwest of Jerusalem, in the Palestinian side of the Israeli West Bank barrier. Leshem is neighbored by the Israeli settlements of Alei Zahav, Peduel, Bruchin, Beit Aryeh-Ofarim, the archeological site of Deir Samaan, and the Palestinian villages Rafat, Kafr ad-Dik, and Deir Ballut.

Leshem settlement rises to a height of 360 meters (1181.1 feet) above sea level and is stretched across two hills, the eastern hill and the western hill which altogether cover about 497 dunam (122.811 acres).

The international community considers Israeli settlements in the West Bank illegal under international law, but the Israeli government disputes this.

== History ==
In 1999, Lubavitcher Chassidim expressed their interest in putting down roots in what is known today as the western hill of Leshem, and shortly after building permits had been acquired, construction of a new settlement started. The settlement was named Adanim.

In 2020, Leshem was one of several Israeli settlement which dumped its untreated sewage onto Deir Ballut land.

In March 2025, the security cabinet approved a decision to legalize Leshem as an independent settlement separate from Alei Zahav.
