= Deir Ballut =

- Municipality type D (Village council)

Arabic transcription(s)
  - Arabic: دير بلّوط
  - Latin: Dayr Ballout (official); Deir al-Ballut (unofficial)
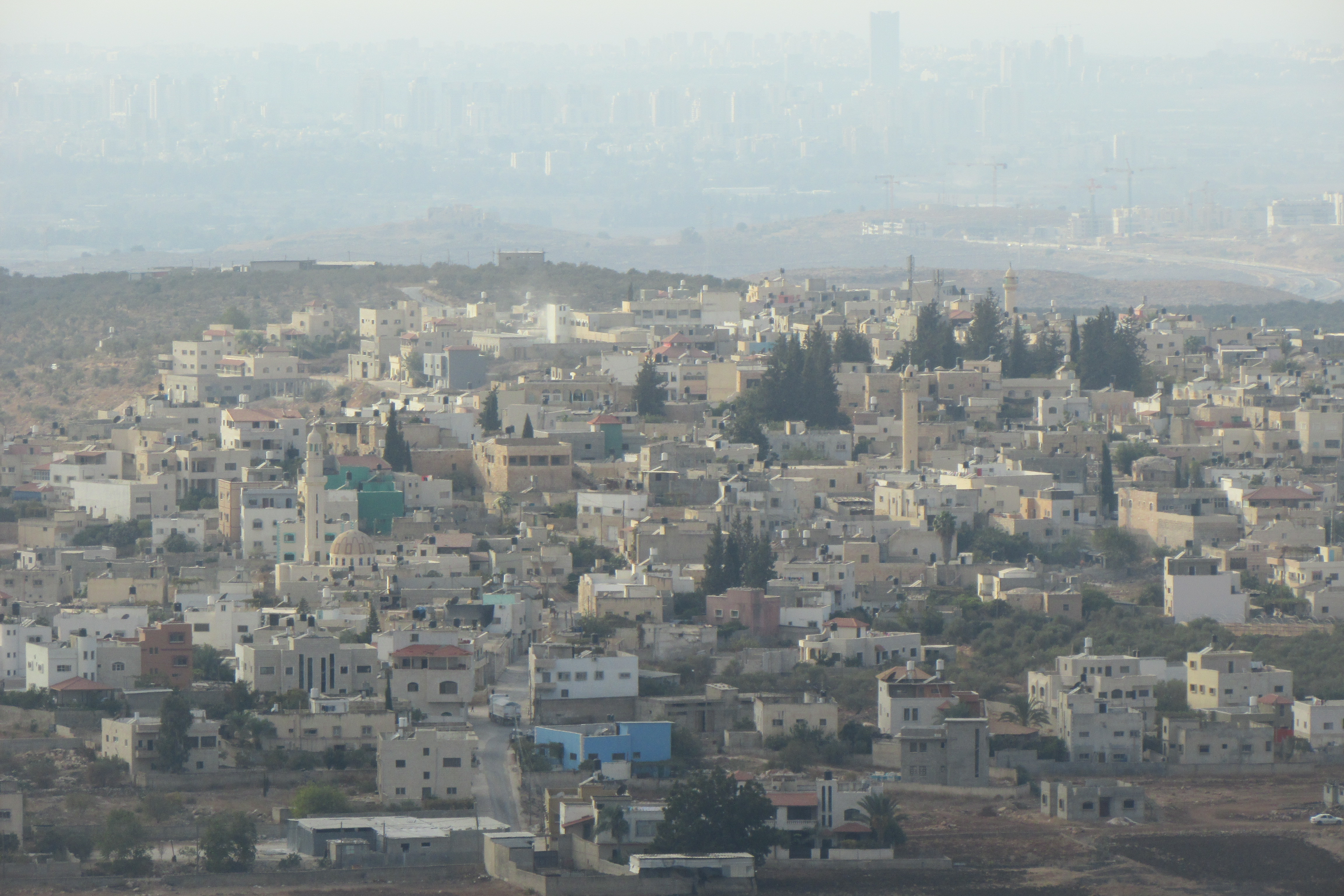
- Deir Ballut

- Location of Deir Ballut within Palestine Location of Deir Ballut within the West Bank
- Coordinates: 32°03′55″N 35°01′30″E
- Palestine grid: 152/163
- State: State of Palestine
- Governorate: Salfit

Government
  - Type: Village council
- Elevation: 236 m (774 ft)

Population (2017)
  - Total: 3,873
- Name meaning: "Monastery (or Convent) of the Oak"

Deir Ballut (Arabic: دير بلّوط) is a Palestinian town in the Salfit Governorate in the northern West Bank, 41 kilometers (25 mi) south west of Nablus. According to the Palestinian Central Bureau of Statistics, it had a population of 3,873 in 2017.

== Location ==
Deir Ballut is 15 kilometers (9.3 mi) west of Salfit. It is bordered by Kafr ad Dik to its east, Al Lubban al Gharbi to the south, Kafr Qasem to the west, and Rafat to the north.

== History ==
Deir Ballut was inhabited during Mamluk rule in Palestine but was emptied of its residents in the 16th century. It was later resettled by people from Kafr ad-Dik.

Earlier remains, including sherds from the Iron Age, Roman, Byzantine, Umayyad/Abbasid and Crusader/Ayyubid eras have been found here.

The "great valley" of Wadi Deir Ballut was identified by Charles William Wilson (1836–1905) as the boundary between Judaea and Samaria, as defined by first-century historian Josephus.

Arab geographer Yaqut al-Hamawi records in 1226 that "Deir al-Ballut was a village of district around ar-Ramla."

=== Ottoman era ===
In the 18th and 19th centuries, Deir Ballut belonged to the highland region known as Jūrat ‘Amra or Bilād Jammā‘īn. Situated between Dayr Ghassāna in the south and the present Route 5 in the north, and between Majdal Yābā in the west and Jammā‘īn, Mardā and Kifl Ḥāris in the east, this area served, according to historian Roy Marom, "as a buffer zone between the political-economic-social units of the Jerusalem and the Nablus regions. On the political level, it suffered from instability due to the migration of the Bedouin tribes and the constant competition among local clans for the right to collect taxes on behalf of the Ottoman authorities."

In 1838, it was noted as a Muslim village, Deir Balut, in Jurat Merda, south of Nablus.

In 1870 Victor Guérin found it to be a village of one hundred and fifty people. However, judging by the extent of the ruins that covered the hill where it stood, Guérin thought it had once been a large city. Most houses were built with large stones.

In 1882 the PEF's Survey of Western Palestine (SWP) described it as "a small village, partly ruinous, but evidently once a place of greater importance, with rock-cut tombs. The huts are principally of stone. The water supply is from wells." To the west of the village are rock-tombs, from a Christian age.

=== WWI and British Mandate era ===
During World War I, Deir Ballut was the site of a minor engagement between Turkish and British troops on March 12, 1918.

In the 1922 census of Palestine Deir Ballut had a population of 384 inhabitants, all Muslim, rising to 532 in the 1931 census, still all Muslim, in a total of 91 houses.

In the 1945 statistics the population was 720, all Muslim while the total land area was 14,789 dunams, according to an official land and population survey. Of this, 508 dunams were for plantations and irrigable land, 3,488 for cereals, while 63 dunams were classified as built-up (urban) areas.

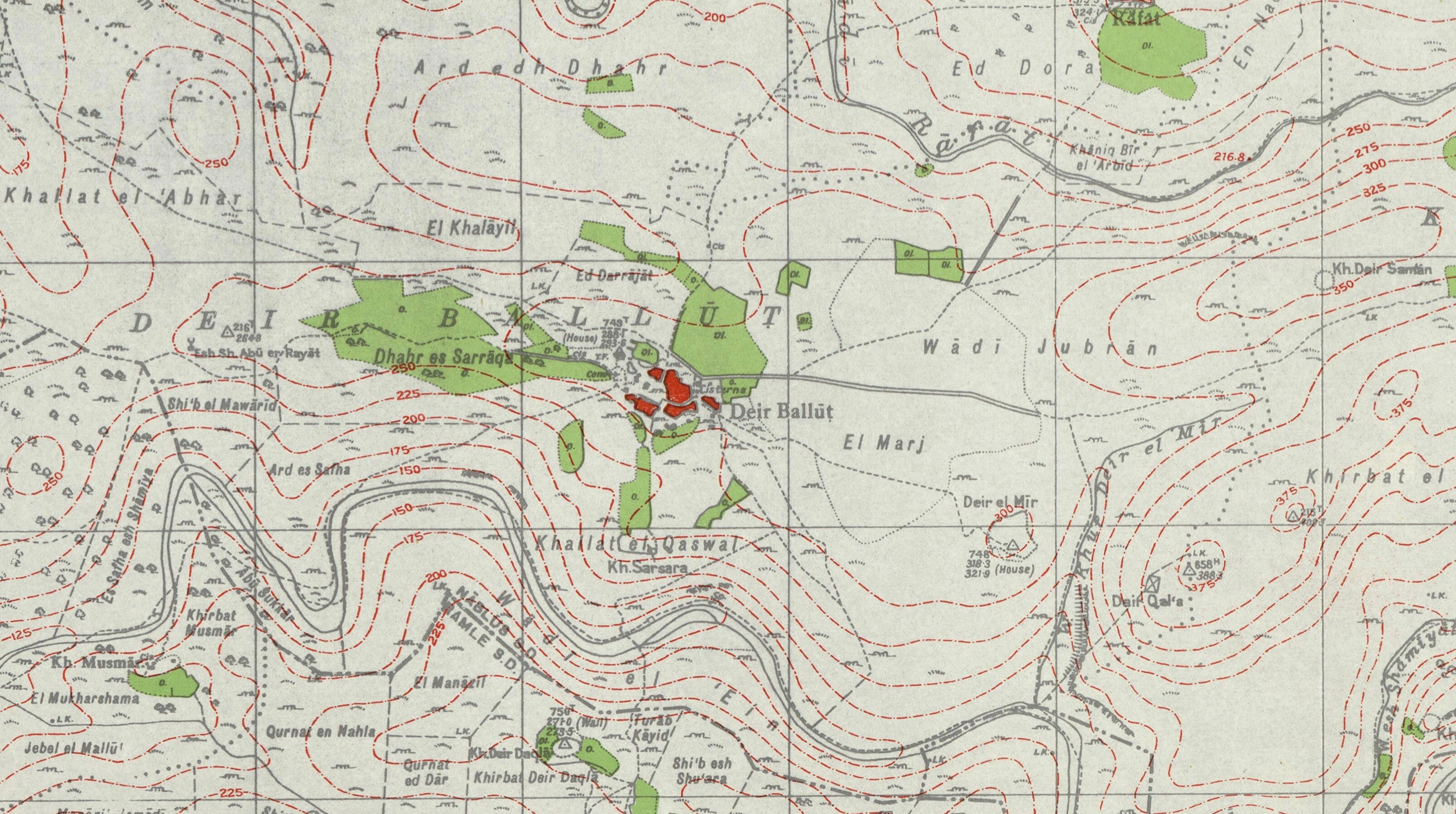
Deir Ballut 1943 1:20,000

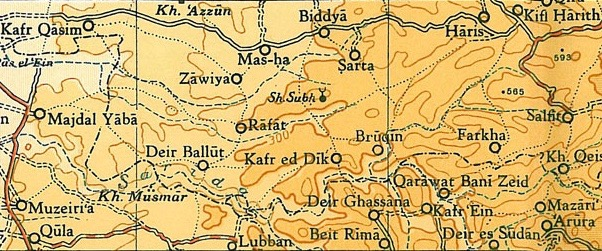
Deir Ballut 1945 1:250,000

=== Jordanian era ===
In the wake of the 1948 Arab–Israeli War, and after the 1949 Armistice Agreements, Deir Ballut came under Jordanian rule.

In 1961, the population was 1,087.

=== Post-1967 ===
Since the Six-Day War in 1967, Deir Ballut has been under Israeli occupation.

After the 1995 accords, 5.2% of village land was classified as Area B, the remaining 94.8% as Area C. Israel has confiscated 171 dunums of village land in for the Israeli settlements of Peduel and Alei Zahav.

By 2020, there were reports about untreated sewage from the nearby Israeli settlements of Leshem, Peduel and Beit Aryeh-Ofarim being dumped on Deir Ballut land.

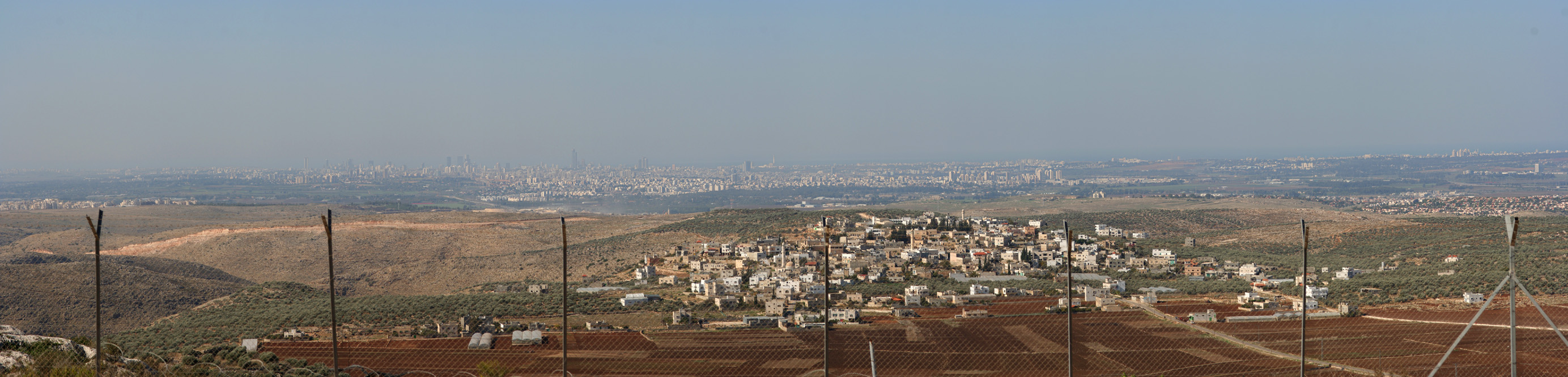
View of Deir Ballut (foreground) from Peduel

In January 2021 the Israeli military authority had some 3,000 olive trees planted by the villagers uprooted. Many has been planted as long as 15 years earlier. The destruction, on the grounds that the area in question was, in Israeli law, Israeli state property, took place six days after a legal appeal had been made against the order. The authorities then stated that the uprooting occurred before knowledge of the filed appeal papers came to their notice.

== See also ==
- Battle of Tell 'Asur
- John Macdonald Aiken (paintings from Deir Ballut during WWI)

== Bibliography ==
- Barron, J.B., ed. (1923). Palestine: Report and General Abstracts of the Census of 1922. Government of Palestine.
- Conder, C.R.; Kitchener, H.H. (1882). The Survey of Western Palestine: Memoirs of the Topography, Orography, Hydrography, and Archaeology. Vol. 2. London: Committee of the Palestine Exploration Fund.
- Finkelstein, I.; Lederman, Zvi, eds. (1997). Highlands of many cultures. Tel Aviv: Institute of Archaeology of Tel Aviv University Publications Section. ISBN 965-440-007-3.
- Government of Jordan, Department of Statistics (1964). First Census of Population and Housing. Volume I: Final Tables; General Characteristics of the Population (PDF).
- Government of Palestine, Department of Statistics (1945). Village Statistics, April, 1945.
- Guérin, V. (1875). Description Géographique Historique et Archéologique de la Palestine (in French). Vol. 2: Samarie, pt. 2. Paris: L'Imprimerie Nationale.
- Hadawi, S. (1970). Village Statistics of 1945: A Classification of Land and Area ownership in Palestine. Palestine Liberation Organization Research Center.
- Le Strange, G. (1890). Palestine Under the Moslems: A Description of Syria and the Holy Land from A.D. 650 to 1500. Committee of the Palestine Exploration Fund.
- Mills, E., ed. (1932). Census of Palestine 1931. Population of Villages, Towns and Administrative Areas. Jerusalem: Government of Palestine.
- Palmer, E.H. (1881). The Survey of Western Palestine: Arabic and English Name Lists Collected During the Survey by Lieutenants Conder and Kitchener, R. E. Transliterated and Explained by E.H. Palmer. Committee of the Palestine Exploration Fund.
- Robinson, E.; Smith, E. (1841). Biblical Researches in Palestine, Mount Sinai and Arabia Petraea: A Journal of Travels in the year 1838. Vol. 3. Boston: Crocker & Brewster.
- Wilson, C.W. (1881). Picturesque Palestine, Sinai and Egypt. Vol. 1. New York: D. Appleton.
