= Jayyous =

Jayyus
- Municipality type D (Village council)

Arabic transcription(s)
  - Arabic: جيوس
  - Latin: Jayyus (official)
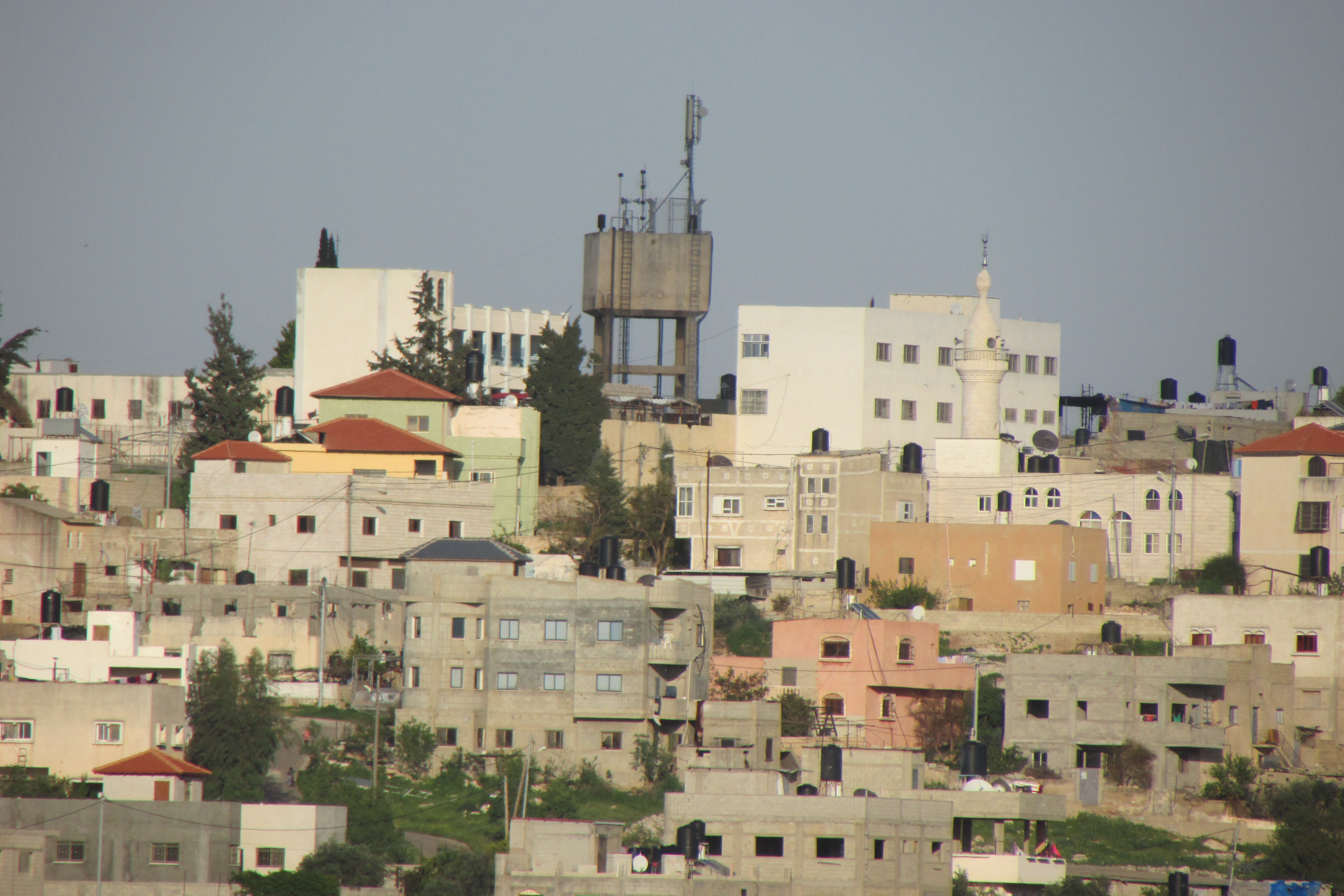
- Jayyus, 2016

- Location of Jayyus within Palestine
- Coordinates: 32°12′05″N 35°02′06″E
- Palestine grid: 153/178
- State: State of Palestine
- Governorate: Qalqilya

Government
  - Type: Village council
- Elevation: 188–233 m (617–764 ft)

Population (2017)
  - Total: 3,478
- Name meaning: Jiyus, personal name

Jayyus (Arabic: جيوس) is a Palestinian village near the west border of the West Bank, close to Qalqilya. It is a farming community. According to the Palestinian Central Bureau of Statistics, the village had a population of 3,478 inhabitants in 2017.

== Location ==
Jayyus (including Khirbet Sir) is located 7 kilometers (4.3 mi)-9 kilometers (5.6 mi) northeast of Qalqiliya. It is bordered by Baqat al Hatab and Kafr Laqif to the east, Kafr Jamal, Kafr Zibad and Kafr ‘Abbush to the south, ‘Azzun, ‘Izbat at Tabib, An Nabi Elyas and ‘Arab Abu Farda to the west, and the Green Line to the north.

== History ==
At Khirbet Sir, just east of Jayyus, two rock-cut tombs have been found, with a large mound with terraces cut in the sides, and a good well below. Byzantine ceramics have also been found.

=== Ottoman era ===
Jayyus was incorporated into the Ottoman Empire in 1517 with all of Palestine, and in 1596 it appeared in the tax registers as being in the Nahiya of Bani Sa'b of the Liwa of Nablus. It had a population of 24 households and 6 bachelors, all Muslim. The villagers paid taxes on wheat, barley, summer crops, olive trees, occasional revenues, goats and/or beehives; a total of 11,746 akçe. Half of the revenue went to a Muslim charitable endowment.

According to historian Roy Marom, in the 18th or early 19th centuries, residents of Jayyous affiliated with the Qaysi camp during the Qays and Yaman conflicts, alongside residents of Deir Abu Mash'al and part of the residents of Bayt Nabala. They fought several skirmishes against Yamani rivals from Qibya and Dayr Tarif.

In 1838, Robinson noted the village, called Jiyus, as being in the Beni Sa'ab district, west of Nablus.

In the 1860s, the Ottoman authorities granted the village an agricultural plot of land called Ghabat Jayyus in the former confines of the Forest of Arsur (Ar. Al-Ghaba) in the coastal plain, west of the village.

In 1870/1871 (1288 AH), an Ottoman census listed the village in the nahiya (sub-district) of Bani Sa'b.

In 1882, the PEF's Survey of Western Palestine described Jiyus as a "moderate-sized stone village on a ridge, with olives to the south-east. It appears to be an ancient site, having rock-cut tombs and ancient wells."

In the 19th century and early 20th century the village was dominated by the Palestinian el-Jayusah or Jayyusi clan.

=== British Mandate era ===
In the 1922 census of Palestine conducted by the British Mandate authorities, Jaiyus had a population of 433, all Muslims, increasing in the 1931 census to 569, again all Muslim, in a total of 147 houses.

In the 1945 statistics the population of Jayyus consisted of 830 Muslims with a land area of 12,571 dunams according to an official land and population survey. Of this, 1,556 dunams were designated for plantations and irrigable land, 2,155 for cereals, while 22 dunams were built-up areas.

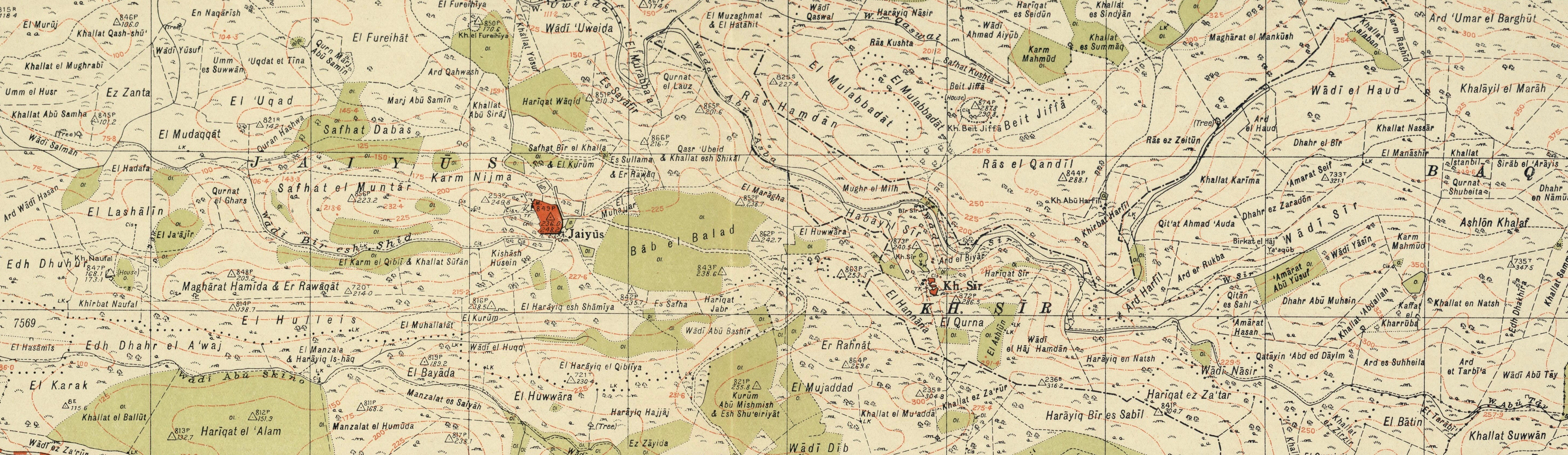
Jayyous 1943 1:20,000

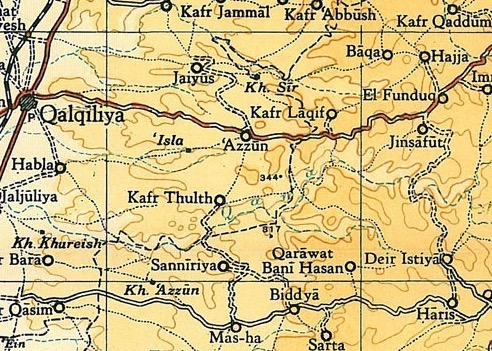
Jayyous 1945 1:250,000

=== Jordanian era ===
In the wake of the 1948 Arab–Israeli War, and after the 1949 Armistice Agreements, Jayyus came under Jordanian rule.

=== Post-1967 ===
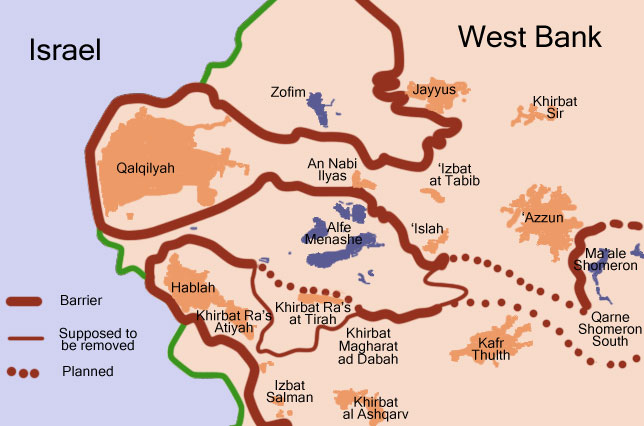
Portion of West Bank showing Jayyus, and Qalqilya and Hableh enclaves

Since the Six-Day War in 1967, Jayyus has been under Israeli occupation.

After the 1995 accords, 26.6% of Jayyus land is defined as Area B land, while the remaining 73.4% is defined as Area C land.

The village is located in an area directly affected by the Israeli-built barrier and around 75 per cent of the village's farming land is on the other side of the wall. In order to get to their land the farmers need to use one of two gates, North gate or South gate, or gates number 943 and 979 respectively. The two gates are supposed to be open for three short periods a day. In June 2005, the gates were usually closed, and farmers were staging regular protests at the gates. As of February 2007, the gates are open for only three hours per day - one hour each morning, afternoon and evening on average.

In 2002, Jayyus became the first village to mount a non-violent campaign with Israeli and international participation against the construction of the wall and the expansion of settlements on its land. According to The Financial Times, 50 percent of the once-prosperous Jayyus villagers are now dependent on foreign food aid because their agricultural land has been cut off by the wall. In January 2005 Ta'ayush activists along with Gush Shalom, the Israeli Committee Against House Demolitions, Machsom Watch and Anarchists Against the Wall, together with residents of the Palestinian village, began to plant hundreds of olive saplings which they had brought with them to the plot of land where the bulldozers of the settlers had uprooted hundreds of olive trees. Advocate Wiam Shbeyta, an activist of the Ta'ayush movement, said:

"In spite of the police and army assertions, we do not recognise the ownership of the settlers over this land. This land belongs to the Jayyus villagers and the company "Geulat HaKarka" which is associated with the settlers took control of it on the false assertion that it was sold to them. The matter is still awaiting legal review, and we will not allow the settlers to dictate facts on the ground, to grab Palestinian lands and to commence establishing a new settlement on it."

According to ARIJ, Israel confiscated 753 dunums of land from Jayyus in order to construct the Israeli settlement of Tzofim.

Falkirk, Scotland, maintains a sister-city partnership with Jayyus.

== Demography ==
=== Local origins ===
Residents of the village originated from the village of Beita, near Nablus, and Majdal Yaba, a now depopulated village near Rosh HaAyin.

== Bibliography ==
- Barron, J.B., ed. (1923). Palestine: Report and General Abstracts of the Census of 1922. Government of Palestine.
- Conder, C.R.; Kitchener, H.H. (1882). The Survey of Western Palestine: Memoirs of the Topography, Orography, Hydrography, and Archaeology. Vol. 2. London: Committee of the Palestine Exploration Fund.
- Dauphin, C. (1998). La Palestine byzantine, Peuplement et Populations. BAR International Series 726 (in French). Vol. III : Catalogue. Oxford: Archeopress. ISBN 0-860549-05-4.
- Department of Statistics (1945). Village Statistics, April, 1945. Government of Palestine.
- Hadawi, S. (1970). Village Statistics of 1945: A Classification of Land and Area ownership in Palestine. Palestine Liberation Organization Research Center.
- Hütteroth, W.-D.; Abdulfattah, K. (1977). Historical Geography of Palestine, Transjordan and Southern Syria in the Late 16th Century. Erlanger Geographische Arbeiten, Sonderband 5. Erlangen, Germany: Vorstand der Fränkischen Geographischen Gesellschaft. ISBN 3-920405-41-2.
- Macalister, R.A.S. (1905). "The modern inhabitants of Palestine". Quarterly Statement - Palestine Exploration Fund. 37: 343–356. doi:10.1179/peq.1905.37.4.343.
- Mills, E., ed. (1932). Census of Palestine 1931. Population of Villages, Towns and Administrative Areas. Jerusalem: Government of Palestine.
- Palmer, E.H. (1881). The Survey of Western Palestine: Arabic and English Name Lists Collected During the Survey by Lieutenants Conder and Kitchener, R. E. Transliterated and Explained by E.H. Palmer. Committee of the Palestine Exploration Fund.
- Robinson, E.; Smith, E. (1841). Biblical Researches in Palestine, Mount Sinai and Arabia Petraea: A Journal of Travels in the year 1838. Vol. 3. Boston: Crocker & Brewster.
