= Dayr Sim'an =

Dayr Sim'an, also transliterated Deir Semaan and Deir Sam'an (lit. "the Monastery of Simon") may refer to the following places in the Levant:

== Syria ==
- Church of Saint Simeon Stylites, a 5th-century church complex near Aleppo
- Deir Sharqi, a village near Maarrat al-Nu'man, formerly called Dayr al-Naqira or Dayr Sim'an

== Palestine ==
- Deir Samaan, a village in the northern West Bank
