= Kafr ad-Dik =

Village in Salfit Governorate, West Bank

- Municipality type C

Arabic transcription(s)
  - Arabic: كفر الديك
  - Latin: Kafr al-Deek (official); Kafar ad-Deek (unofficial)
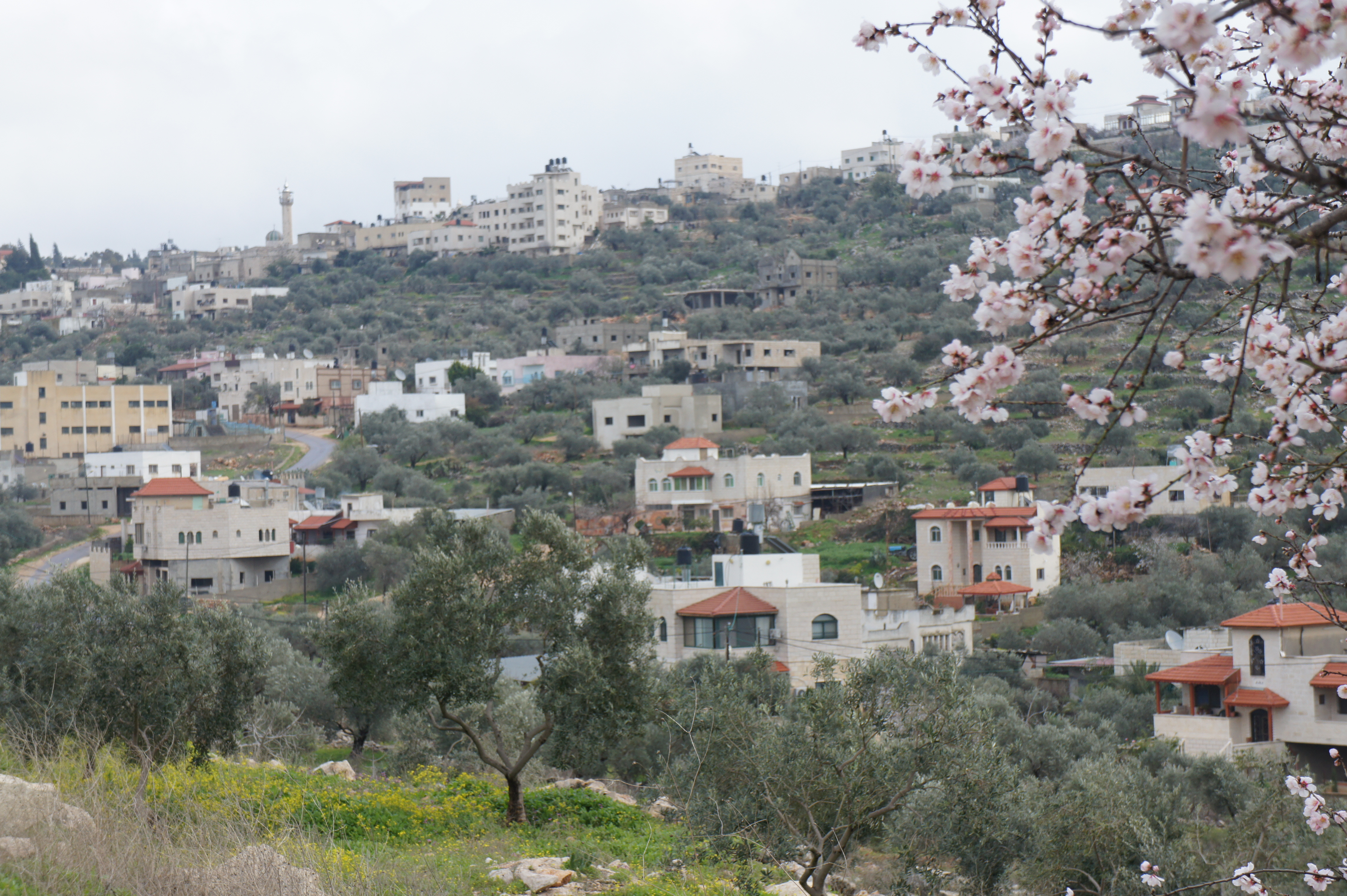
- Kafr ad-Dik, 2012

- Location of Kafr ad-Dik within Palestine
- Coordinates: 32°04′00″N 35°04′59″E
- Palestine grid: 157/163
- State: State of Palestine
- Governorate: Salfit

Government
  - Type: Municipality

Area
  - Total: 15.2 km^{2} (5.9 sq mi)
- Elevation: 375 m (1,230 ft)

Population (2017)
  - Total: 5,551
  - Density: 365/km^{2} (946/sq mi)
- Name meaning: "Village of the Rooster", "The Village"

Kafr ad-Dik (Arabic: كفر الديك) is a Palestinian town located 9.5 kilometers west of Salfit in the Salfit Governorate of Palestine, in the northern West Bank. According to the Palestinian Central Bureau of Statistics (PCBS), the town had a population of 5,551 in 2017.

In 2007, 70% of the families in Kafr ad-Dik engaged in agriculture as their main source of income, while the remaining 30% worked in the private and public sectors. The unemployment rate in the town was 60%.

The town's total land area consists of 15,228 dunams of which 578 dunams are built-up. The archaeological ruins of Deir Samaan are located on the village outskirts.

The Israeli settlements of Peduel and Alei Zahav were established on 1,448 dunams of land claimed by Kafr ad-Dik. Since the Oslo II Accord, 1,953 dunums of Kafr ad-Dik are classified as Area B, under Palestinian control, while 13,275 dunams are classified as Area C, under Israeli control.

== Location ==
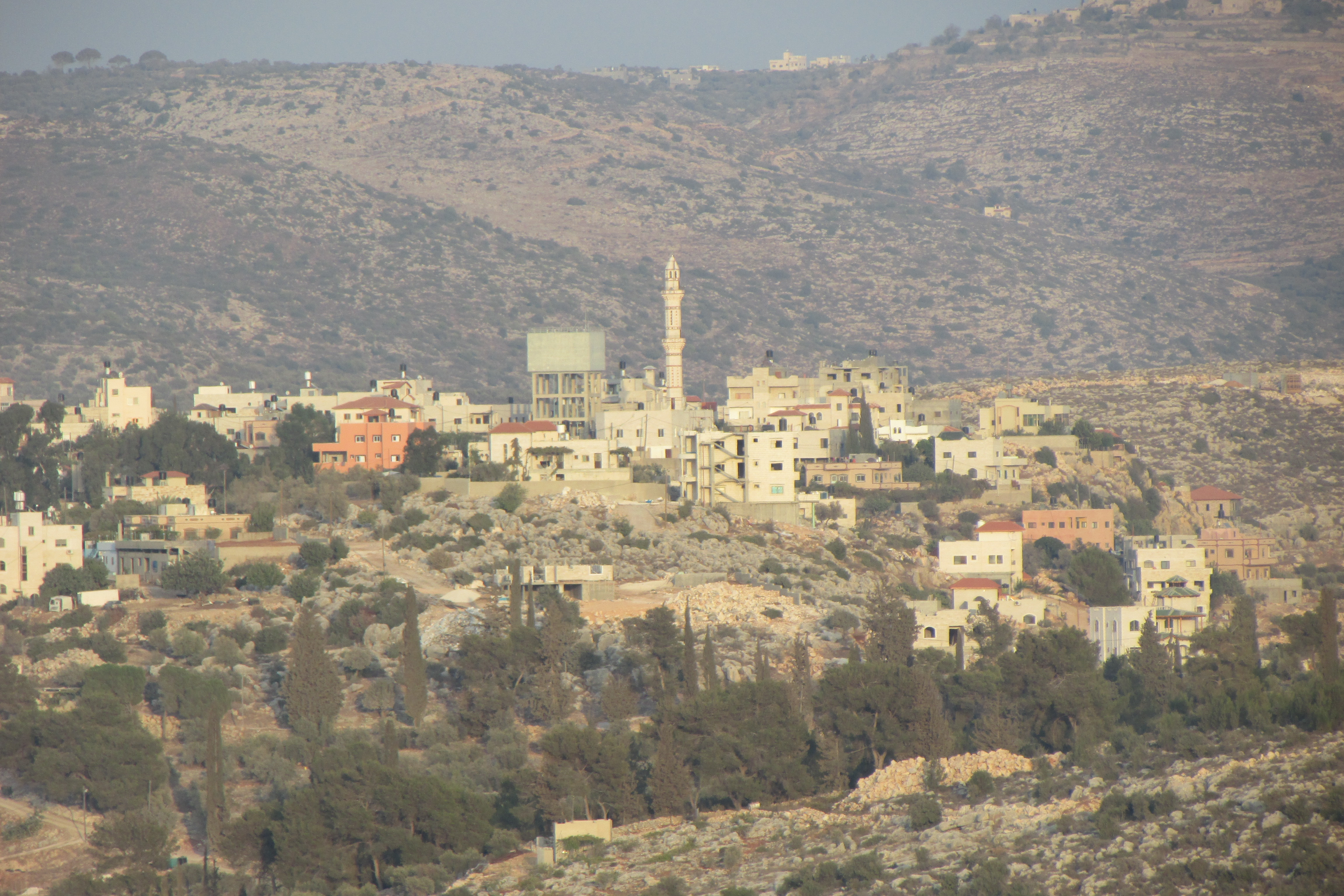
View of Kafr ad-Dik

Kafr ad Dik located 9.59 kilometers (5.96 mi) west of Salfit. It is bordered by Bruqin to the east, Bani Zaid to the south, Rafat and Deir Ballut to the west, and Biddya and Sarta to the north.

== History ==
Archaeological surveys have not been conducted at the village.

It has been suggested that this is the place mentioned in Crusader sources under the name of Caphaer; a village connected with the Casale Santa Maria. In 1175, Crusader sources mentions a former cistern-keeper of the village. In 1176, the revenues from Caphaer (=Kafr ad-Dik) and caslia S. Maria (=Aboud) were given for the provision of white bread for the sick in the Hospital in Jerusalem.

The coat of arms the Mamluk Sultan Qaitbay (1468–1496 C.E.) have been found in a mosque in the village.

=== Ottoman era ===
This village may be the Kufeir Bani Humeid of the 1596 Ottoman tax records, with 83 Muslim families.

In the 16th century, the neighboring village of Susya was listed as inhabited, but it became abandoned before the 19th century, with its land being absorbed by Kafr al-Dik.

In the 18th and 19th centuries, the village formed part of the highland region known as Jūrat ‘Amra or Bilād Jammā‘īn. Situated between Dayr Ghassāna in the south and the present Route 5 in the north, and between Majdal Yābā in the west and Jammā‘īn, Mardā and Kifl Ḥāris in the east, this area served, according to historian Roy Marom, "as a buffer zone between the political-economic-social units of the Jerusalem and the Nablus regions. On the political level, it suffered from instability due to the migration of the Bedouin tribes and constant competition among local clans for the right to collect taxes on behalf of the Ottoman authorities."

In 1838 it was referred to as el-Kufr, part of the Jurat Merda district, south of Nablus.

In 1870 Victor Guérin found two birkets cut in the rock, one 15 paces long by 12 broad, the other not quite so large; about 30 cisterns and 20 tombs cut in the rock, some with sepulchral chambers, their walls pierced with loculi, others simple graves, either intended for a single body or having right and left vaulted tombs with arcosolia. These graves were formerly covered with stone slabs. There were also several lintels, decorated with the rectangular cartouche, on either side of which were triangles, and in the middle a cross. There are four mosques, built with stones and columns belonging to a Christian church. There is also a square tower, measuring 7 paces on each side. It is lit by loopholes, and is covered with immense slabs forming a roof, and supported by vaulted arcades. Within it is a cistern. On the lintel is a cross with equal branches inserted in a circle near four semicircles, which lie in a four-leaved rose. This tower formed part of a larger building, now destroyed.

Guérin writes that the houses were constructed from red and white stone masonry, as in Deir Ghassaneh and Beit Rima.

In 1870/1871 (1288 AH), an Ottoman census listed the village in the nahiya (sub-district) of Jamma'in al-Thani, subordinate to Nablus.

In 1882, the PEF's Survey of Western Palestine described a hillside village of moderate size with ancient rock-cut tombs to the east.

=== British Mandate era ===
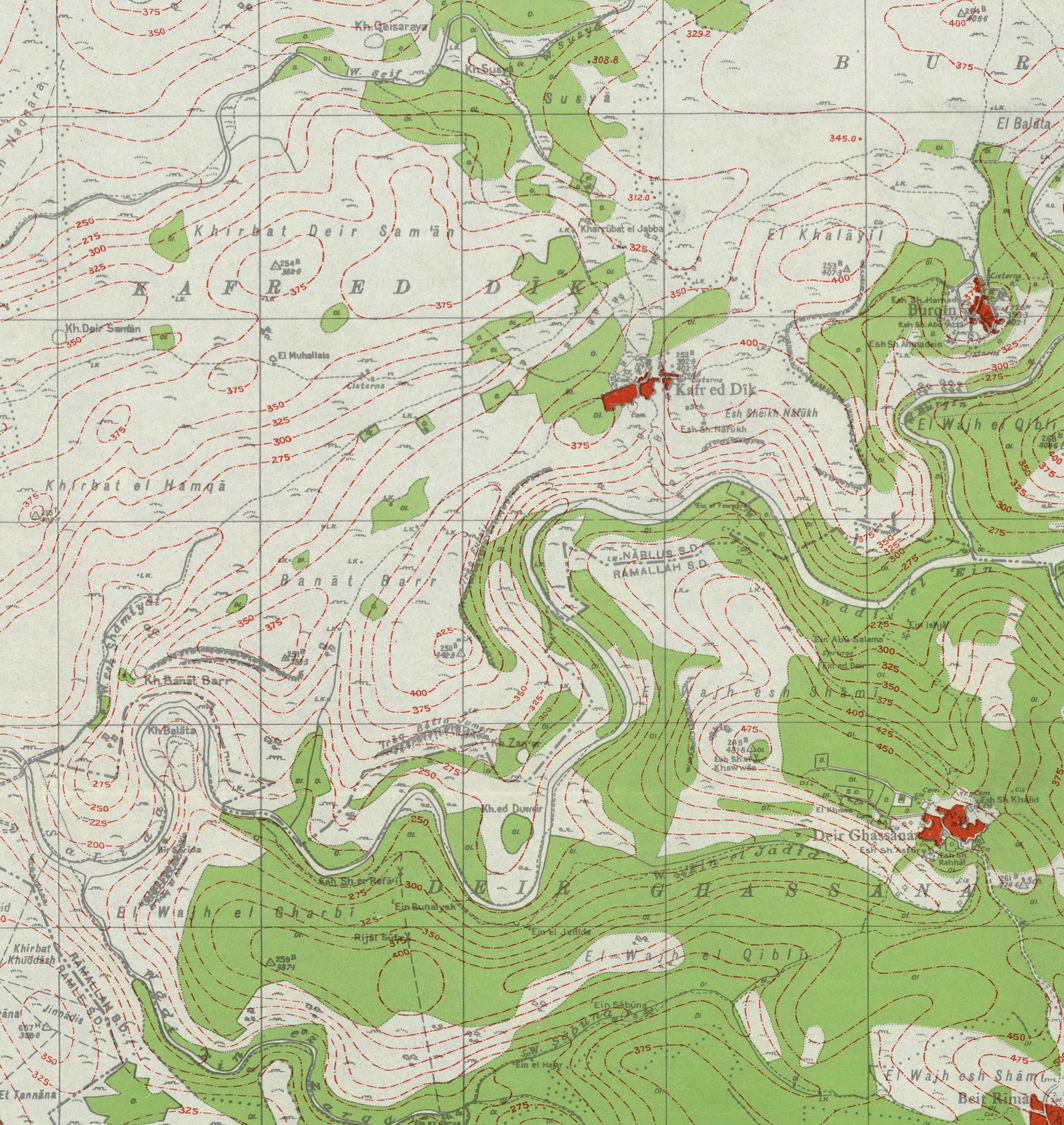
Kafr ad-Dik 1943 1:20,000

In the 1922 census of Palestine conducted by the British Mandate authorities, Kufr al-Dik had a population of 487, all Muslim, increasing in the 1931 census to 665, still all Muslim, in 139 houses.

In the 1945 statistics the population was 870, all Muslims, while the total land area was 15,308 dunams, according to an official land and population survey. Of this, 2,075 were used for plantations and irrigable land, 2,603 for cereals, while 58 dunams were classified as built-up areas.

=== Jordanian era ===
In the wake of the 1948 Arab–Israeli War, and after the 1949 Armistice Agreements, Kafr ad-Dik came under Jordanian rule. It was annexed by Jordan in 1950.

In 1961, the population was 1,365.

=== 1967–present ===
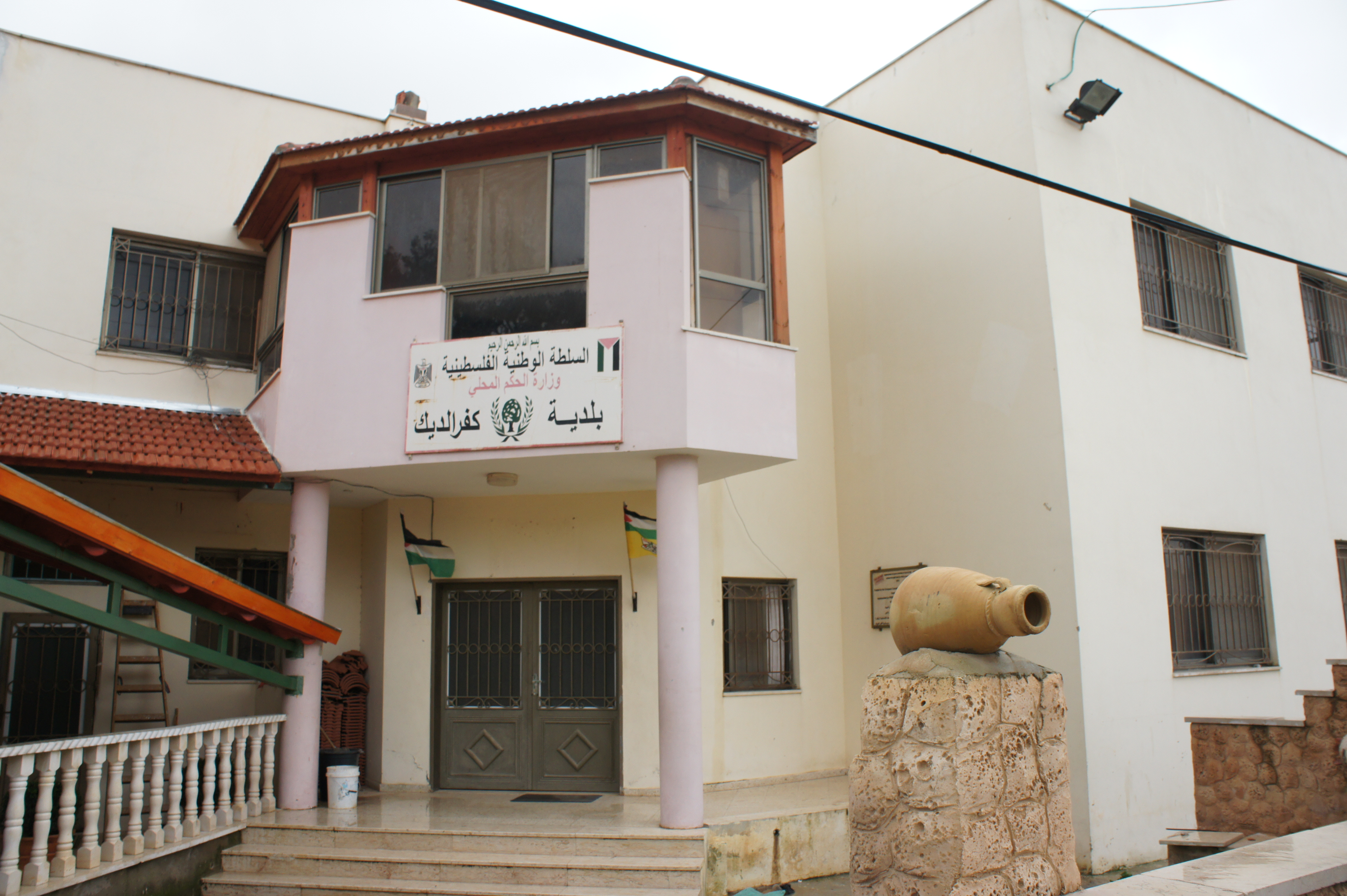
The municipality of Kafr ad-Dik

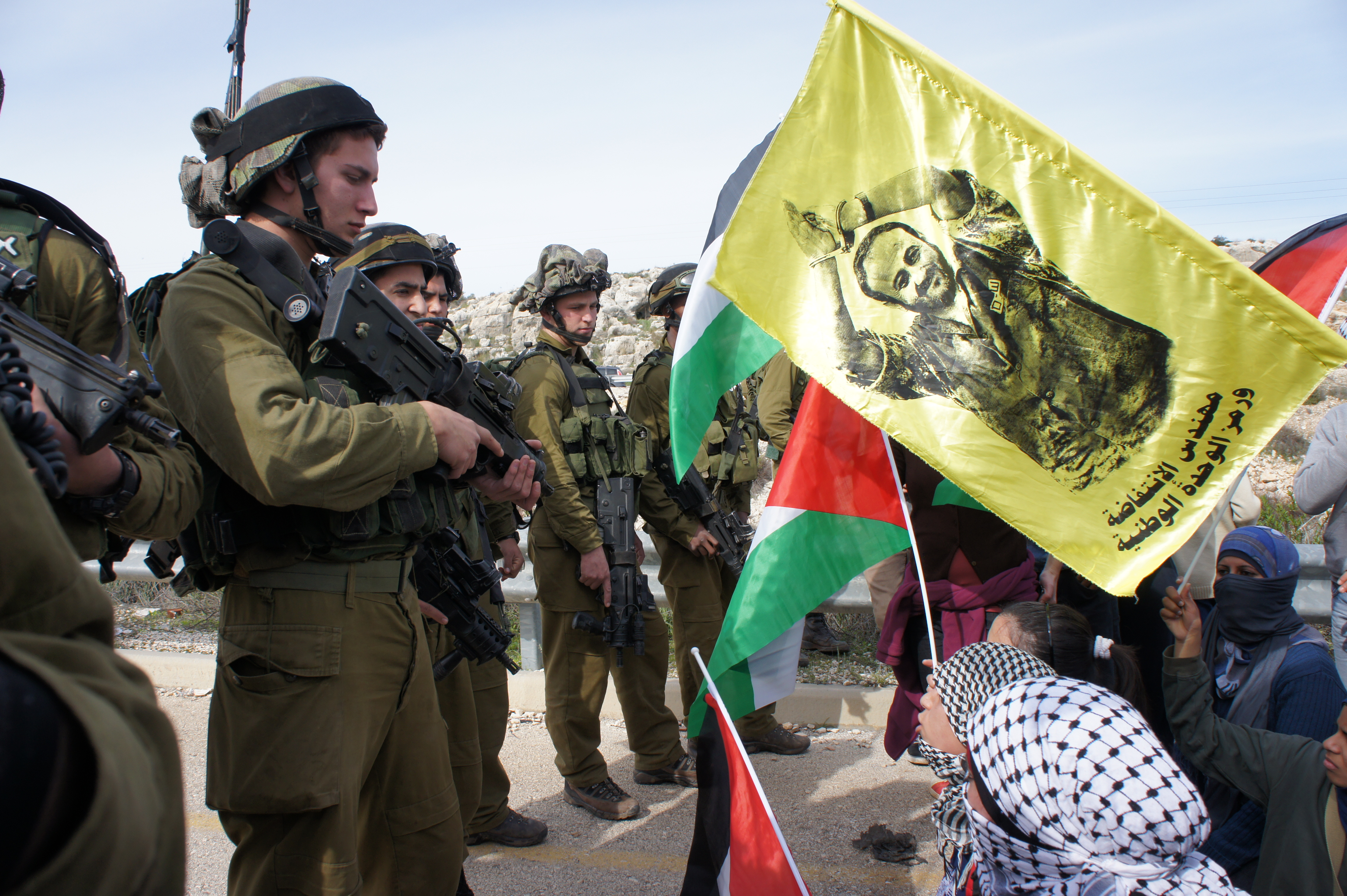
Protest against Israeli confiscation of land, Kufr ad-Deek, Palestine, February, 2012

Since the Six-Day War in 1967, Kafr ad-Dik has been under Israeli occupation.

After the 1995 accords, 14.5% of village land was classified as Area B, the remaining 85.5% as Area C. Land was expropriated for the construction of Israeli settlements:

- 594 dunams for Pedu'el,
- 300 dunams for Alei Zahav,
- 144 dunams for Har Alei Zahav, and
- 246 dunams for an industrial zone, near Pedu'el.

After an Israeli court approved the expropriation of 3,000 dunams (750 acres) of private land in Kafr ad-Dik's Thahir Subih neighborhood, bulldozers reportedly uprooted dozens of olive trees and fruit trees while leveling over 10,000 dunams (2,500 acres). The Israel Civil Administration spokesperson said the works were part of a national agricultural development plan. In Israel's view, these are Israeli state lands.

== Demography ==
Residents of Deir Istiya, Sanniriya, Kafr Jammal, Attil, Annaba, Ballut and Nablus, trace their ancestry back to this village.

== Bibliography ==
- Barron, J.B., ed. (1923). Palestine: Report and General Abstracts of the Census of 1922. Government of Palestine.
- Clermont-Ganneau, C.S. (1898). "La carte de la Palestine d'après la mosaïque de Madeba". Recueil d'Archéologie. Jérusalem. 2: 166-176.
- Conder, C.R.; Kitchener, H.H. (1882). The Survey of Western Palestine: Memoirs of the Topography, Orography, Hydrography, and Archaeology. Vol. 2. London: Committee of the Palestine Exploration Fund.
- Finkelstein, I.; Lederman, Zvi, eds. (1997). Highlands of many cultures. Tel Aviv: Institute of Archaeology of Tel Aviv University Publications Section. ISBN 965-440-007-3.
- Government of Jordan, Department of Statistics (1964). First Census of Population and Housing. Volume I: Final Tables; General Characteristics of the Population (PDF).
- Government of Palestine, Department of Statistics (1945). Village Statistics, April, 1945.
- Guérin, V. (1875). Description Géographique Historique et Archéologique de la Palestine (in French). Vol. 2: Samarie, pt. 2. Paris: L'Imprimerie Nationale.
- Hadawi, S. (1970). Village Statistics of 1945: A Classification of Land and Area ownership in Palestine. Palestine Liberation Organization Research Centre.
- Hütteroth, W.-D.; Abdulfattah, K. (1977). Historical Geography of Palestine, Transjordan and Southern Syria in the Late 16th Century. Erlanger Geographische Arbeiten, Sonderband 5. Erlangen, Germany: Vorstand der Fränkischen Geographischen Gesellschaft. ISBN 3-920405-41-2.
- Mills, E., ed. (1932). Census of Palestine 1931. Population of Villages, Towns and Administrative Areas. Jerusalem: Government of Palestine.
- Palmer, E.H. (1881). The Survey of Western Palestine: Arabic and English Name Lists Collected During the Survey by Lieutenants Conder and Kitchener, R. E. Transliterated and Explained by E.H. Palmer. Committee of the Palestine Exploration Fund.
- Pringle, D. (1993). The Churches of the Crusader Kingdom of Jerusalem: A-K (excluding Acre and Jerusalem). Vol. 1. Cambridge University Press. ISBN 9780521390361.
- Pringle, D. (1997). Secular buildings in the Crusader Kingdom of Jerusalem: an archaeological Gazetter. Cambridge University Press. ISBN 0521-46010-7.
- Robinson, E.; Smith, E. (1841). Biblical Researches in Palestine, Mount Sinai and Arabia Petraea: A Journal of Travels in the year 1838. Vol. 3. Boston: Crocker & Brewster.
- Röhricht, R. (1893). (RRH) Regesta regni Hierosolymitani (MXCVII-MCCXCI) (in Latin). Berlin: Libraria Academica Wageriana.
