= Kafr Jammal =

Kufr Jammal Kufr Jamaal
- Municipality type D (Village council)
- Kafr Jamal

Hebrew transcription(s)
  - Judaic: כפר ג'מאל
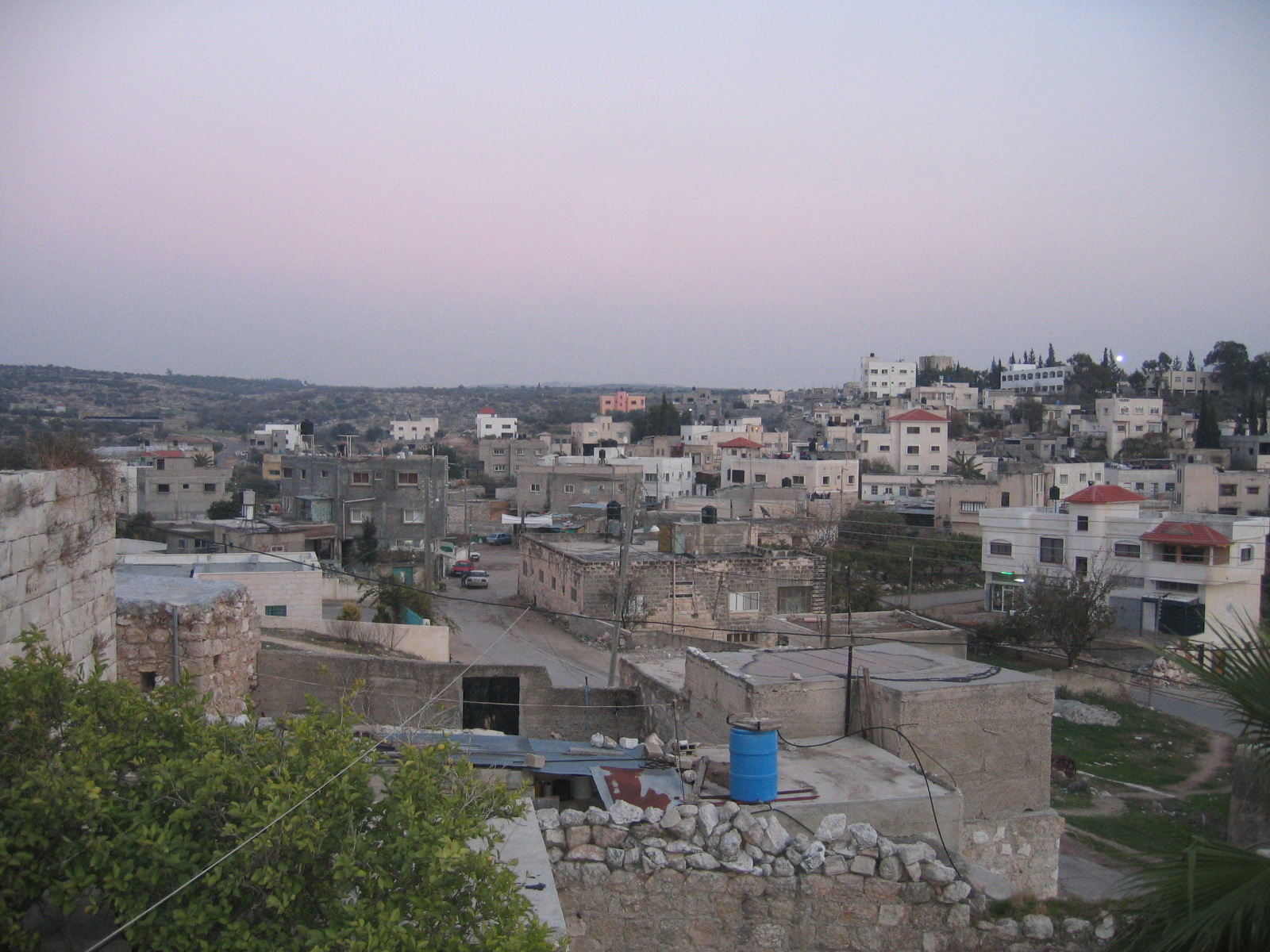
- Kufr Jammal

- Location of Kufr Jammal within Palestine
- Coordinates: 32°13′31″N 35°02′39″E
- Palestine grid: 154/181
- State: State of Palestine
- Governorate: Tulkarm

Government
  - Type: Village council

Population (2017)
  - Total: 2,855
- Name meaning: The village of camel-drivers

Kafr Jammal (Arabic: كفر جمّال), is a town in the Tulkarm Governorate in the western edge of the West Bank, Palestine. It is located about halfway between Qalqilyah and Tulkarm, and had a population of 2,855 in 2017. The village is mainly agricultural, and mostly raises olive and citrus crops. Kafr Jammal is at an altitude of 257 meters, and is bordered by Falamya (Falameh, Falāma) in the west, Kafr Zibad in the east, Jayyous in the south, and Kafr Sur to the north.

== History ==
Ceramics from the Byzantine period have been found here.

=== Ottoman period ===
==== 16th century ====
Kafr Jammal was incorporated into the Ottoman Empire in 1517 with all of Palestine, and in 1596 it appeared under that name in the tax registers as being in the Nahiya of Bani Sa'b, part of the Nablus Sanjak. It had a population of 17 households and 13 bachelors, all Muslims. The villagers paid a fixed tax rate of 33.3% on various agricultural products, such as wheat, barley, summer crops, olive trees, goats and/or beehives, in addition to "occasional revenues" and a press for olive oil or grape syrup; a total of 11,074 akçe.

==== 19th century ====
In 1838, Kefr Jemmal was noted as a village in the Beni Sa'ab area, west of Nablus. In 1882, the PEF's Survey of Western Palestine described Kefr Jemmal as "a small stone village on a knoll, with cisterns."

In the 1860s, the Ottoman authorities granted the village an agricultural plot of land called Ghabat Kafr Jammal in the former confines of the Forest of Arsur (Ar. Al-Ghaba) in the coastal plain, west of the village.

In 1870/71 (1288 AH), an Ottoman census listed the village in the nahiya (sub-district) of Bani Sa'b.

=== British Mandate ===
In the 1922 census of Palestine conducted by the British Mandate authorities, Kufr Jammal had a population of 396 Muslims, increasing in the 1931 census to 499; 1 Christian and 498 Muslims, in 109 houses.

In the 1945 statistics the population of Kafr Jammal was of 690 Muslims, with 14,945 dunams of land according to an official land and population survey. Of this, 1,702 dunams were plantations and irrigable land, 4,451 were used for cereals, while 19 dunams were built-up (urban) land.

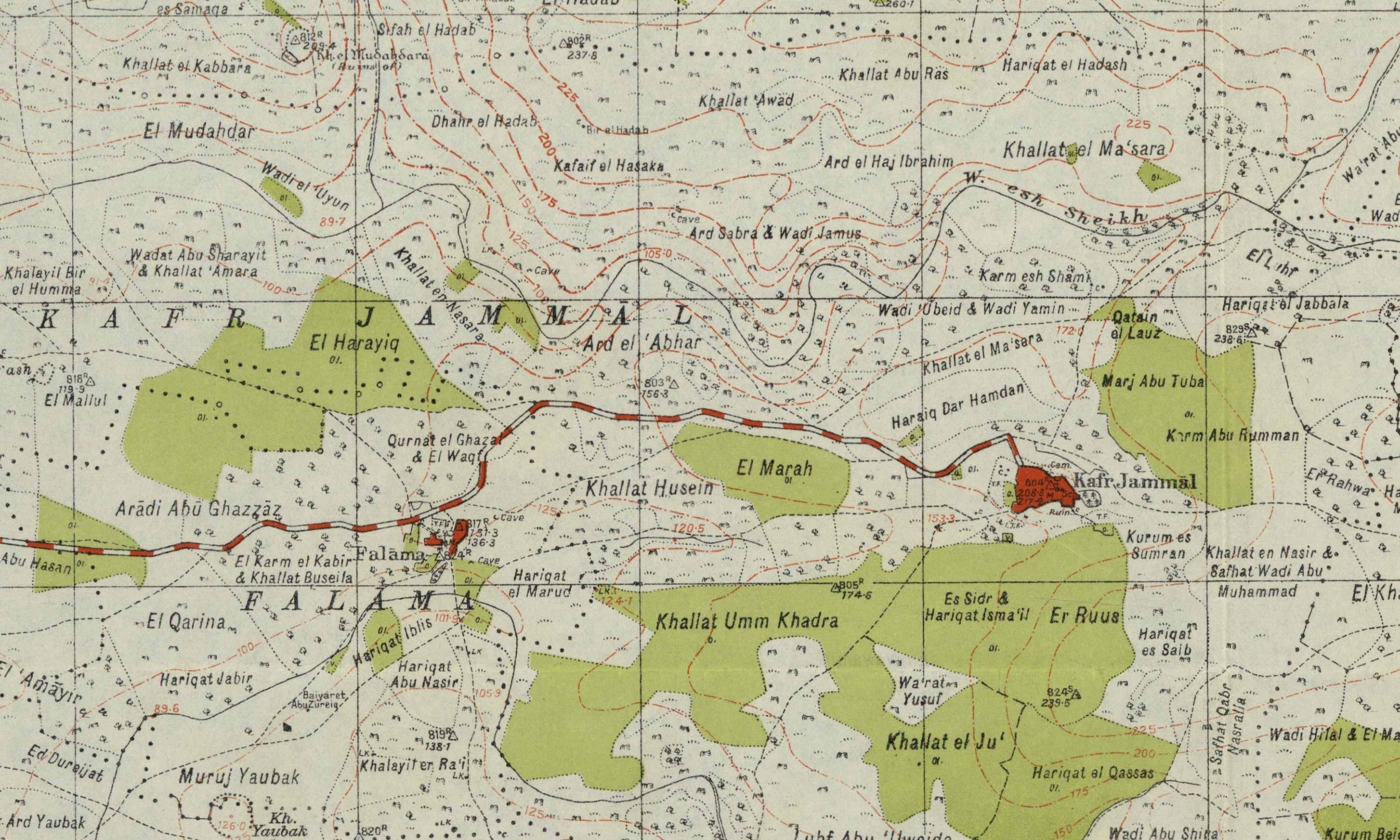
Falāma (west) and Kafr Jammal (east), 1942, 1:20,000

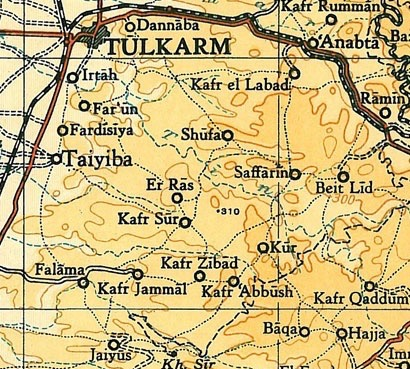
Falāma and Kafr Jammal (left, below Tulkarm), 1945, 1:250,000

=== Jordanian period (1948-1967) ===
In the wake of the 1948 Arab–Israeli War and after the 1949 Armistice Agreements, Kafr Jammal came under Jordanian rule.

In 1961, the population of Kafr Jamal was 1,041.

=== Post 1967 ===
Since the Six-Day War in 1967, Kafr Jammal has been under Israeli occupation.

Kafr Jammal enjoys good relations with neighboring villages, and heavy education and commercial exchange take place among them. The village is also notable for having a large diaspora outside the West Bank, mostly in Jordan, but also in Saudi Arabia and the United States. Kafr Jammal's population follow the Hanbali and Shafi'i fiqh (schools of Sunni Islam).

== Demography ==
=== Local origins ===
The residents of Kafr Jammal have origins in Kafr a-Dik.

== Images ==
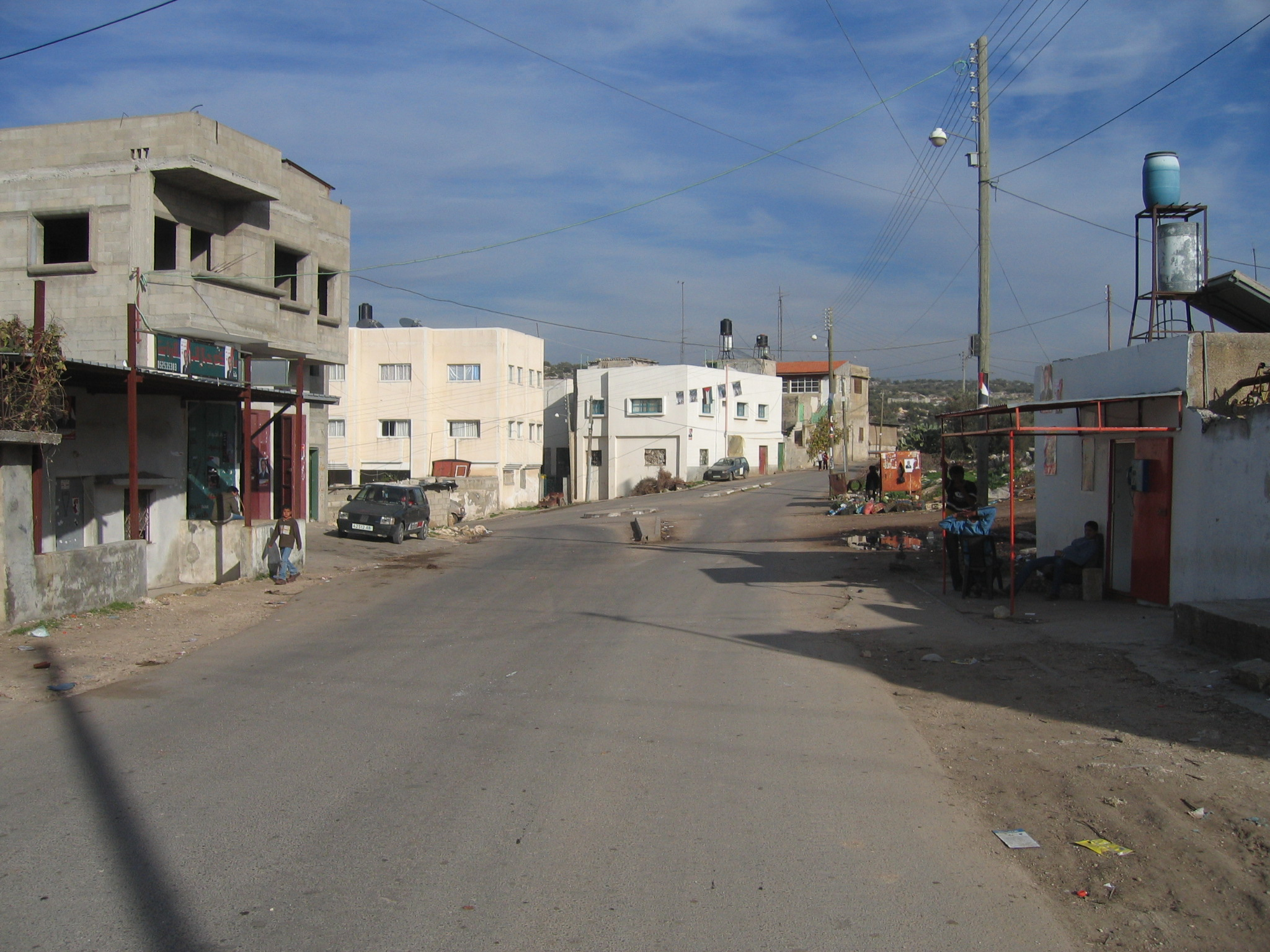
Village center

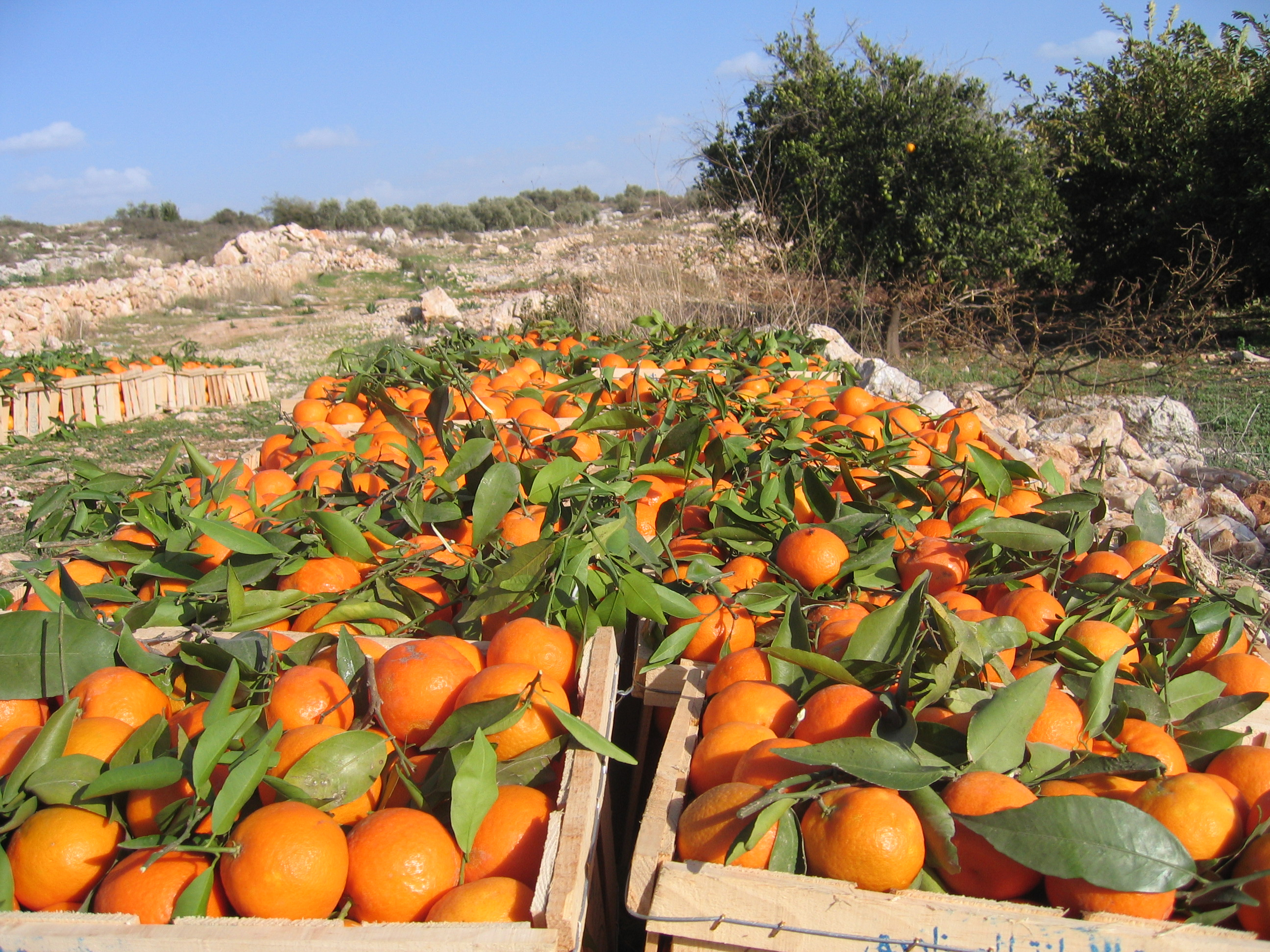
Orange crop

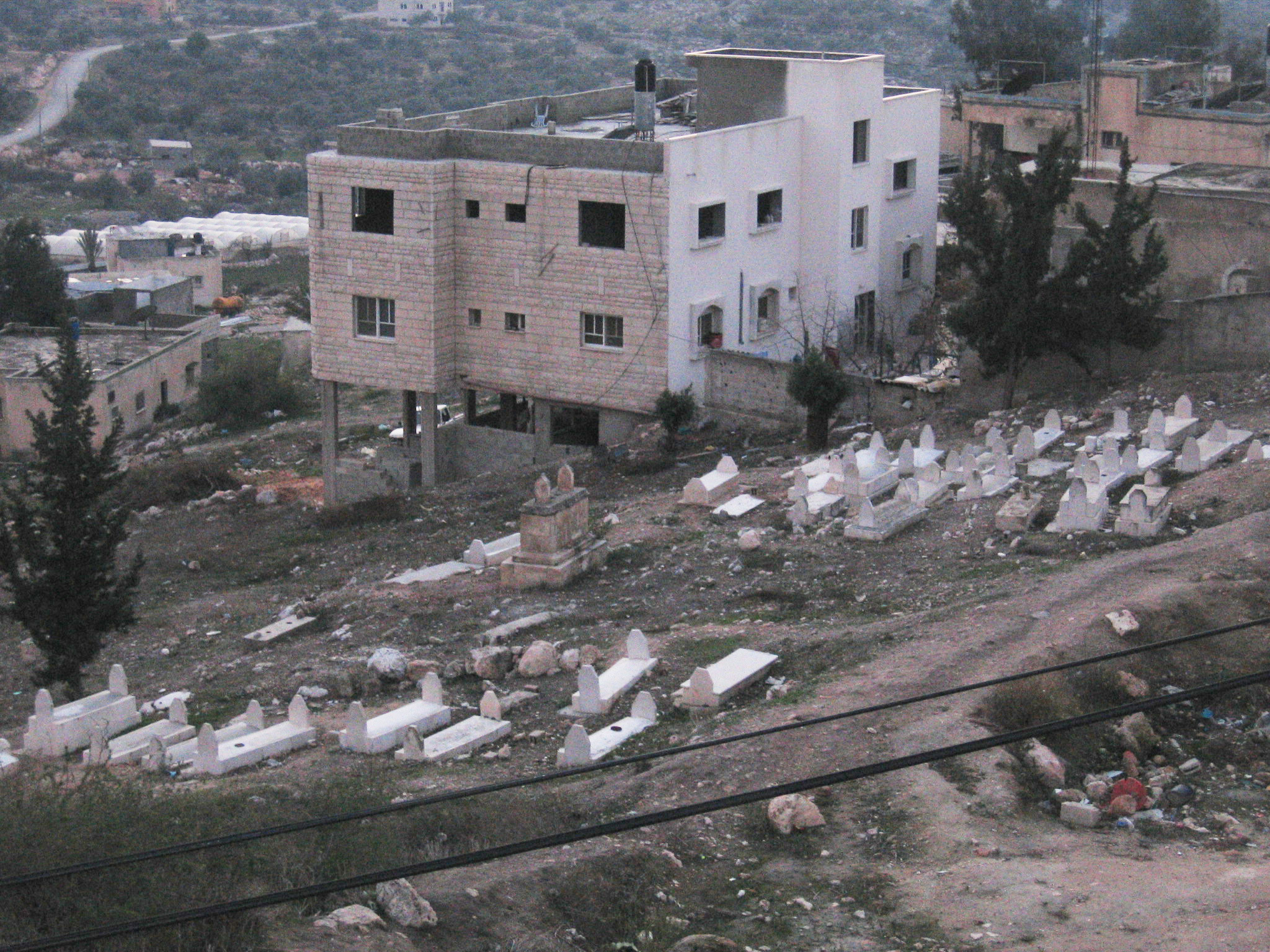
Local cemetery

== Bibliography ==
- Barron, J.B., ed. (1923). Palestine: Report and General Abstracts of the Census of 1922. Government of Palestine.
- Conder, C.R.; Kitchener, H.H. (1882). The Survey of Western Palestine: Memoirs of the Topography, Orography, Hydrography, and Archaeology. Vol. 2. London: Committee of the Palestine Exploration Fund.
- Dauphin, C. (1998). La Palestine byzantine, Peuplement et Populations. BAR International Series 726 (in French). Vol. III : Catalogue. Oxford: Archeopress. ISBN 0-860549-05-4.
- Government of Jordan, Department of Statistics (1964). First Census of Population and Housing. Volume I: Final Tables; General Characteristics of the Population (PDF).
- Government of Palestine, Department of Statistics (1945). Village Statistics, April, 1945.
- Hadawi, S. (1970). Village Statistics of 1945: A Classification of Land and Area ownership in Palestine. Palestine Liberation Organization Research Center.
- Hütteroth, W.-D.; Abdulfattah, K. (1977). Historical Geography of Palestine, Transjordan and Southern Syria in the Late 16th Century. Erlanger Geographische Arbeiten, Sonderband 5. Erlangen, Germany: Vorstand der Fränkischen Geographischen Gesellschaft. ISBN 3-920405-41-2.
- Mills, E., ed. (1932). Census of Palestine 1931. Population of Villages, Towns and Administrative Areas. Jerusalem: Government of Palestine.
- Palmer, E.H. (1881). The Survey of Western Palestine: Arabic and English Name Lists Collected During the Survey by Lieutenants Conder and Kitchener, R. E. Transliterated and Explained by E.H. Palmer. Committee of the Palestine Exploration Fund.
- Robinson, E.; Smith, E. (1841). Biblical Researches in Palestine, Mount Sinai and Arabia Petraea: A Journal of Travels in the year 1838. Vol. 3. Boston: Crocker & Brewster.
