= Alei Zahav =

Israeli settlement in the West Bank

Alei Zahav: עֲלֵי זָהָב (Hebrew)

Hebrew transcription(s)
  - Official: Ale Zahav
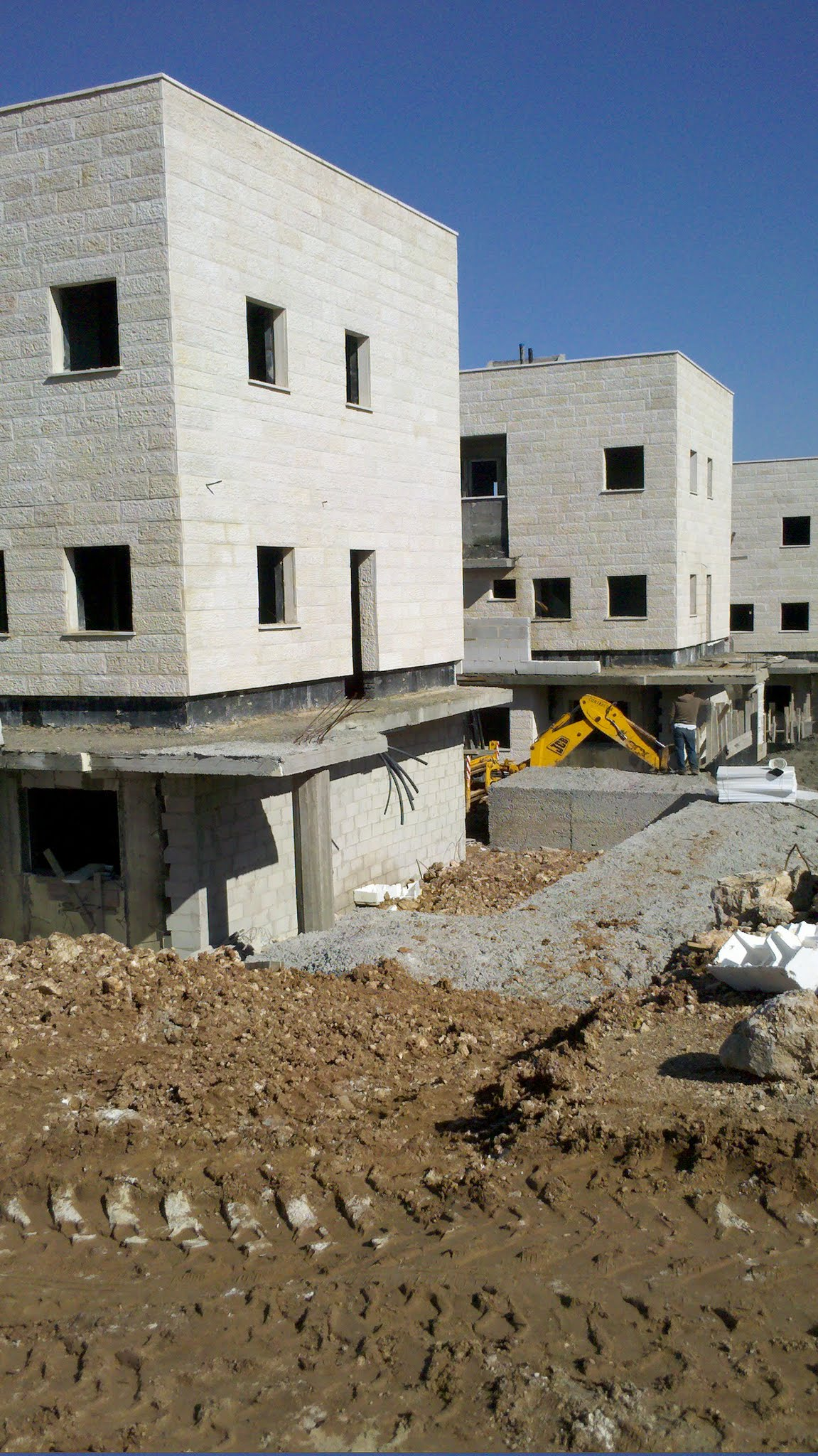
- Houses under construction in Alei Zahav
- Etymology: Golden leaves
- Location within the Northern West Bank
- Coordinates: 32°4′18″N 35°3′51″E
- Country: Palestine
- District: Judea and Samaria Area
- Council: Shomron
- Region: West Bank
- Affiliation: Mishkei Herut Beitar
- Founded: 1983
- Population (2024): 5,473

Alei Zahav (Hebrew: עֲלֵי זָהָב, lit. Golden Leaves) is an Israeli settlement organized as a community settlement located on the western edge of the northern West Bank, adjacent to the Palestinian towns of Deir Ballut and Kafr ad-Dik. The settlement, under the administrative municipal government of the Shomron Regional Council, is adjacent to Peduel and Beit Aryeh. In 2024 its population was 5,473.

The international community considers Israeli settlements in the West Bank illegal under international law, but the Israeli government disputes this.

== History ==
Founded in 1983 on Israeli state lands by non-Orthodox Jewish Israelis from the Beitar and Herut movements, the settlement is now home to about 120 families. The town is named after Aliza Begin, the wife of former Israeli prime minister Menachem Begin. The original name of the town had been Yoezer.

It is now expanding into a settlement called Leshem, which became an independent settlement in March 2025.

Alei Zahav is founded on land which, according to the ARIJ, Israel confiscated from the Palestinian towns of Deir Ballut and Kafr ad-Dik.

== Voting Patterns ==
In the 2026 election, 80 percent of voters in Alei Zahav voted for the parties of the right-wing coalition led by Benjamin Netanyahu, while 7 percent voted for the parties of the center-left coalition led by Gadi Eisenkot. An additional 2.4 percent voted for the Reservists, and 10.1 percent voted for Amcha Yisrael. The Arab praties did not win any votes. 57 percent of voters voted for the Religious Zionist Party. Voter turnout increased 28 percent from the 2022 election.
