= Our Country Palestine (book) =

1965 book by Mustafa Murad Al-Dabbagh

- Author: Mustafa Murad Al-Dabbagh
- Original title: Biladuna Filastin
- Language: Arabic
- Publisher: Dar Al-Tali'ah

The book Our Country Palestine (Arabic: بلادنا فلسطين, romanized: Bilādunā Filasṭīn) is a book dealing with the geography and social history of Palestine in the first half of the twentieth century. It was written by the Palestinian historian Mustafa Murad Al-Dabbagh to document Palestinian villages and towns.

== Description ==
The book consists of several volumes—more than eleven in total—published in stages between the 1950s and the 1980s. It combines geographical, historical, and documentary approaches, providing detailed descriptions of the location of each district and village, their population, educational and economic facilities, as well as information on Palestine's terrain, climate, and administrative divisions throughout history.

== Significance ==
The book is distinguished by its accuracy in gathering information from official sources and statistical reports, making it a fundamental reference for researchers in Palestinian history and geography.

Today, Our Country Palestine is regarded as one of the most important references in Palestinian studies and is used in universities and research centers across the Arab world.

The first edition was published by Dar al-Tali'ah in Beirut in 1965. In 1973, the University Students Association in the Hebron Governorate, in collaboration with Dar al-Tali'ah, reprinted it. Subsequent volumes of the work were published by the author between 1976 and 1986.

All 11 volumes were republished together in 2018 by the Institute for Palestine Studies, with an introduction by Walid Khalidi.

== See also ==
- Mustafa Murad Al-Dabbagh
