= Gerald Moira =

English painter

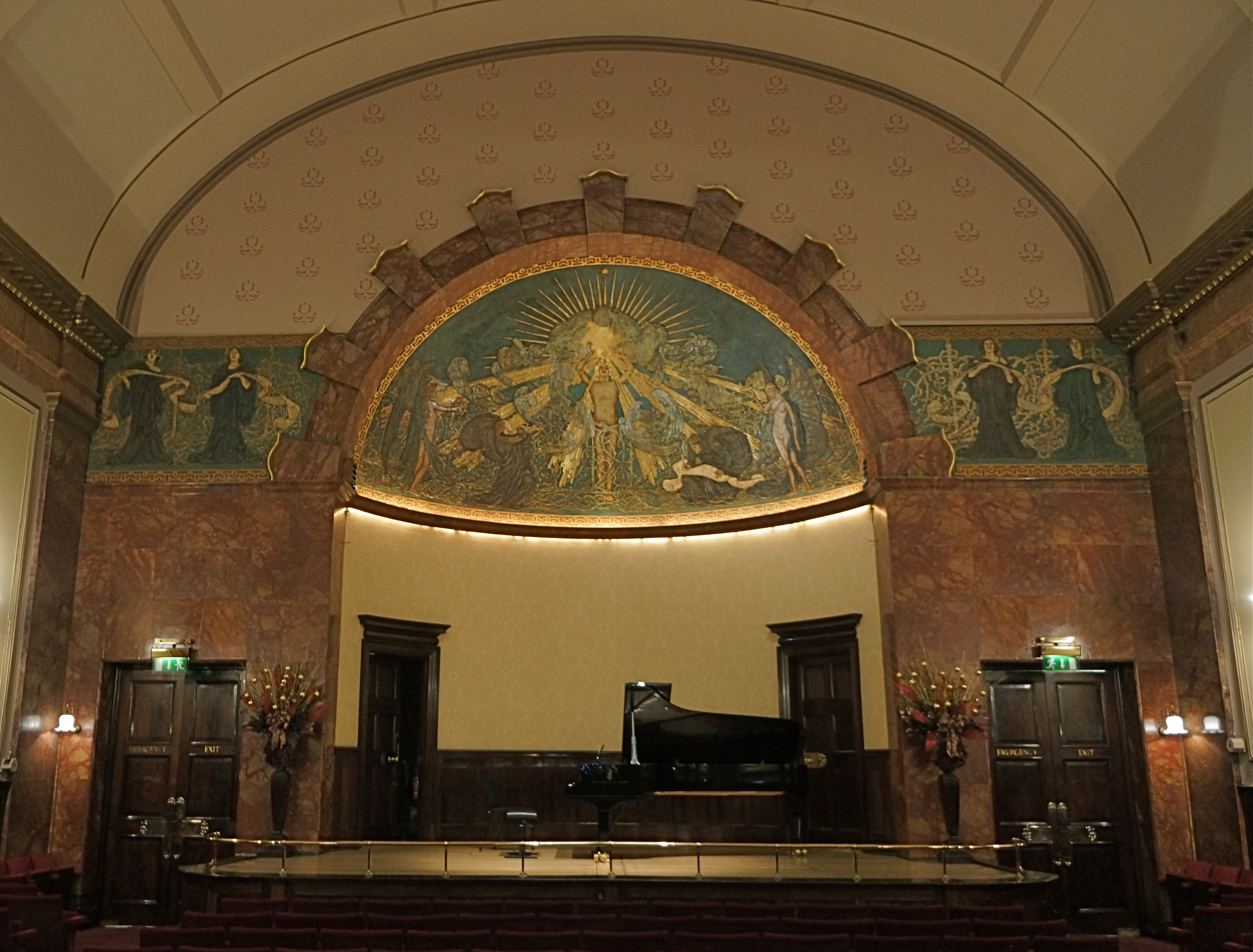
Moira's mural of the "Soul of Music" for the concert hall of the Wigmore Hall, London.

Gerald Edward Moira (26 January 1867 – 2 August 1959) was an English painter who became best known for his murals.

Gerald Moira was born in London, the son of a former Portuguese diplomat who became a miniature painter. He first exhibited at the Royal Academy in 1891. His first commission for a mural was by J. Lyons and Co. for the Trocadero restaurant in Shaftesbury Avenue, London. His other early commissions included the ceilings of the vestry and library of the Unitarian Chapel, Liverpool, the board-room of Lloyd's Register of Shipping, and paintings and stained glass for the Central Criminal Court in London. He also painted in oil, tempera, and watercolour. Moira was principal of the Edinburgh College of Art from 1923 until 1932, president of the Royal Institute of Oil Painters, vice-president of the Royal Watercolour Society, a member of the Royal West of England Academy, and a founder member of the National Portrait Society.
