= Mustafa Murad Al-Dabbagh =

Palestinian writer and teacher

- Born: 1897; Jaffa, Gaza Sanjak, Damascus Eyalet, Ottoman Empire
- Died: September 7, 1989 (aged 91–92); Beirut, Lebanon

Mustafa Murad Al-Dabbagh (c. 1897 - September 7, 1989) was a Palestinian writer and teacher, best known for his book Our Country Palestine, which is considered an important reference documenting information about Palestine and its people.

== Life ==
He was born in Jaffa in 1897 or 1898. He received his primary education there and completed his secondary education at the Sultan's Office in Beirut. In 1915, he served as a reserve officer in the Ottoman Army. He returned to Palestine in 1919, and worked as a teacher and principal in Hebron. He then worked as a social science instructor at the Arab College of Jerusalem.

He also worked as the Undersecretary of the Jordanian Ministry of Education in Amman, Jordan, and as Director of Education in Qatar from 1959 to 1961.

He died on September 7, 1989, in Beirut.

== Selected publications ==
- Biladuna Filastin [Our Country Palestine].
- A Brief History of Palestine. 1960.
- Qatar: Its Past and Present. 1961.
- The Arabian Peninsula. 1962.
- Ancient History of the Arab Homeland. 1951.
- Arab Tribes and Their Descendants in Our Country Palestine. 1979.
- A Brief History of the Arab States and Their Eras in Our Country Palestine. 1980.

== Medals of appreciation ==
He was awarded the Jerusalem Medal for Culture and Arts in 1990.

== See also ==
- Our Country Palestine (book)
