= Deir Samaan =

Deir Samaan (Arabic: دير سمعان) is an archaeological site in the Palestinian town of Kafr ad-Dik, in the Salfit Governorate of the State of Palestine, in the Israeli-occupied West Bank. It consists of a 1,600-year-old ancient Byzantine ruin located on top of a hill.

In 2011, Palestinian media reported that Israel Defense Forces had bulldozed large areas of historical lands of Deir Samaan in the Kufr al-Dik village, for the expansion of a nearby settlement illegally built on Palestinian land. In 2020, it was reported that Israeli forces had started building houses around the archaeological site, indicating the construction of a new Israeli outpost in the area.

== Gallery ==
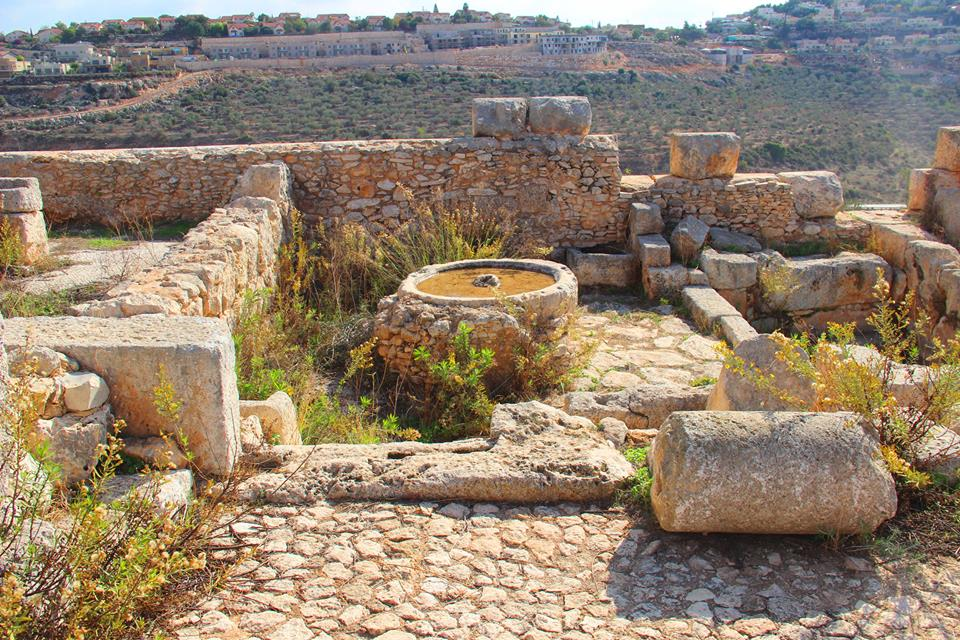

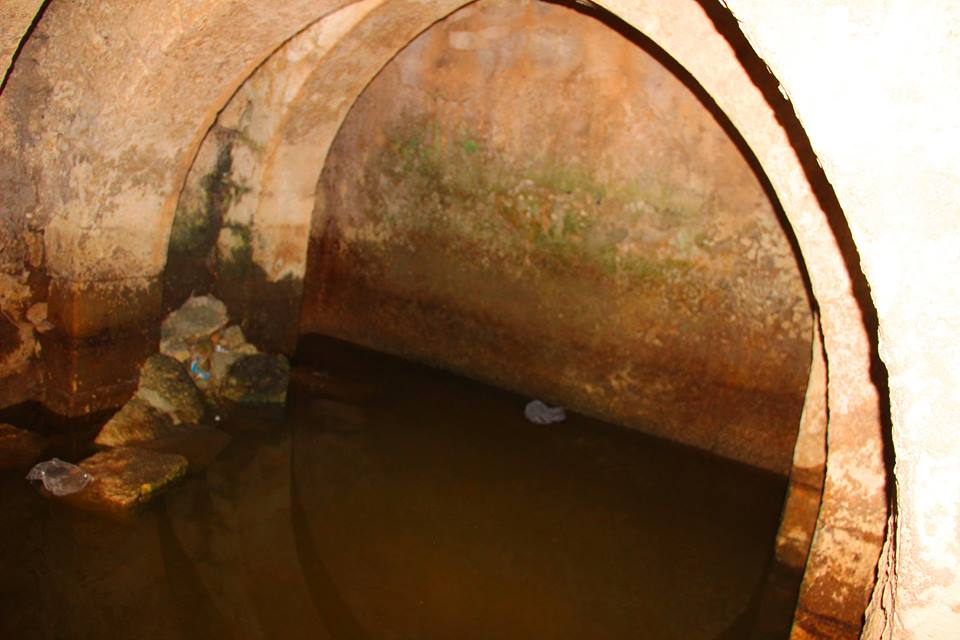

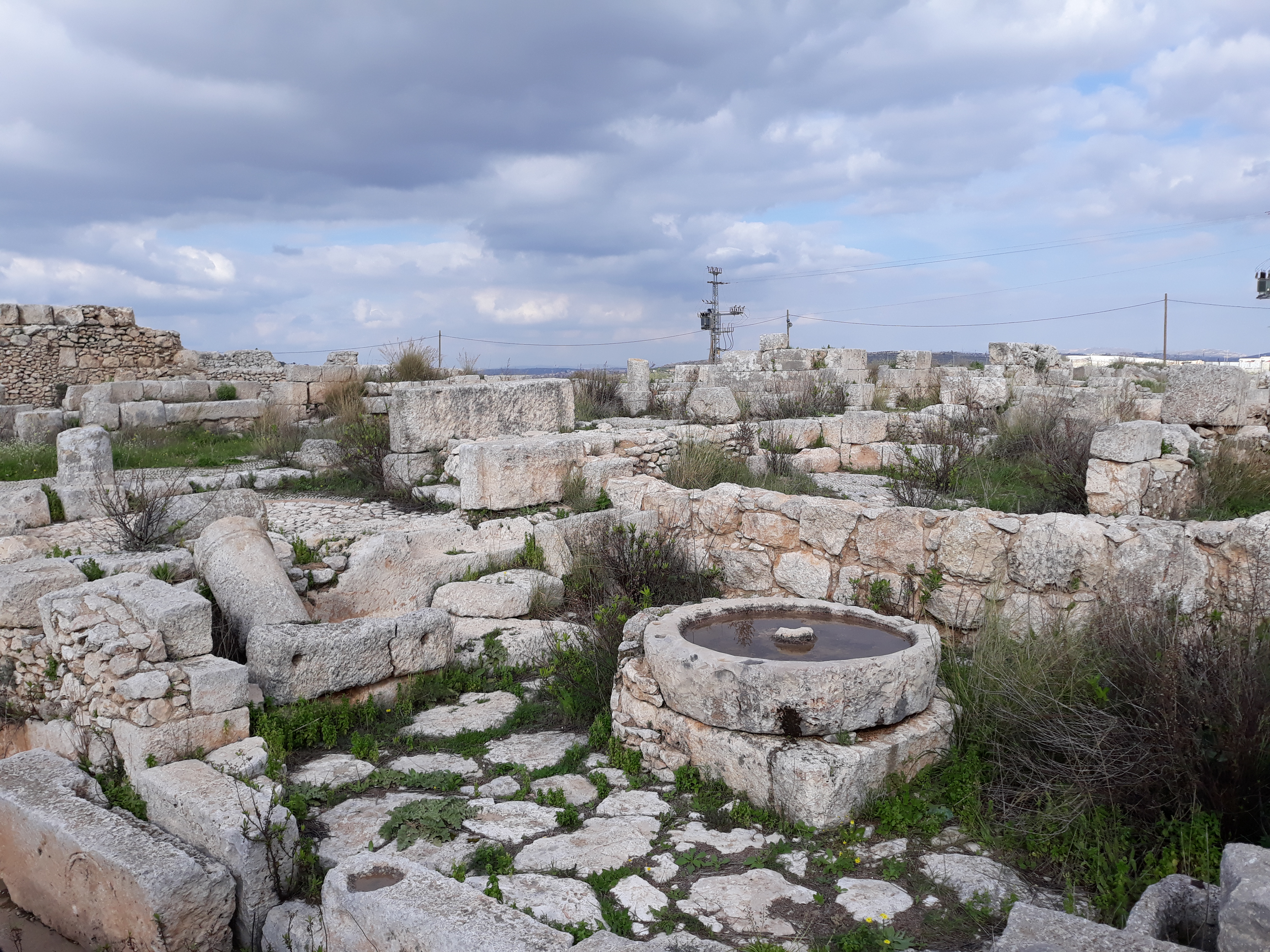
