= Rafat, Salfit =

Town in Salfit Governorate, West Bank

Rafat
- Municipality type D (Village council)

Arabic transcription(s)
  - Arabic: رافات
  - Latin: Rafat (official)
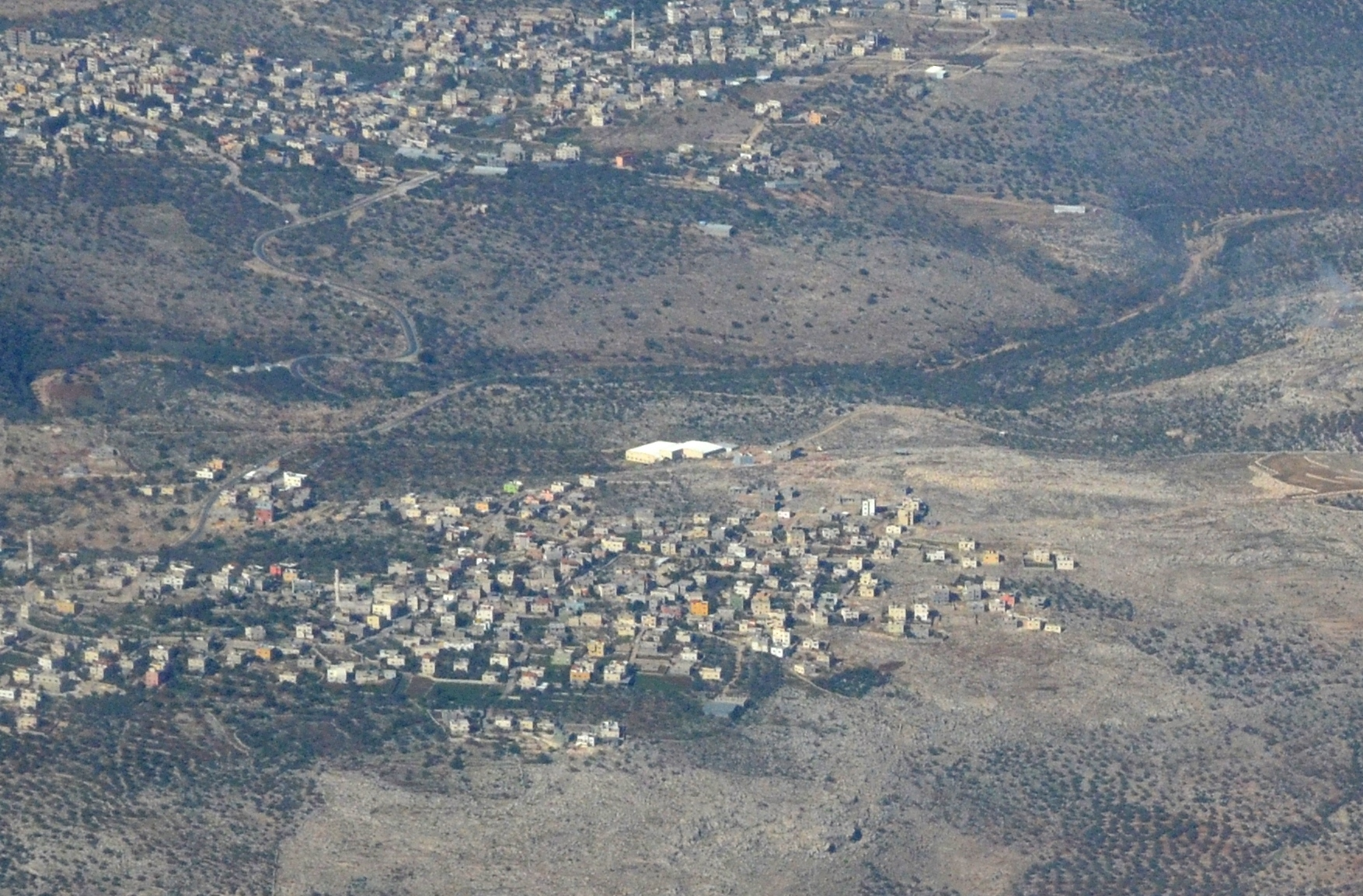
- Rafat in the front, az-Zawiya in the back

- Location of Rafat within Palestine
- Coordinates: 32°04′41″N 35°02′43″E
- Palestine grid: 154/164
- State: State of Palestine
- Governorate: Salfit

Government
  - Type: Village council
- Elevation: 293 m (961 ft)

Population (2017)
  - Total: 2,522
- Name meaning: Rafat, personal name, meaning "acts of kindness"

Rafat (Arabic: رافات) is a Palestinian town in the Salfit Governorate of the State of Palestine, in the northern West Bank, 38 kilometers southwest of Nablus. According to the Palestinian Central Bureau of Statistics, it had a population of 2,522 in 2017.

== Location ==
Rafat is 13 kilometers (8.1 mi) west of Salfit. It is south of az-Zawiya, north east of Deir Ballut, north west of Kafr ad-Dik, and east of Kafr Qasem.

== History ==
Sherds from the Iron Age II, Persian, Hellenistic/Roman, Byzantine, Crusader/Ayyubid and Mamluk eras have been found here.

Three olive oil installations dating from the Iron Age have been found here, alongside a white mosaic pavement.

=== Ottoman era ===
In 1517, the village was included in the Ottoman Empire with the rest of Palestine, and potsherds from the early Ottoman period have been found here. It appeared in the 1596 tax-records as 'Arafat, located in the Nahiya of Jabal Qubal of the Liwa of Nablus. The population was 6 households, all Muslim. In addition to sporadic income and a fixed tax for residents of the Nablus region, they paid a fixed tax rate of 33.3% on agricultural products like wheat, barley, summer crops, olive trees, goats, and beehives; a total of 3,100 akçe.

In the 18th and 19th centuries, Rafat formed part of the highland region known as Jūrat ‘Amra or Bilād Jammā‘īn. It was situated between Dayr Ghassāna in the south, and Majdal Yābā, Jammā‘īn, Mardā and Kifl Ḥāris in the east. According to historian Roy Marom, it served as a buffer zone between Jerusalem and Nablus, and suffered from instability due to the migration of Bedouin tribes and infighting among local clans for the right to collect taxes on behalf of the Ottoman authorities."

In 1838, Rafat was described as a Muslim village in Jurat Merda, south of Nablus. The area was dotted by ruins.

In 1870, Victor Guérin found a number of ancient cisterns, a rectangular birket cut in the rock measuring 15 paces long by 10 broad, and several tombs. In 1870/1871 (1288 AH), an Ottoman census listed the village in the nahiya (sub-district) of Jamma'in al-Thani, subordinate to Nablus. In 1882, the PEF's Survey of Western Palestine (SWP) described Rafat as "a semi-ruinous stone village on a ridge, apparently an ancient site, with a very conspicuous Mukam on a piece of rock west of the village, and rock-cut tombs. The water supply is from wells and cisterns." They further noted: "On the north-west of the village is a steep rocky descent, in which are two tombs of the kind called 'rock-sunk', one of which is cut in a square block of rock, the top of which is levelled."

=== British Mandate era ===
In the 1922 census of Palestine conducted by the British Mandate authorities, Rafat had a population of 92, all Muslim, increasing in the 1931 census to 127, still all Muslim, in a total of 31 houses.

In the 1945 statistics the population of Rafat was 180, all Muslims, while the total land area was 8,125 dunams, according to an official land and population survey. Of this, 1,889 dunams were used for cereals, while 24 dunams were classified as built-up (urban) areas.

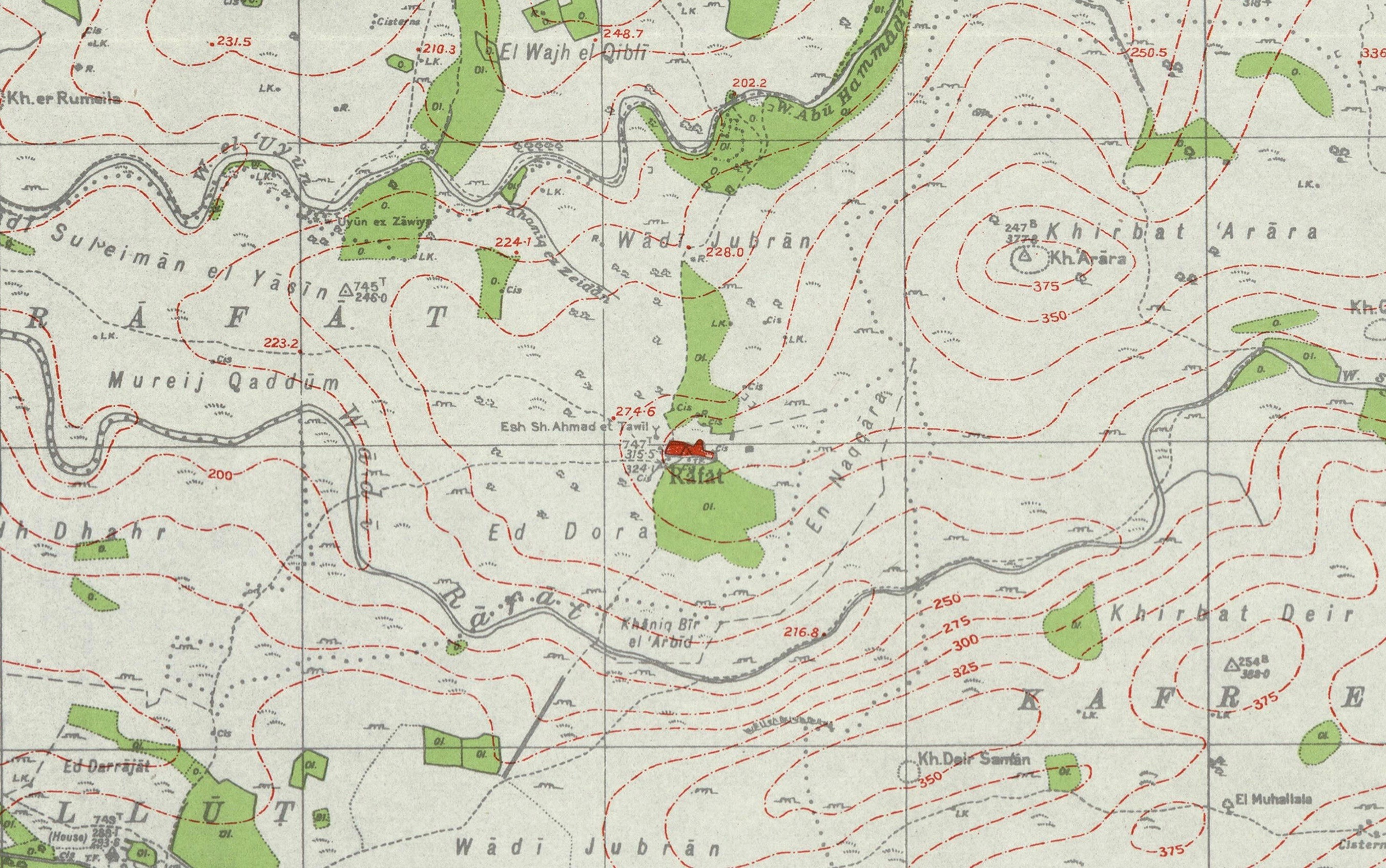
Rafat 1943 1:20,000

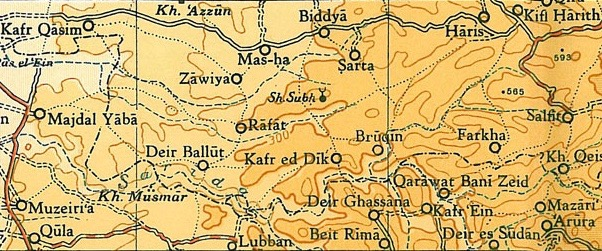
Rafat 1945 1:250,000

=== Jordanian era ===
In the wake of the 1948 Arab–Israeli War, and after the 1949 Armistice Agreements, Rafat came under Jordanian rule.

In 1961, the population was 375.

=== Post-1967 ===
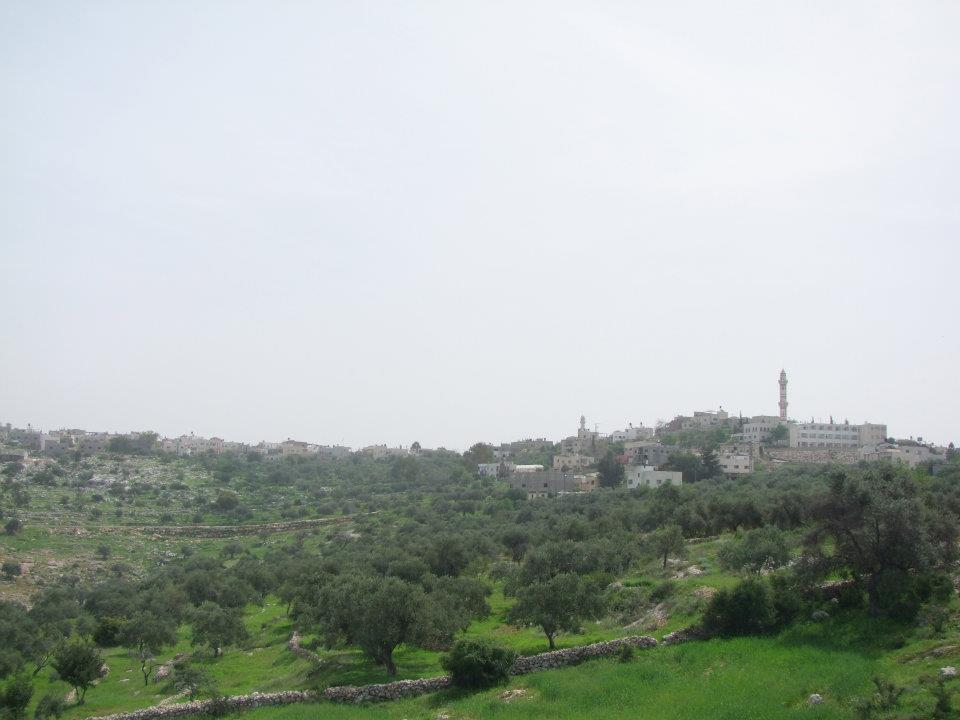
Rafat

Since the Six-Day War in 1967, Rafat has been under Israeli occupation.

After the 1995 accords, 7.5% of the village land was classified as Area B, the remaining 92.5% as Area C. According to ARIJ, Israel has confiscated 101 dunams of land from Rafat and land from Zawiya for the Israeli quarry of "Mazor Atiqa". This quarry is now on the Israeli side of the separation wall, and Israel exports 94% of the materials extracted from it to Israel. This in a clear violation of the international law, which does not permit any civil occupation to exploit natural resources in occupied territories for their economic favour.

== Notable people ==
- Yahya Ayyash

== Bibliography ==
- Barron, J.B., ed. (1923). Palestine: Report and General Abstracts of the Census of 1922. Government of Palestine.
- Conder, C.R.; Kitchener, H.H. (1882). The Survey of Western Palestine: Memoirs of the Topography, Orography, Hydrography, and Archaeology. Vol. 2. London: Committee of the Palestine Exploration Fund.
- Dauphin, C. (1998). La Palestine byzantine, Peuplement et Populations. BAR International Series 726 (in French). Vol. III : Catalogue. Oxford: Archeopress. ISBN 0-860549-05-4.
- Finkelstein, I.; Lederman, Zvi, eds. (1997). Highlands of many cultures. Vol. 1. Tel Aviv: Institute of Archaeology of Tel Aviv University Publications Section. ISBN 965-440-007-3.
- Government of Jordan, Department of Statistics (1964). First Census of Population and Housing. Volume I: Final Tables; General Characteristics of the Population (PDF).
- Government of Palestine, Department of Statistics (1945). Village Statistics, April, 1945.
- Guérin, V. (1875). Description Géographique Historique et Archéologique de la Palestine (in French). Vol. 2: Samarie, pt. 2. Paris: L'Imprimerie Nationale.
- Hadawi, S. (1970). Village Statistics of 1945: A Classification of Land and Area ownership in Palestine. Palestine Liberation Organization Research Center.
- Hütteroth, W.-D.; Abdulfattah, K. (1977). Historical Geography of Palestine, Transjordan and Southern Syria in the Late 16th Century. Erlanger Geographische Arbeiten, Sonderband 5. Erlangen, Germany: Vorstand der Fränkischen Geographischen Gesellschaft. ISBN 3-920405-41-2.
- Mills, E., ed. (1932). Census of Palestine 1931. Population of Villages, Towns and Administrative Areas. Jerusalem: Government of Palestine.
- Palmer, E.H. (1881). The Survey of Western Palestine: Arabic and English Name Lists Collected During the Survey by Lieutenants Conder and Kitchener, R. E. Transliterated and Explained by E.H. Palmer. Committee of the Palestine Exploration Fund.
- Robinson, E.; Smith, E. (1841). Biblical Researches in Palestine, Mount Sinai and Arabia Petraea: A Journal of Travels in the year 1838. Vol. 3. Boston: Crocker & Brewster.
