= Peduel =

Israeli settlement in the West Bank

Peduel: פְּדוּאֵל (Hebrew)
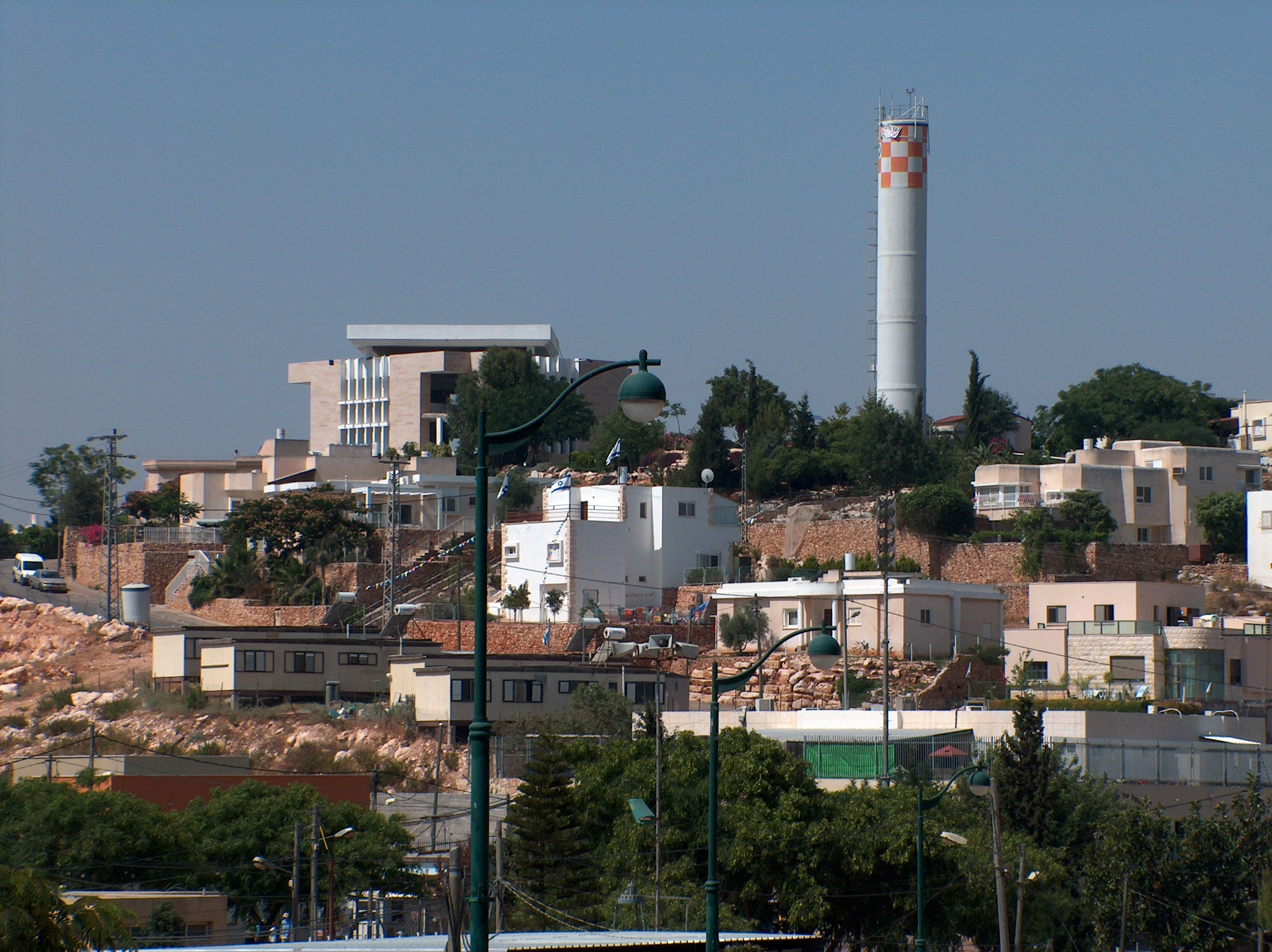
- Etymology: Ransomed by God
- Location within the Central West Bank
- Coordinates: 32°3′45″N 35°3′7″E
- Country: Palestine
- District: Judea and Samaria Area
- Council: Shomron
- Region: West Bank
- Affiliation: Hapoel HaMizrachi
- Founded: 1984
- Population (2024): 2,220

Peduel (Hebrew: פְּדוּאֵל) is an Israeli settlement in the West Bank. Located about 10 kilometres (6.2 mi) from the Palestinian city of Burqin, 25 kilometres (16 mi) east of Tel Aviv and adjacent to Alei Zahav, Beit Aryeh-Ofarim and Brukhin, it is organised as a community settlement and falls under the jurisdiction of Shomron Regional Council. In 2024 it had a population of 2,220. The Shilo Stream passes to the south, and the Shilo Stream Nature Preserve borders Peduel on the north and west.

The international community considers Israeli settlements in the West Bank illegal under international law, but the Israeli government disputes this.

== History ==
Founded in 1984 on state lands by a group of Orthodox Jewish Israelis from Yeshivat Har Etzion in Alon Shvut with help from Amana, the yishuv is now home to about 200 families. The town's name is symbolic and is derived from the bible: "And the ransomed of the Lord shall return, and come with singing unto Zion" (Isaiah 35:10 and 51:11). The word ransomed in Hebrew is "Pedui", and Pedu-el means "ransomed by God".

On 25 March, during the 2026 Iran War, a large section of a variant of an Iranian Shahab-3 medium-range ballistic missile, identified as either a Emad or Ghadr-110, landed in a schoolyard in Peduel.

== Education ==
There are many institutions located on the settlement: a nursery, three kindergartens, an elementary school, a talmud torah, and the combined pre-army and hesder Eretz Hatzvi yeshiva.
