= Kafr Zibad =

- Municipality type C

Arabic transcription(s)
  - Arabic: كفر زيباد
- Location of Kafr Zibad within Palestine
- Coordinates: 32°13′27″N 35°04′16″E
- Palestine grid: 156/181
- State: State of Palestine
- Governorate: Tulkarm

Government
  - Type: Municipality

Population (2017)
  - Total: 1,219

Kafr Zibad (Arabic: كفر زيباد) is a Palestinian village in the Tulkarm Governorate in the western part of the West Bank, located 17 kilometers south of Tulkarm.

== Name ==
The name of Kafr Zibad is thought to be originally from Zabad, its Semite name which means generosity. E. H. Palmer noted that the name meant the village of Zebed, and suggested to connect it with Zebedee, a Hebrew name.

== History ==
Archeological findings from Kafr Zibad include potsherds from the Byzantine period and a relief of a six-armed menorah.

=== Ottoman era ===
Kafr Zibad was incorporated into the Ottoman Empire in 1517 with all of Palestine, and in 1596 it appeared under that name in the tax registers as being in the Nahiya of Bani Sa'b of the Liwa of Nablus. It had a population of 50 households, all Muslims. The villagers paid a fixed tax rate of 33.3% on various agricultural products, such as wheat, barley, summer crops, olive trees, goats and/or beehives, in addition to "occasional revenues" and a press for olive oil or grape syrup; a total of 10,280 akçe.

In 1838, Robinson noted Kefr Zibad as a village in Beni Sa'ab district, west of Nablus.

In the 1860s, the Ottoman authorities granted the village an agricultural plot of land called Ghabat Kafr Zibad in the former confines of the Forest of Arsur (Ar. Al-Ghaba) in the coastal plain, west of the village. This formed the nucleus for the later village of Khirbat al-Zababida, founded by Kafr Zibad's residents.

In 1870/1871 (1288 AH), an Ottoman census listed the village in the nahiya (sub-district) of Bani Sa'b.

In 1882, the PEF's Survey of Western Palestine noted at Kafr Zibad: "A village of moderate size on a small plateau, overhanging the valley on the north of it. It is of stone. A steep ascent, with a cistern on the north, on the south a fig-garden, and beyond this a few olives, where the tents of the Survey party were pitched. Near them was a rock-cut tomb. The water supply is from cisterns."

=== British Mandate era ===
In the 1922 census of Palestine conducted by the British Mandate authorities, Kufr Zaibad had a population of 260 Muslims, increasing in the 1931 census to 469 Muslims, in 96 houses.

In the 1945 statistics the population of Kafr Zibad was 1,590 Muslims, with 7,085 dunams (708.5 ha; 1,751 acres) of land according to an official land and population survey. Of this, 2,266 dunams (226.6 ha; 560 acres) were plantations and irrigable land, 1,434 dunams (143.4 ha; 354 acres) were used for cereals, while 22 dunams (2.2 ha; 5.4 acres) were built-up (urban) land.

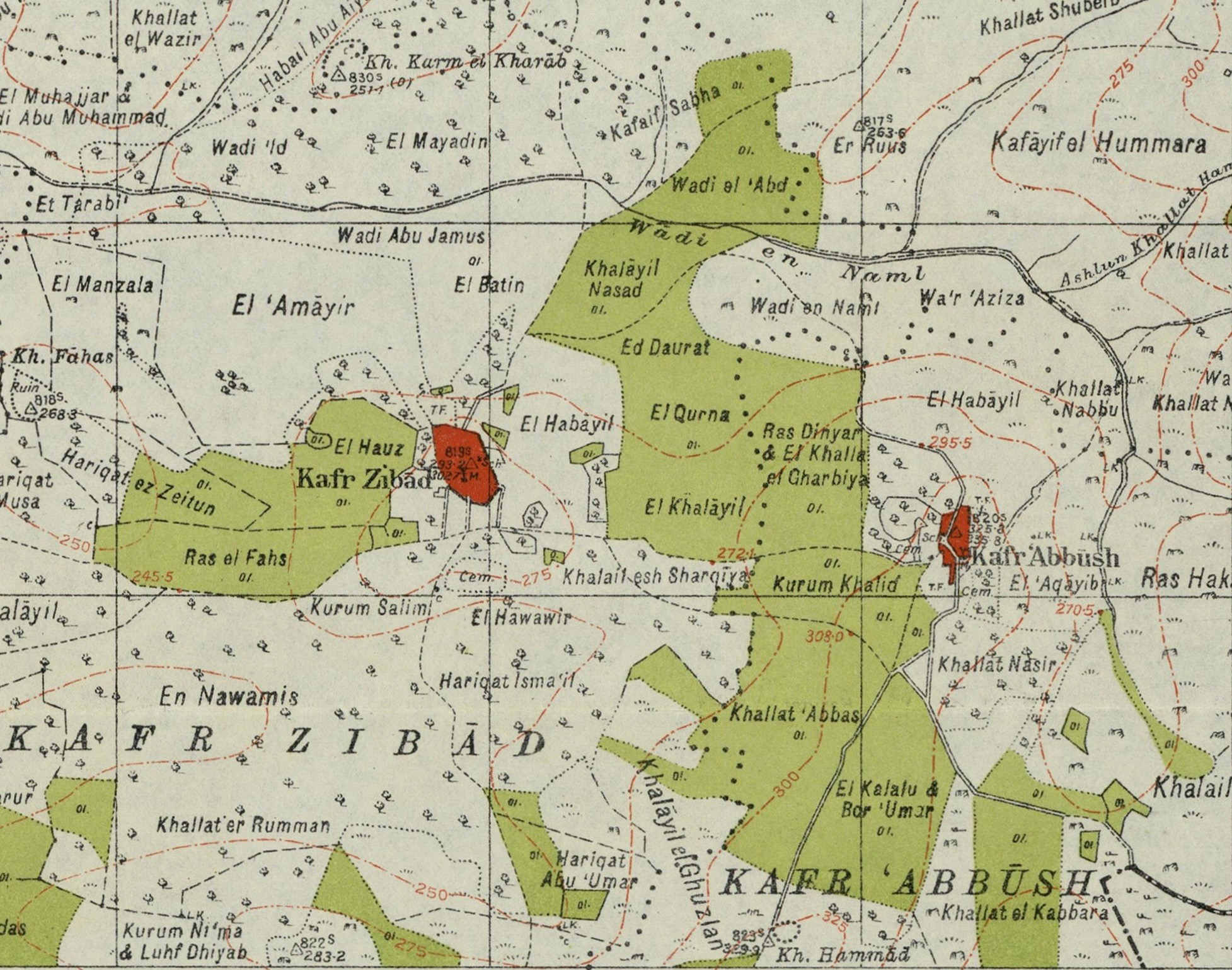
Kafr Zibad 1942 1:20,000

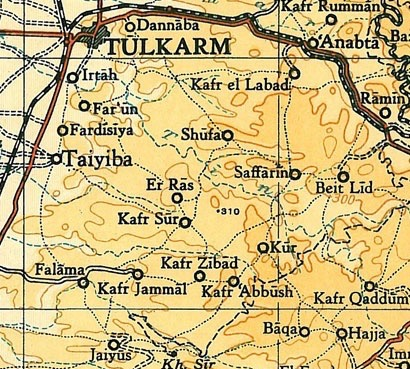
Kafr Zibad 1945 1:250,000

=== Jordanian era ===
In the wake of the 1948 Arab–Israeli War, and after the 1949 Armistice Agreements, Kafr Zibad came under Jordanian rule.

In 1961, the population of Kafr Zibad was 643.

=== Post 1967 ===
After the Six-Day War in 1967, Kafr Zibad came under Israeli occupation.

19% of the population of Kafr Zibad were refugees in 1991. The healthcare and education facilities for the surrounding villages are based in Kafr Zibad, Kafr Zibad secondary school being one of the best schools in the region. There is a historical mosque dated to the times of Caliph Omar Ibn al-Khattab, and there are a police center and sport club. The facilities are designated as MOH level 2.

Kafr Zibad had a population of approximately 1,306 inhabitants in mid-year 2006 and 1,219 and 2017.

After Israel built the Israeli West Bank barrier, 175 acres (710 dunams; 71 ha) of irrigated land owned by Kafr Zibad villagers was isolated behind the barrier. Access to this land is dependent on Israeli cumbersome permitting process.

== Bibliography ==
- Barron, J. B., ed. (1923). Palestine: Report and General Abstracts of the Census of 1922. Government of Palestine.
- Conder, C.R.; Kitchener, H.H. (1882). The Survey of Western Palestine: Memoirs of the Topography, Orography, Hydrography, and Archaeology. Vol. 2. London: Committee of the Palestine Exploration Fund.
- Dauphin, C. (1998). La Palestine byzantine, Peuplement et Populations. BAR International Series 726 (in French). Vol. III : Catalogue. Oxford: Archeopress. ISBN 0-860549-05-4.
- Government of Jordan, Department of Statistics (1964). First Census of Population and Housing. Volume I: Final Tables; General Characteristics of the Population (PDF).
- Government of Palestine, Department of Statistics (1945). Village Statistics, April, 1945.
- Hadawi, S. (1970). Village Statistics of 1945: A Classification of Land and Area ownership in Palestine. Palestine Liberation Organization Research Center.
- Hütteroth, W.-D.; Abdulfattah, K. (1977). Historical Geography of Palestine, Transjordan and Southern Syria in the Late 16th Century. Erlanger Geographische Arbeiten, Sonderband 5. Erlangen, Germany: Vorstand der Fränkischen Geographischen Gesellschaft. ISBN 3-920405-41-2.
- Mills, E., ed. (1932). Census of Palestine 1931. Population of Villages, Towns and Administrative Areas. Jerusalem: Government of Palestine.
- Palmer, E.H. (1881). The Survey of Western Palestine: Arabic and English Name Lists Collected During the Survey by Lieutenants Conder and Kitchener, R. E. Transliterated and Explained by E.H. Palmer. Committee of the Palestine Exploration Fund.
- Robinson, E.; Smith, E. (1841). Biblical Researches in Palestine, Mount Sinai and Arabia Petraea: A Journal of Travels in the year 1838. Vol. 3. Boston: Crocker & Brewster.
