= Neveh Erez =

- Location within the Central West Bank
- Coordinates: 31.865°N 35.3117°E
- Country: Palestine
- District: Judea and Samaria Area
- Council: Mateh Binyamin
- Region: West Bank
- Founded: 1999

Neveh Erez (Hebrew: נווה ארז, lit. 'Erez Home'), also known as Mitzpe Erez (Hebrew: מצפה ארז, lit. 'Erez Lookout'), is an Israeli outpost in the West Bank. Located near Ma'ale Mikhmas, it falls under the jurisdiction of the Mateh Binyamin Regional Council. It is home to around eight families.

Israeli outposts are illegal under Israeli law. The international community further considers all Israeli settlements, including outposts, in the West Bank illegal under international law, but the Israeli government disputes this.

== History ==
The outpost was established in 1999 and was named after Erez Gerstein, an IDF commander killed in Lebanon. However, later in the year the Yesha Council made an agreement with then Prime Minister Ehud Barak to dismantle a number of illegal outposts, among them Neveh Erez. In October of that year residents from Neveh Erez and Mitzpe Hagit moved to Mitzpe Dani, planning to remain there until permits allowing them to return were issued. The outpost was made permanent in 2001.
