= Mukhmas =

- Municipality type D (Village council)

Arabic transcription(s)
  - Arabic: مُخماس
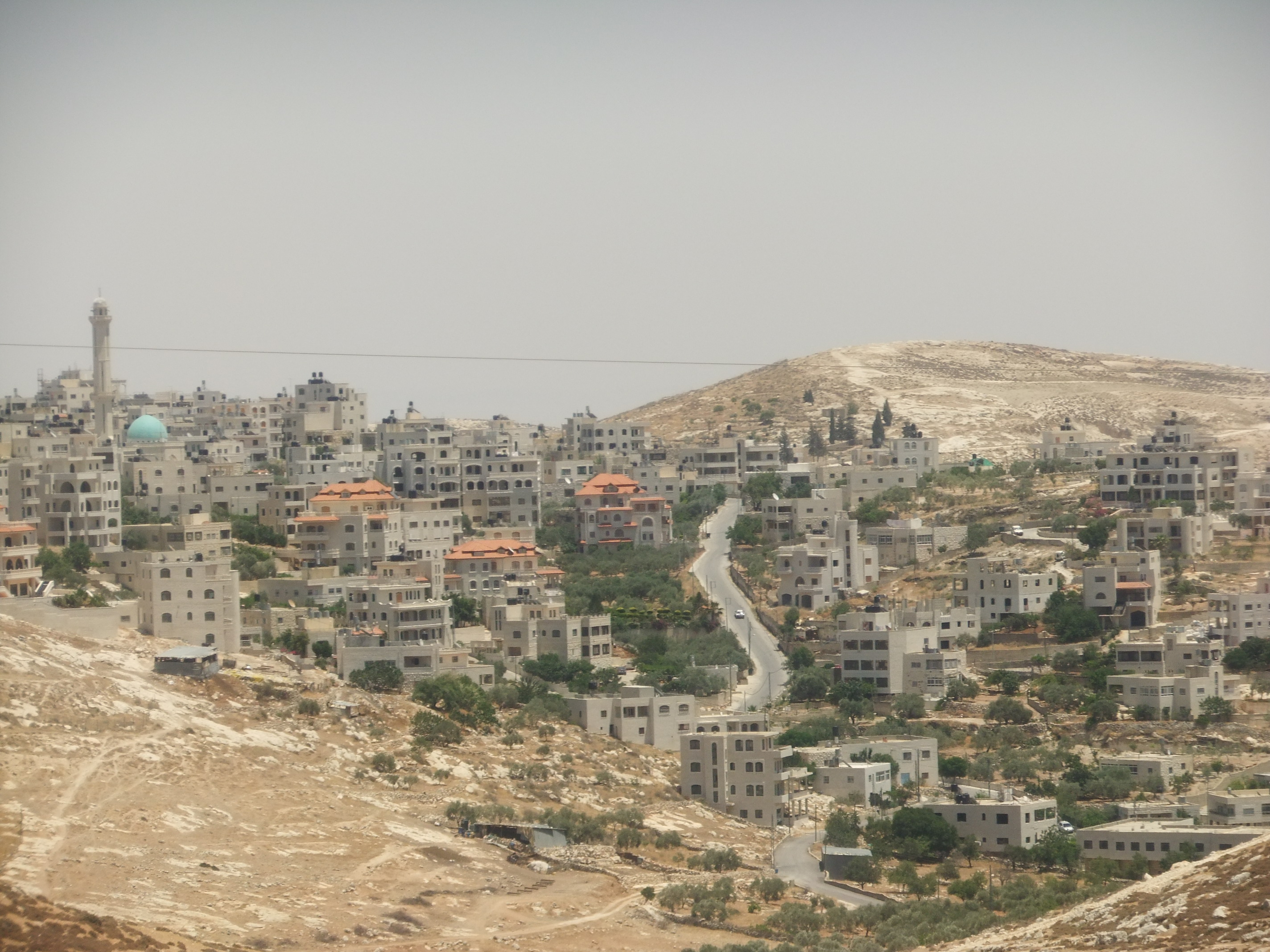
- Mikhmas from the west

- Location of Mukhmas within Palestine
- Coordinates: 31°52′22″N 35°16′37″E
- Palestine grid: 176/142
- State: State of Palestine
- Governorate: Quds

Government
  - Type: Village council

Population (2017)
  - Total: 1,363
- Name meaning: Michmash

Mukhmas (Note: Mujmas in the Spanish transcriptions) (Arabic: مُخماس) is a Palestinian village in the Jerusalem Governorate, located northeast of Jerusalem, in the center of the West Bank. According to the Palestinian Central Bureau of Statistics, the town had a population of 1,363 in 2017.

During the early Ottoman period, it was a Muslim village with a population engaged in agriculture. Following the Oslo Accords, Mukhmas' jurisdiction, now under the Palestinian Authority, is divided between Areas B and C.

== Location ==
Mikhmas is located 11.2 kilometers (7.0 mi) (horizontally) on the highlands north-east of Jerusalem. It is bordered by Deir Dibwan to the north, Burqa to the west, and Jaba' to the south. The Israeli settlement Ma'ale Mikhmas lies to the east.

== History ==
=== Antiquity ===
Mukhmas is identified with the ancient town of Michmas, and the modern Arabic name preserves the ancient Hebrew name. Its ruins can be found at Khirbet el-Hara el-Fauqa, an archaeological site at the northern edge of the village. Another archeological site, Khirbet ed-Dawwara, a small Iron Age I Israelite ruin dating back to the 11th-10th century BCE, is situated 1.5 km southeast of the village.

Michmas is also mentioned in classical period sources. It was the seat of Jonathan Apphus until 152 BC. According to the Mishnah, Michmas was known for providing fine flour as a gift offering to the Temple in Jerusalem.

Four clusters of tombs including as many as 70 burial caves dating from the Second Temple period were discovered in Mukhmas during the 1980s. On the entrance to one of the caves, a drawing of a seven-branched menorah was found, alongside an inscription written in the Paleo-Hebrew script. Other findings from Mukhmas include an ossuary which bears the name ‘Shimeon L[evi]’ in the Hebrew alphabet. These findings led archeologists to believe that Mukhmas was a Jewish priestly settlement which was populated up until Bar-Kokhba revolt in the early 2nd century CE.

=== Byzantine period ===
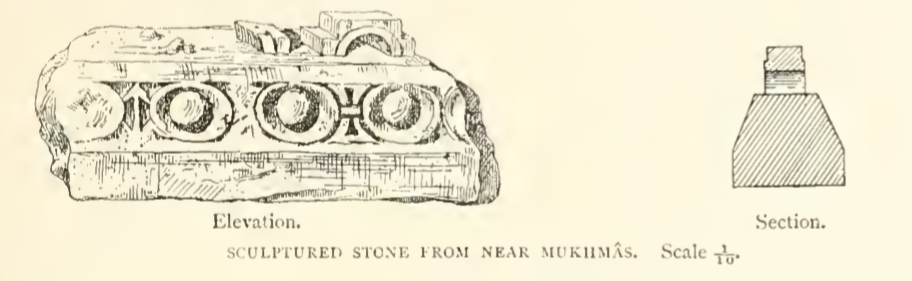
Byzantine remains found by Clermont-Ganneau in Mukhmas

Ceramics from the Byzantine era have been found in Mukhmas. Clermont-Ganneau also found Byzantine remains here, speculating that they might be from the convent found by abbot Firminus, a disciple of St. Sabas. The SWP noted about Mikhmas: "In the village are remains of old masonry, apparendy a church. A pillar-shaft is built into a wall in the north-west corner of the village. Two lintel stones are built over the door of another house, one with three crosses in circles, the second with a design apparently cut in half."

=== Ottoman era ===
Mukhmas was incorporated into the Ottoman Empire in 1517 with all of Palestine, and in 1596 it appeared in the tax registers as being in the nahiya of Al-Quds in the liwa of Al-Quds under the name of Mihmas. It had a population of 24 household; who were all Muslims. They paid a fixed Ziamet tax-rate of 33.3% on agricultural products, including wheat, barley, olive trees, fruit trees, goats and beehives, in addition to occasional revenues; a total of 2,200 akçe.

In 1838, it was noted as a Muslim village, Mukhmas, located in the area immediately north of Jerusalem.

In 1863, Victor Guérin observed a great number of sizeable antique stones in the modern houses. About thirty cisterns and silos dug in the rock also dated back to antiquity. An Ottoman village list of about 1870 showed that Muchmas had 36 houses and a population of 120, though the population count included only men.

Clermont-Ganneau visited Mukhmas in 1873 and documented the local funeral traditions. He also mentioned a local maqam named Sultan Ibrahim, alongside rock-cut tombs, irregularly shaped caves, and remnants of hewn stones and sculptures.

In 1883 the PEF's Survey of Western Palestine (SWP) described Mukhmas as: "A small stone village on the slope of a ridge. The houses are poor and scattered. The water supply is from cisterns. It has a well to the east, and some scattered figs to the west. On the north are rock-cut tombs; an ancient road leads past the place. There are foundations and remains of former buildings in the village; on the south a steep slope leads clown to the great valley, Wadi es-Suweinit. This place is the ancient Michmash, which is placed by the Onomasticon 9 Roman miles from Jerusalem. The distance is 7 1/2 English or 8 Roman miles in a line."

In 1896 the population of Muchmas was estimated to be about 288 persons.

=== British Mandate era ===
In the 1922 census of Palestine conducted by the British Mandate authorities, Mukhmas had a population of 361, increasing in the 1931 census to 404 inhabitants, in 80 houses.

In the 1945 statistics, Mukhmas had a population of 540 Muslims, and a land area of 13,479 dunams. Of this, 569 dunams were designated for plantations and irrigable land, 2,274 for cereals, while 28 dunams were built-up (urban) land.

=== Jordanian era ===
In the wake of the 1948 Arab–Israeli War, and after the 1949 Armistice Agreements, Mukhmas came under Jordanian rule.

The Jordanian census of 1961 found 774 inhabitants.

=== Post 1967 ===
After the Six-Day War in 1967, Mukhmas has been under Israeli occupation. After the 1995 accords, 6.4% of the village land was classified as Area B, the remaining 93.6% as Area C.

The Israelis have confiscated land in Mukhmas for its military bases, roads, and Israeli settlements, including Sha'ar Binyamin and Ma'ale Mikhmas. According to the Palestinian Central Bureau of Statistics, the town had a population of 1,878 in 2006. In 2010, Israeli Settlers from Ofra and Migron uprooted several hundred olive trees owned by the people of Mukhmas.

Israeli settlers from the "Hilltop Youth" movement throwing stones at reformist rabbi Arik Ascherman, in Mukhmas in the occupied West Bank, on December 21, 2025

The village is subject to settler attacks, invasion of fields and pastures, destruction of trees and violence against residents. The Israeli authorities do not intervene to prevent these attacks and security personnel were witnessed participating in such attacks. In 2011, Israeli settlers from the nearby settlement of Ma'ale Mikhmas set fire to about a hundred olive trees belonging to the people of Mukhmas. in 2017 310 olive trees were uprooted.

On 17 January 2026, masked Israeli settlers attacked Bedouin community in the eastern outskirt of the village, injuring two Palestinians, burning four residential structures, and displacing a family. The Settlers broke into a home while family members was inside, sprayed them with pepper spray, beat them with clubs and set the structure on fire. During the same incident, settlers also assaulted other residents and activists providing a protective presence, set fire to two vehicles, and damaged additional homes, water tanks and solar panels. In February, Israeli settlers, 'behaving like animals,' attacked the town, shooting three Palestinian, killing one Palestinian-American teenager. Among the settlers were the security coordinator of the Neve Erez outpost and right-wing activist Elisha Yered.

A settler attacks peace activists who try to prevent him from entering a private Palestinian field in Mukhmas. June 2024

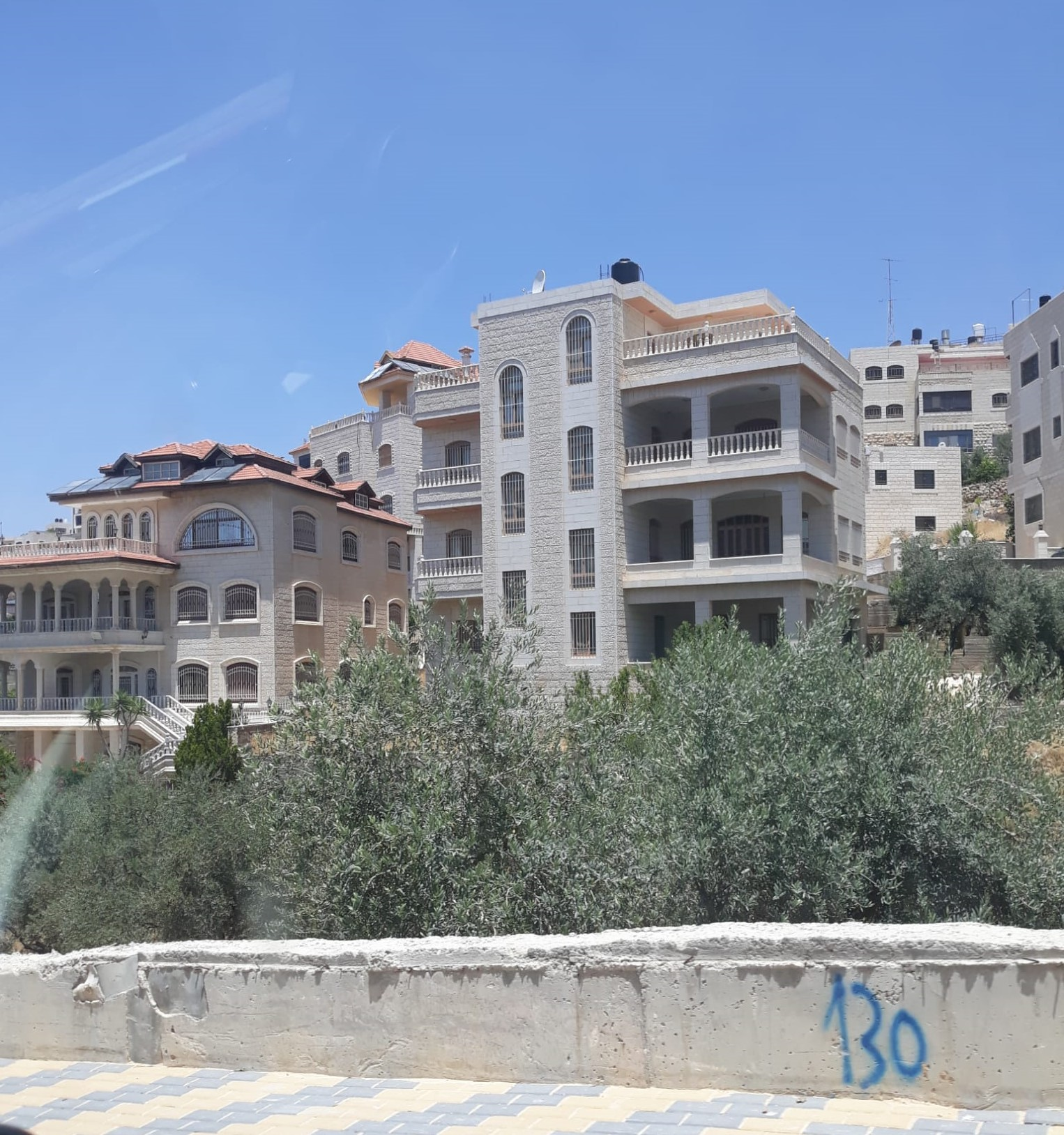
Mukhmas May 24

== Bibliography ==
- Barron, J.B., ed. (1923). Palestine: Report and General Abstracts of the Census of 1922. Government of Palestine.
- Clermont-Ganneau, C.S. (1896). [ARP] Archaeological Researches in Palestine 1873-1874, translated from the French by J. McFarlane. Vol. 2. London: Palestine Exploration Fund.
- Conder, C.R.; Kitchener, H.H. (1883). The Survey of Western Palestine: Memoirs of the Topography, Orography, Hydrography, and Archaeology. Vol. 3. London: Committee of the Palestine Exploration Fund.
- Dauphin, C. (1998). La Palestine byzantine, Peuplement et Populations. BAR International Series 726 (in French). Vol. III : Catalogue. Oxford: Archeopress. ISBN 0-860549-05-4.
- Government of Jordan, Department of Statistics (1964). First Census of Population and Housing. Volume I: Final Tables; General Characteristics of the Population (PDF).
- Government of Palestine, Department of Statistics (1945). Village Statistics, April, 1945.
- Guérin, V. (1869). Description Géographique Historique et Archéologique de la Palestine (in French). Vol. 1: Judee, pt. 3. Paris: L'Imprimerie Nationale.
- Hadawi, S. (1970). Village Statistics of 1945: A Classification of Land and Area ownership in Palestine. Palestine Liberation Organization Research Center.
- Hartmann, M. (1883). "Die Ortschaftenliste des Liwa Jerusalem in dem türkischen Staatskalender für Syrien auf das Jahr 1288 der Flucht (1871)". Zeitschrift des Deutschen Palästina-Vereins. 6: 102–149.
- Hütteroth, W.-D.; Abdulfattah, K. (1977). Historical Geography of Palestine, Transjordan and Southern Syria in the Late 16th Century. Erlanger Geographische Arbeiten, Sonderband 5. Erlangen, Germany: Vorstand der Fränkischen Geographischen Gesellschaft. ISBN 3-920405-41-2.
- Mills, E., ed. (1932). Census of Palestine 1931. Population of Villages, Towns and Administrative Areas. Jerusalem: Government of Palestine.
- Palmer, E.H. (1881). The Survey of Western Palestine: Arabic and English Name Lists Collected During the Survey by Lieutenants Conder and Kitchener, R. E. Transliterated and Explained by E.H. Palmer. Committee of the Palestine Exploration Fund.
- Robinson, E.; Smith, E. (1841). Biblical Researches in Palestine, Mount Sinai and Arabia Petraea: A Journal of Travels in the year 1838. Vol. 2. Boston: Crocker & Brewster.
- Robinson, E.; Smith, E. (1841). Biblical Researches in Palestine, Mount Sinai and Arabia Petraea: A Journal of Travels in the year 1838. Vol. 3. Boston: Crocker & Brewster.
- Schick, C. (1896). "Zur Einwohnerzahl des Bezirks Jerusalem". Zeitschrift des Deutschen Palästina-Vereins. 19: 120–127.
- Socin, A. (1879). "Alphabetisches Verzeichniss von Ortschaften des Paschalik Jerusalem". Zeitschrift des Deutschen Palästina-Vereins. 2: 135–163.
