= Hagith =

Hagith, Haggith or Hagit can refer to:

- Haggith, a Biblical character
- Hagith (opera), by Karol Szymanowski
- Hagith (spirit), the Olympian spirit in the Arbatel de magia veterum
- Hebrew female first name:
  - Hagit Borer
  - Hagit Yaso
- Mitzpe Hagit, West Bank settlement, called for a woman of that name
