= Hasmonean (disambiguation) =

The Hasmonean dynasty was the ruling house of Judea from 140–37 BCE.

Hasmonean may also refer to:

- Hasmonean Brigade, infantry unit in the Israel Defence Forces
- Hasmonean High School, secondary school in Hendon, London, England
- Hashmonaim, Israeli settlement in the West Bank
