= Ganei Modi'in =

Israeli settlement in the West Bank

Ganei Modi'in: גני מודיעין (Hebrew)
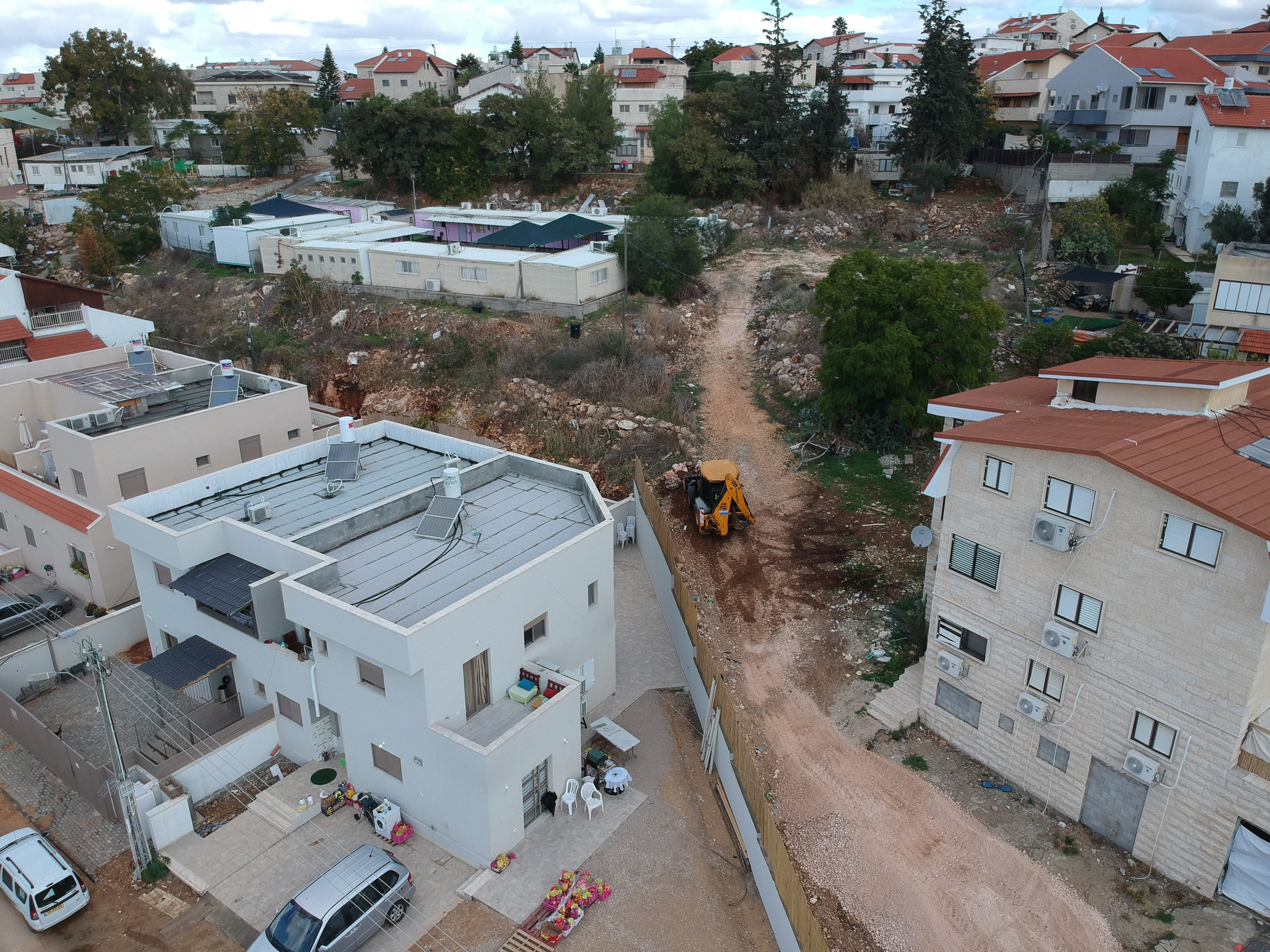
- Etymology: Modi'in Gardens
- Location within the Central West Bank Location within the West Bank
- Coordinates: 31°55′46″N 35°1′0″E
- Country: Palestine
- District: Judea and Samaria Area
- Council: Mateh Binyamin
- Region: West Bank
- Founded: March 1985
- Population (2024): 3,260

Ganei Modi'in (Hebrew: גני מודיעין, lit. 'Modi'in Gardens') is an Israeli settlement in the West Bank. Located just over the Green Line to the north of Modi'in-Maccabim-Re'ut, it falls under the jurisdiction of Mateh Binyamin Regional Council. In 2024, it had a population of 3,260.

The international community considers Israeli settlements in the West Bank illegal under international law, but the Israeli government disputes this.

== History ==
Plans to establish the settlement were announced by the regional council in 1982 and it was founded in March 1985. Originally part of Hashmonaim, in 1996 it was merged into Modi'in Illit. However, on 1 January 2016, it was officially recognised as a separate jurisdiction.
