= Psagot =

Israeli settlement in the West Bank

Psagot: פְּסָגוֹת (Hebrew)
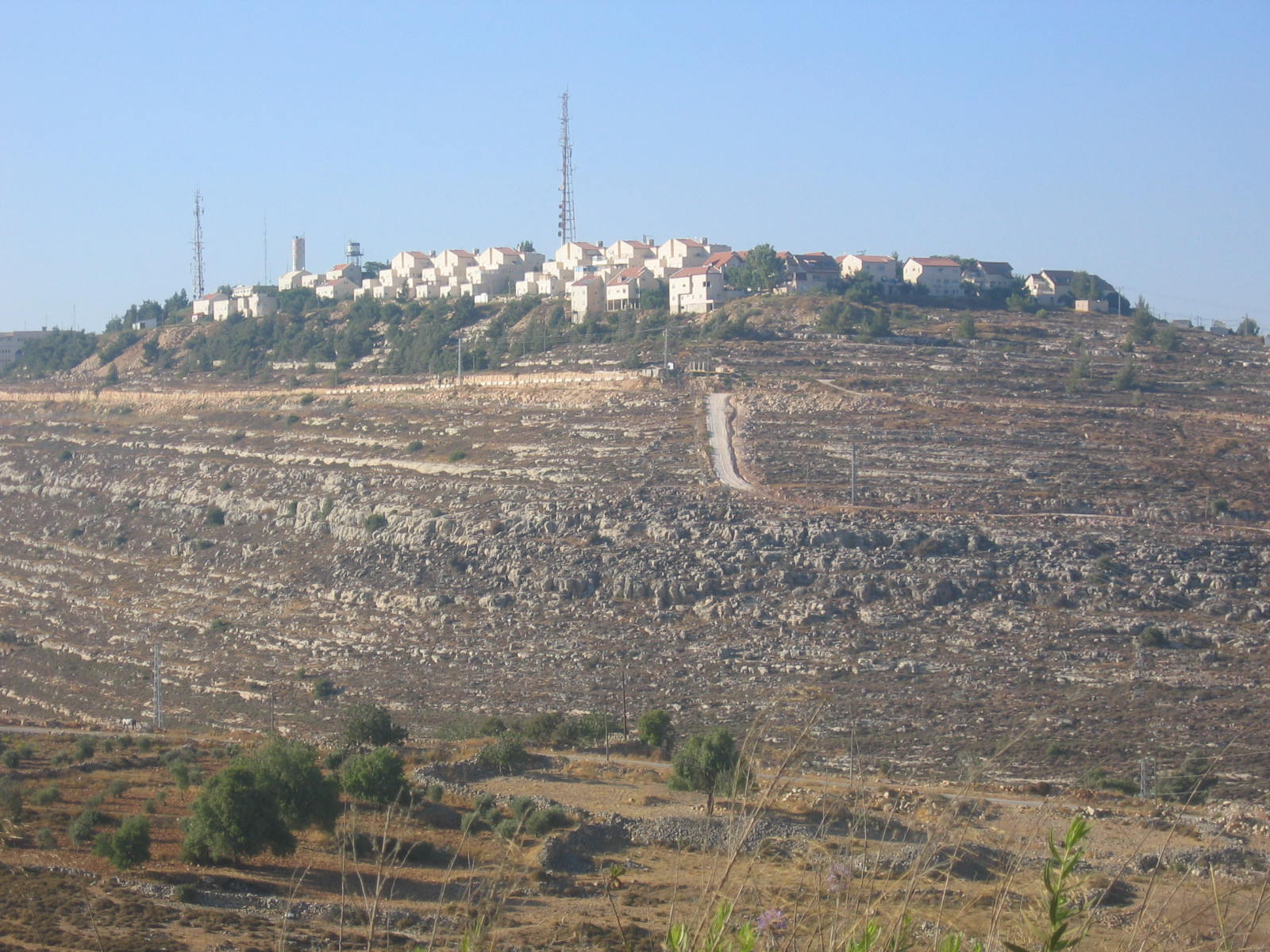

- Location within the Central West Bank
- Coordinates: 31°53′57″N 35°13′26″E
- Country: Palestine
- District: Judea and Samaria Area
- Council: Mateh Binyamin
- Region: West Bank
- Affiliation: Amana
- Founded: 1981
- Founder: Beit VeGan residents
- Population (2024): 2,298

Psagot (Hebrew: פְּסָגוֹת, lit. 'Peaks') is an Israeli settlement in the West Bank, located on Tawil hill, adjacent to the Palestinian cities of Ramallah and al-Bireh. Established in 1981, it is organised as a community settlement and falls under the jurisdiction of Binyamin Regional Council, with the council's headquarters located there. In 2024 it had a population of 2,298.

The international community considers Israeli settlements in the West Bank illegal under international law, but the Israeli government disputes this.

The Israeli Psagot Winery was established in the settlement on privately owned Palestinian land; a demolition order (COGAT Order 252/03) was issued by the Israeli authorities against the winery as, even under Israeli law, the Israeli building over privately owned land was illegal. As of 2019, the order had yet to be enforced.

== Etymology ==
The name Psagot was proposed by one of the early residents, Moshe Bar-Asher, a professor and head of the Academy of the Hebrew Language. It expresses the hope that the new village will achieve a peak in settlement and study of the Torah. The name also refers to the location of Psagot on the peak of Mount Tawil.

== History ==
The Arabic name of the hill is Jabel Tawil (long mountain).

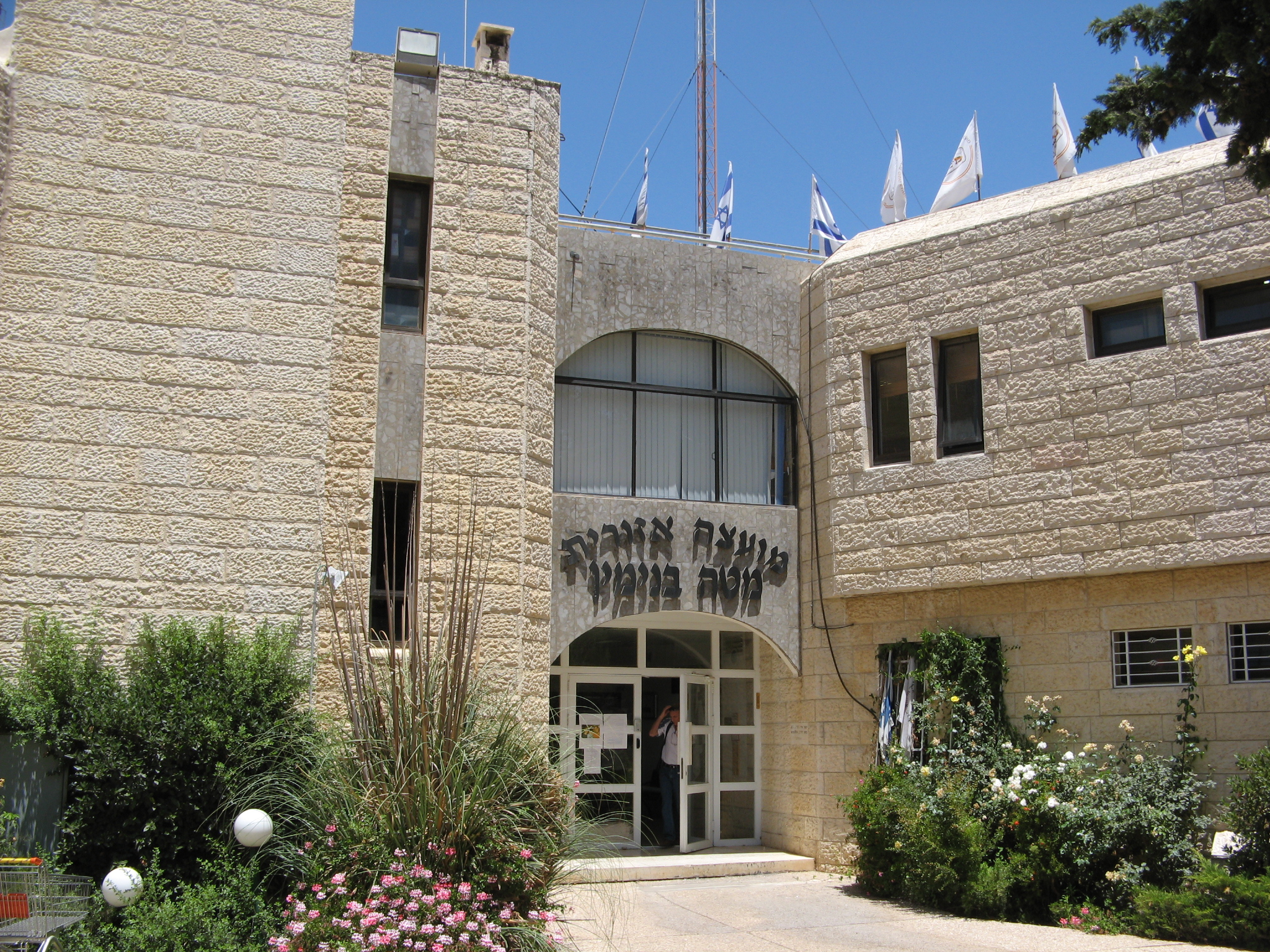
Mateh Binyamin regional council headquarters, Psagot

In the wake of the 1948 Arab–Israeli War, and after the 1949 Armistice Agreements, Jabel Tawil came under Jordanian rule. It was annexed by Jordan in 1950.

Before 1967, Jabel Tawil was known to locals as "Kuwaiti hill" because of numerous visitors from the Persian Gulf who hiked in the area. In 1964, some of the land was purchased by the Jerusalem municipality for a future tourist resort. In the Six-Day War, it came under Israeli occupation. From September 1976, Arabs were prohibited from building in the area.

According to ARIJ, Israel confiscated 780 dunams of land from the nearby Palestinian town of Al-Bireh in order to construct Psagot. There is also an archaeological site near some of the Caravillas on the hill of Psagot.

In 1981, Ariel Sharon, then Israeli Minister of Defense, told Pinchas Wallerstein, head of the Mateh Binyamin Regional Council, that he would support initiatives to settle the area. In July 1981, Wallerstein moved the council headquarters to the hill, then occupied by a military intelligence base. Five families from the Jerusalem neighborhood of Beit VeGan took up residence there. A year later, they were joined by a group from the Kerem B'Yavneh yeshiva who came to create a kollel.

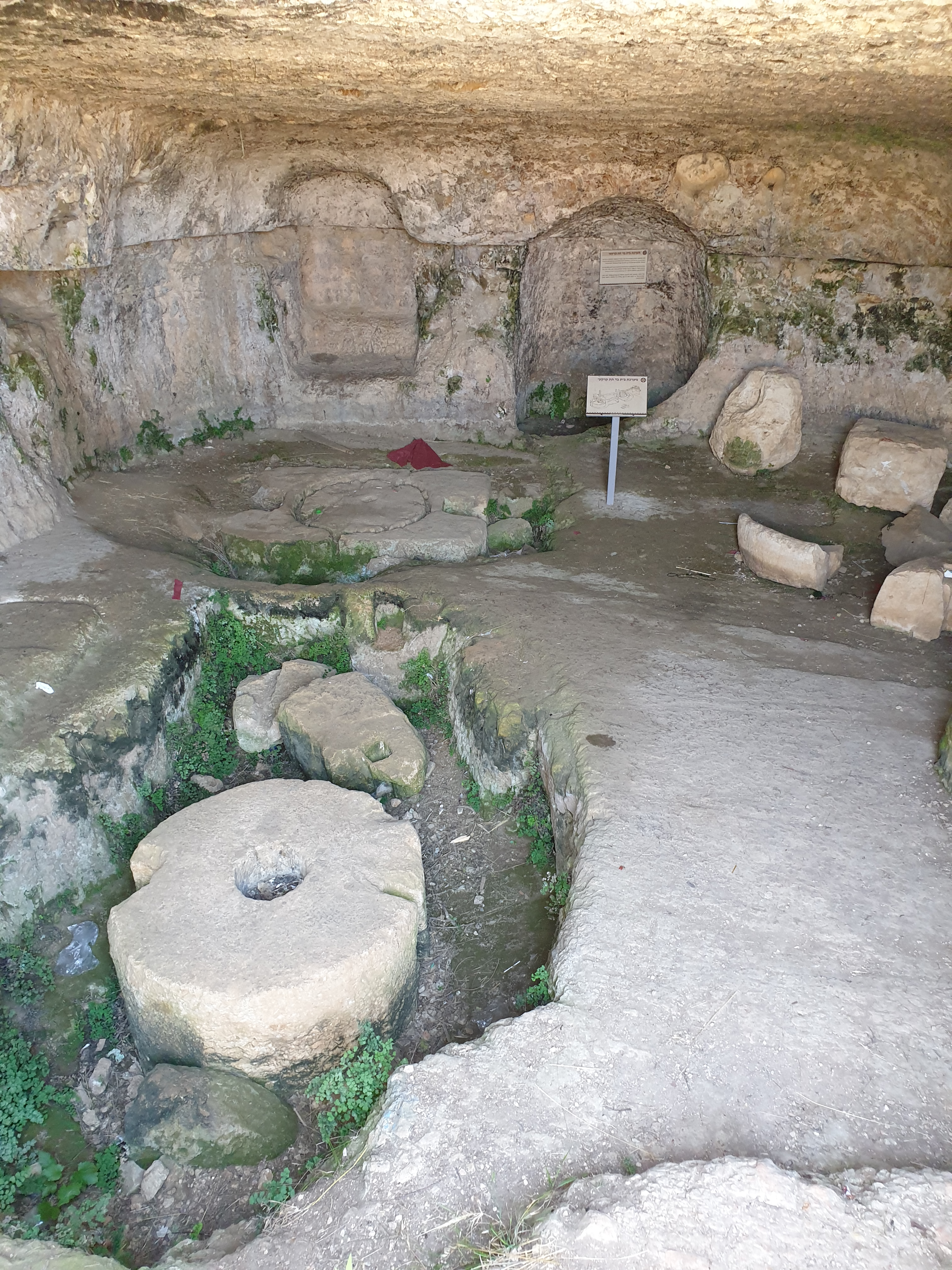
An underground oil press

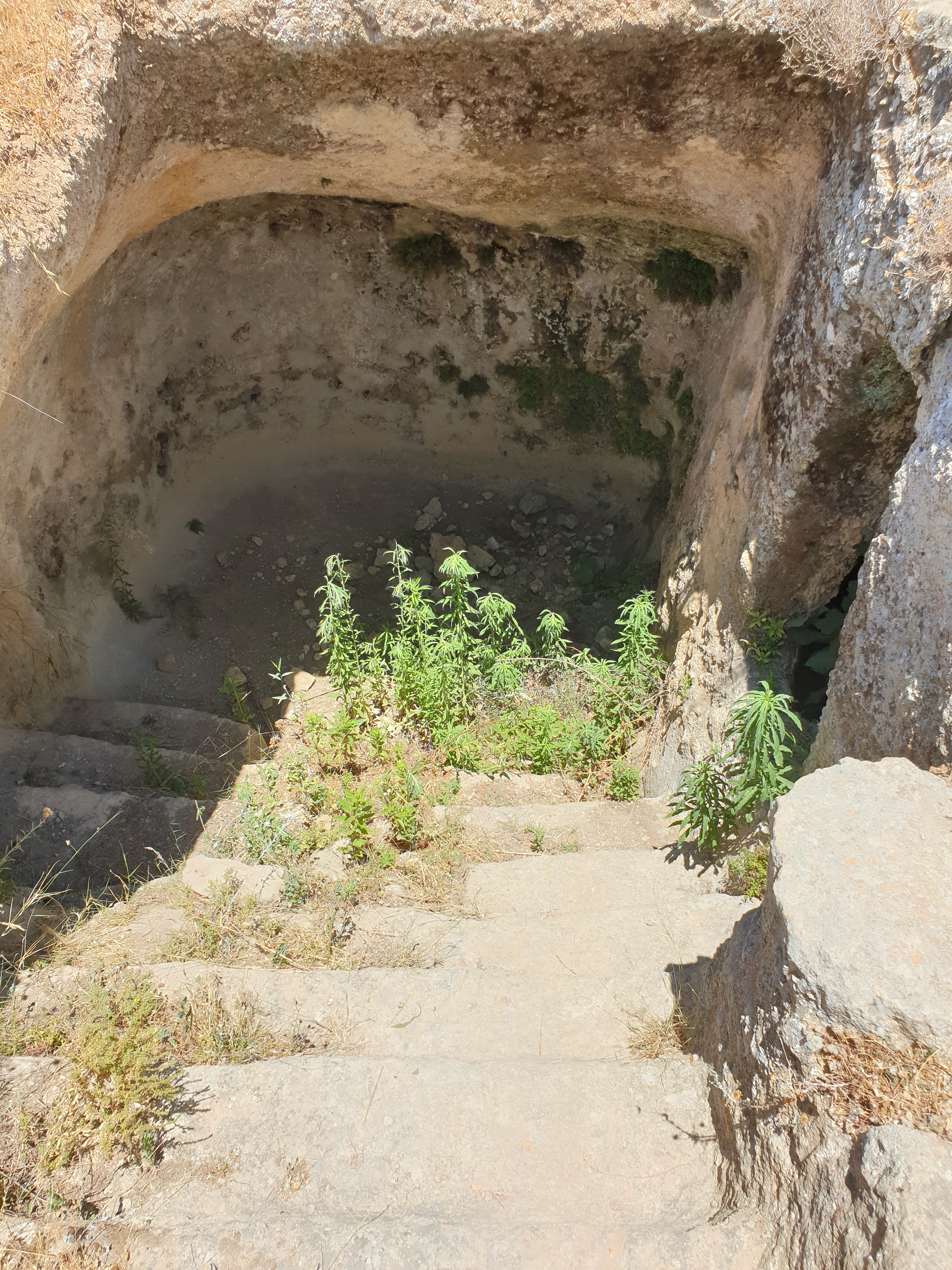
One of the two Hasmonean mikveh found in the excavation

== Israeli–Palestinian conflict ==
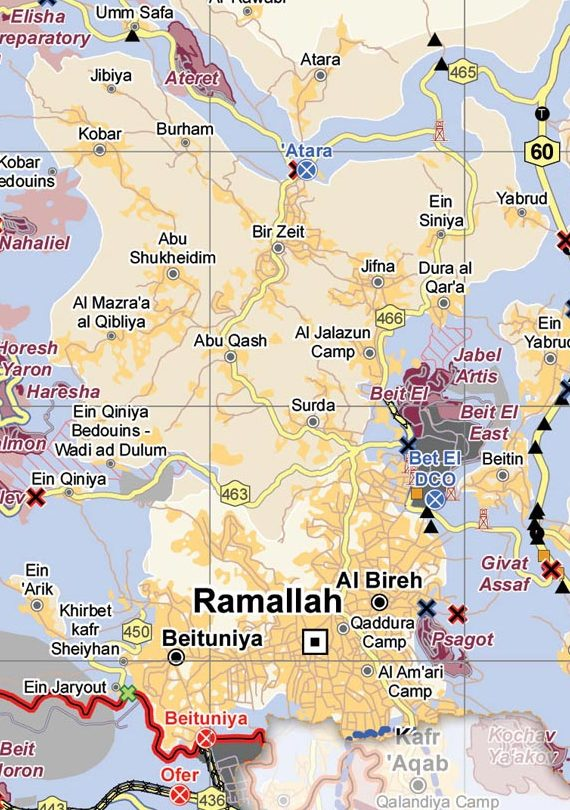
Psagot adjacent to the Ramallah "Island" in a 2018 map

According to B'Tselem, Psagot prevents the expansion of Ramallah and cuts it off from the surrounding villages. During the course of the Second Intifada, snipers shot at Psagot from buildings in Ramallah, leading to the construction of a concrete wall to protect the inhabitants. In 2001, the Israeli army stationed nearby fired two missiles into Ramallah targeting Marwan Barghouti.

In November 2009, the Psagot settlement and Regavim petitioned the High Court of Justice in an unsuccessful attempt to stop construction of the Al-Bireh International Stadium, citing security concerns.

The Sasson Report identified Psagot as the "parent settlement" of an Israeli outpost known as Mitzpe HaAi (Hebrew: מִצְפֵּה הָעָי) located approximately 400 m to the southeast. According to the report, the settlement, unauthorized by the government, was built on land appropriated illegally from its Palestinian owners. According to Peace Now 75.69% of the combined area of Psagot and Mitzpe HaAi is on appropriated private land.

== Status under international law ==
The international community considers Israeli settlements to violate the Fourth Geneva Convention's prohibition on the transfer of an occupying power's civilian population into occupied territory.

Israel disputes the applicability of the Fourth Geneva Convention and argues that the Palestinian territories were not legally held by a sovereign when Israel took control of them. This view has been rejected by the International Court of Justice and the International Committee of the Red Cross.

== Psagot Winery ==
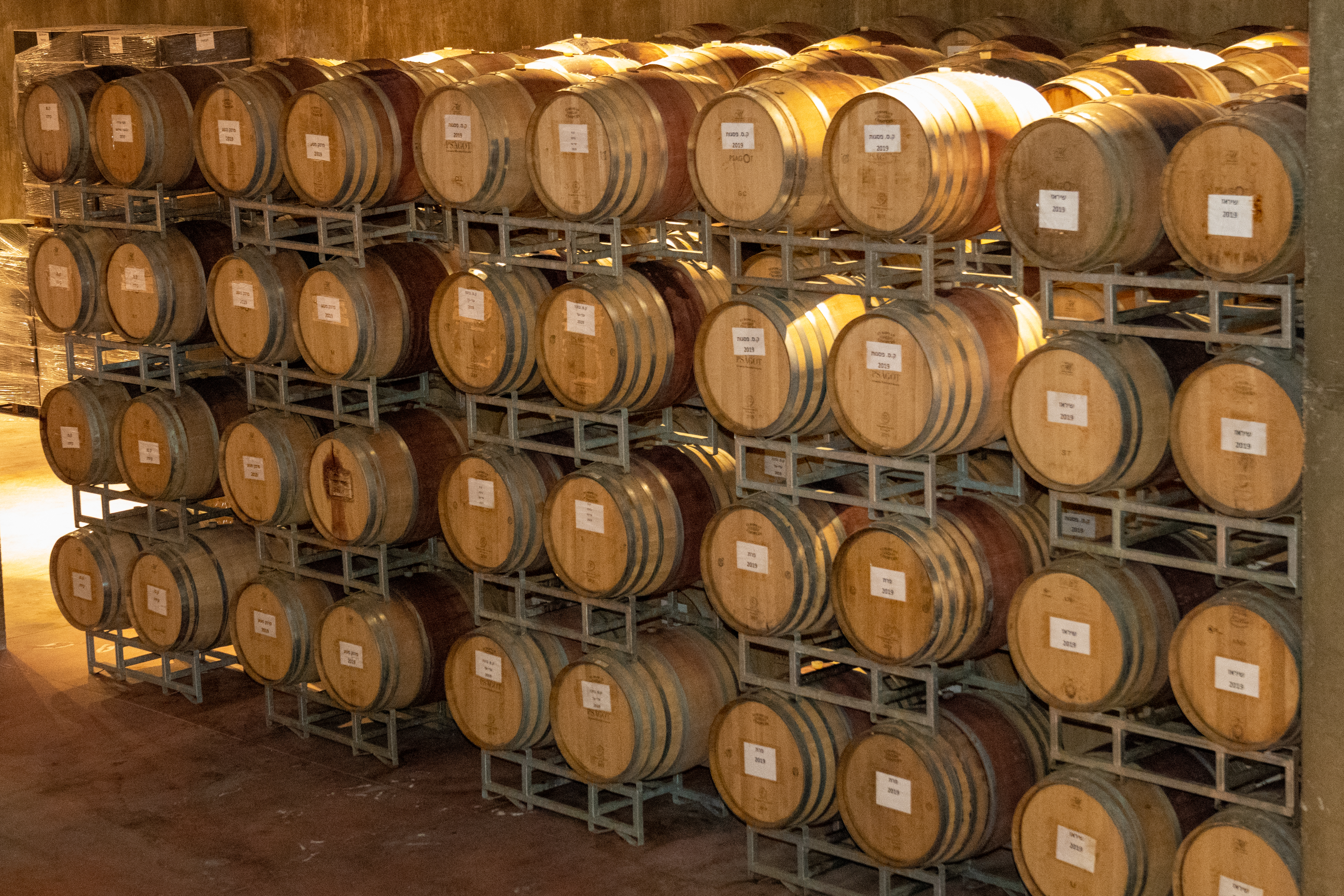
Casks of wine at Psagot Winery

The Psagot Winery was founded by Na’ama and Yaakov Berg, who started to plant vineyards either in 1998, or 2002. Berg, who immigrated to Israel from the Soviet Union, is the CEO. According to the Independent, in 2007 the Falic family of Florida, who own Duty Free America, purchased 32,000 shares in Psagot winery for 4.1 million shekels, becoming majority shareholders and directors. In addition to a modern barrel cellar, some of the oak barriques are stored in a cave dating back to the Second Temple era. The winery's top wine is a Bordeaux blend named Edom. Regular varietal wines are produced in the Psagot series and there is also a Port-style wine. In 2007 and 2008, the winery produced 65,000 bottles annually. In 2010, the winery produced 80,000 bottles of wine a year, the majority for export. By 2015, the number produced had grown to 250,000 bottles per year, of which 65% are exported. Palestinian Arabs and Israeli Jews work there side by side which, according to Akiva Novick, creates an island of co-existence in sea of mistrust. The American evangelical Christian organization HaYovel has sent volunteers to tend and harvest Psagot Winery's vineyards. Non-Jews are not allowed to work in the vineyard itself, for kosher reasons. Berg says calls to boycott his wines have only increased demand. The winery has developed into "a favourite destination" for right-wing Israeli and American politicians. Other wineries exist around Psagot, and the Yesha Council hopes to make them a tourist attraction. According to the local Palestinians and the Israeli human rights group Yesh Din, the wineries are partially planted on privately owned Palestinian land. Israeli officials confirmed that the Berg house lies atop a quarter hectare of privately owned Palestinian land; in 2003 a demolition order (COGAT Order 252/03) was issued by the Israeli authorities against Mr Berg’s home as, even under Israeli law, his decision to build on the privately owned land is illegal. As of 2019, the order had yet to be enforced.

Writing in November 2019, Gideon Levy and Alex Levac noted:

"The land is owned by Palestinians, with documents to prove it – but is now the site of a Jewish winery."[..] "This is the estate of Yaakov Berg, CEO of the Psagot winery, in the central West Bank. Berg’s house stands on section 233 of bloc No. 17. This property belongs to two sisters, Amal and Keinat Quran and their cousin, Karima – but they don’t have any access to it. The grapes are planted on sections 219-220, which is owned by Huria Quran, another relative. That petite, elderly woman is also unable to get to her property."

In November 2020, US Secretary of State Mike Pompeo became the first top US official to visit an Israeli settlement including the Psagot Winery.

=== EU legal proceedings ===
The company initiated legal proceedings in Europe to try to reverse regulations requiring settlement produce to be labelled. On 12 November 2019 the Court of Justice of the European Union in a ruling covering all territory Israel captured in the 1967 war decided that labels on foodstuffs must not imply that goods produced in occupied territory came from Israel itself and must "prevent consumers from being misled as to the fact that the State of Israel is present in the territories concerned as an occupying power and not as a sovereign entity". In its ruling, the court said that failing to inform EU consumers they were potentially buying goods produced in settlements denies them access to "ethical considerations and considerations relating to the observance of international law".

=== Canadian legal proceedings ===
The Winnipeg Jewish university instructor David Kattenburg won a similar judgement in a Canadian court against the fraudulent branding of settlement wines for export, naming the Psagot products on sale in his country. In May 2021, the Federal Court of Appeal dismissed a government appeal and ordered CFIA to explain its decision. Kattenburg submitted information to CFIA in September 2021 showing that the Psagot Winery was situated entirely on Palestinian property. In May 13, 2022, the CFIA reaffirmed its original decision.
