= Yisrael Gantz =

Israeli politician (born 1978)

- ישראל גנץ
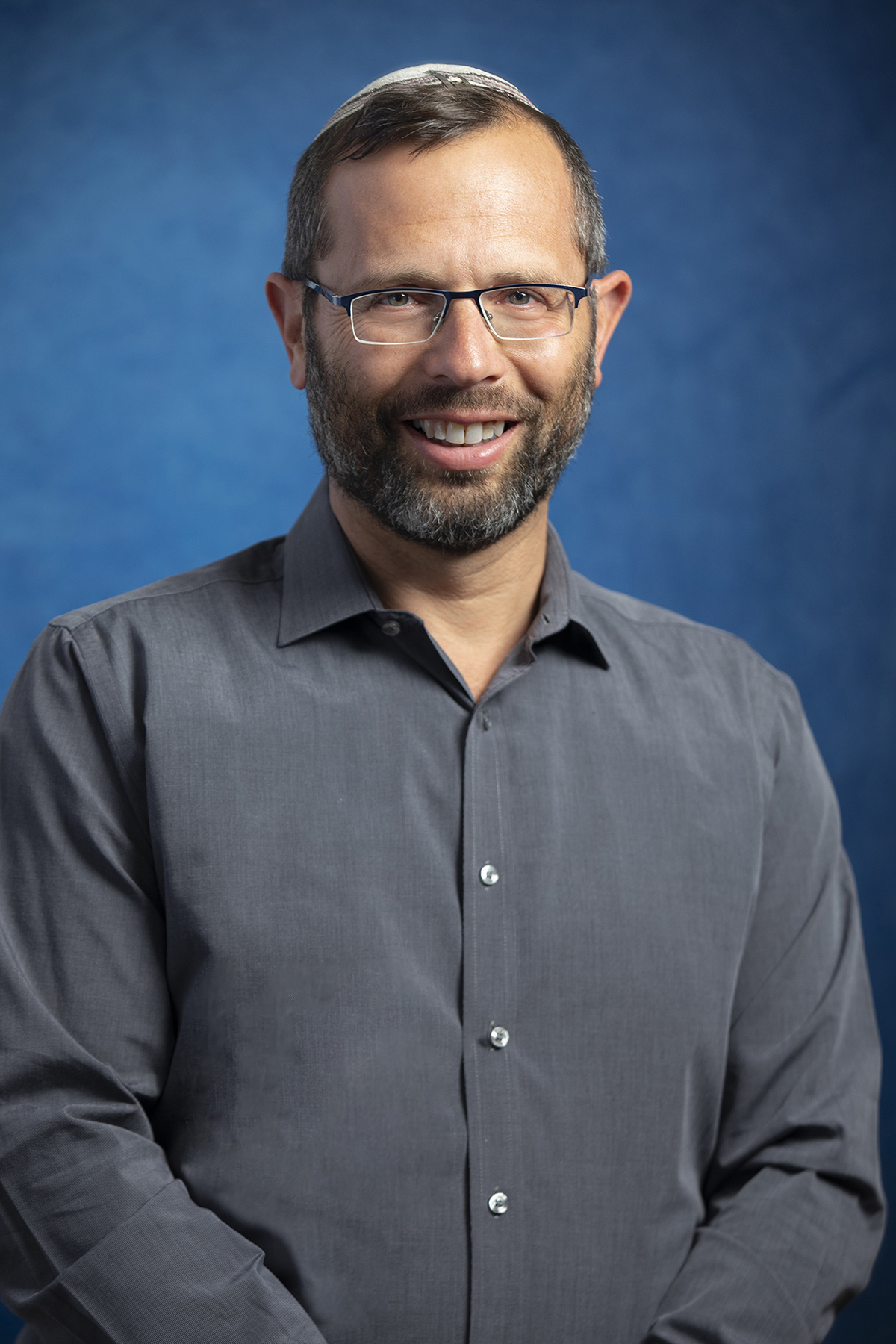
- Born: 5 March 1978 (age 48)
- Known for: Head of the Mateh Binyamin Regional Council
- Website: https://www.israel-gantz.co.il/

Menachem Israel Ganz (born 5 March 1978) is the governor of the Mateh Binyamin Regional Council and the chairman of the Yesha Council.

== Biography ==
Yisrael Gantz was born in Jerusalem. Yisrael's father is Haim Gantz, the head of the Ma'ale Eliyahu High Yeshiva in Tel Aviv. His mother, Yemima Gantz, is a psychologist. Israel grew up mainly in Kiryat Arba. Gantz served in the Givati Brigade.

In 2007, Gantz began serving as a member of Mateh Binyamin Regional Council. In 2018, Gantz ran for council head and won the election. In 2024, he was re-elected as a sole candidate. In 2018, Gantz ran for council head and won the election. On May 6, 2024, he was appointed as the head of the Yesha Council.
