= Mitzpe Dani =

Coordinates: 31.8808°N 35.3145°E

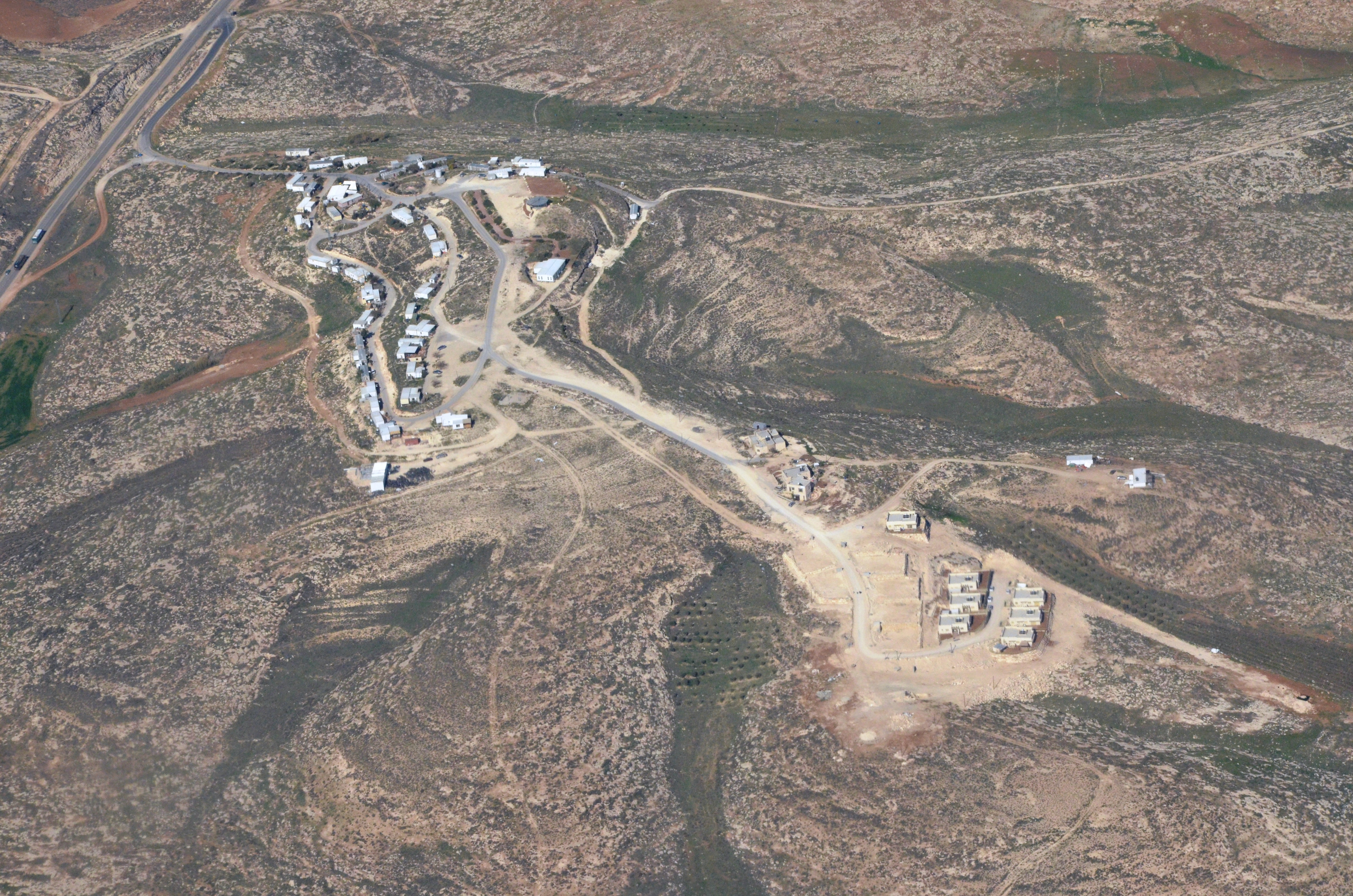
- Mitzpe Dani, 2014
- Interactive map of Mitzpe Dani
- Country: Palestine
- District: Judea and Samaria Area
- Council: Mateh Binyamin
- Region: West Bank
- Founded: 1998
- Founder: Ma'ale Mikhmas residents

Mitzpe Dani (Hebrew: מצפה דני, lit. Danny Lookout) is an Israeli outpost in the West Bank. Located near Ma'ale Mikhmas, it falls under the jurisdiction of the Mateh Binyamin Regional Council. It is home to around 25 families.

The international community considers Israeli settlements in the West Bank illegal under international law, whereas Israeli outposts, like Mitzpe Dani, are considered illegal both under international law as well as under Israeli law.

== History ==
The outpost was established in 1998 by residents of Ma'ale Mikhmas, and was named after Danny Frei, a settler from Ma'ale Mikhmas who was killed in a Palestinian attack on his home in 1995.
