= Mateh Binyamin Regional Council =

Israeli regional council in the West Bank

Coordinates: 31°54′N 35°13′E

Mateh Binyamin מטה בנימין
- Regional council (from 1980)
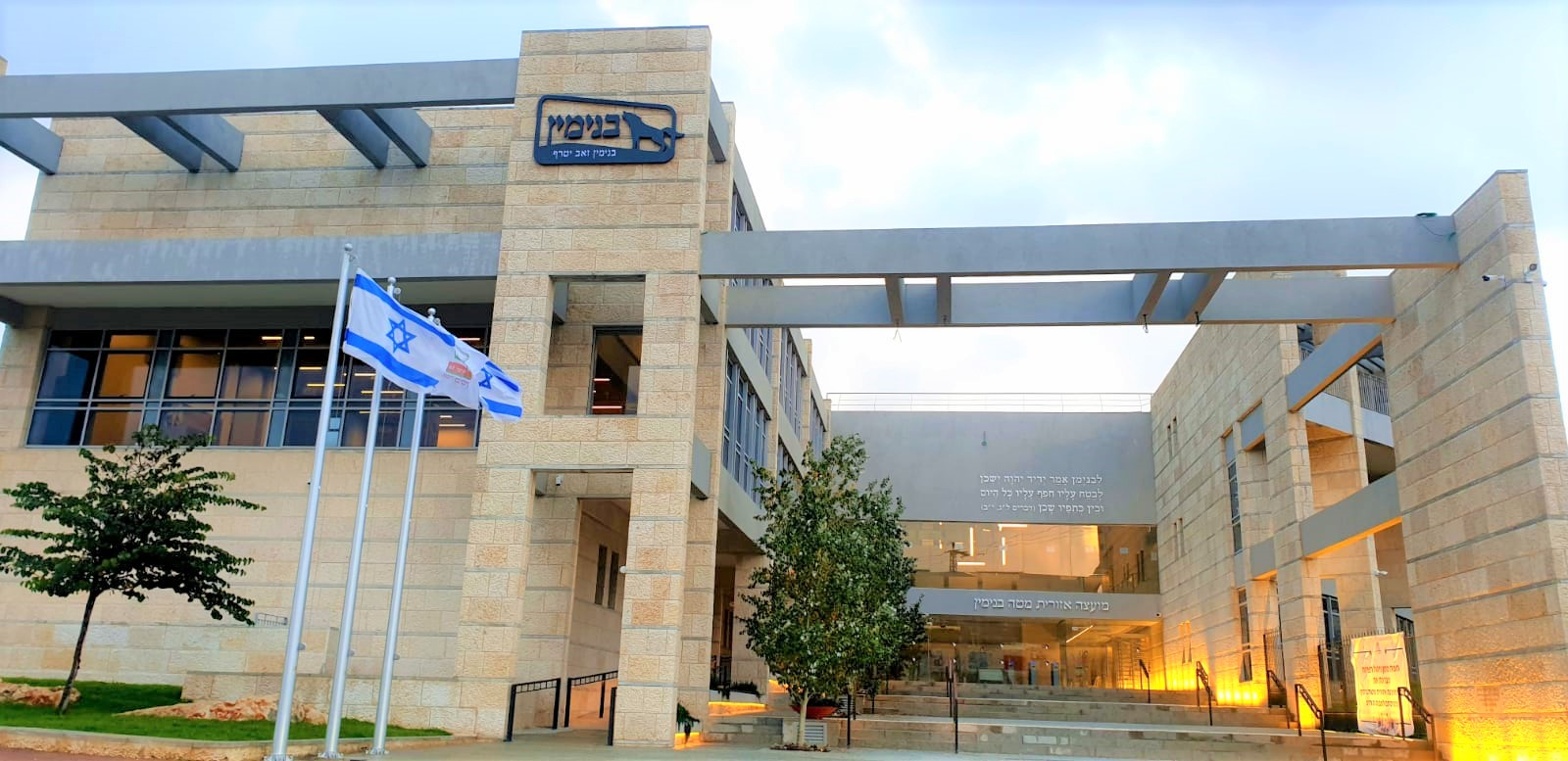
- The new council building (from December 2020) at Sha'ar Binyamin

- Interactive map of Mateh Binyamin
- Region: West Bank
- District: Judea and Samaria Area

Government
  - Head of Municipality: Yisrael Gantz

Population (2024)
  - Total: 80,917
- Website: Official website

Mateh Binyamin Regional Council (Hebrew: מועצה אזורית מטה בנימין, romanized: Mo'atza Azorit Mateh Binyamin, lit. 'Council for the Region of the Tribe of Benjamin') is a regional council governing 47 Israeli settlements and outposts in the West Bank. The council's jurisdiction is from the Jordan valley in the east to the Samarian foothills in the west, and from the Shiloh creek in the north to the Jerusalem Mountains in the south.

The seat of the council is Psagot. The council is named for the ancient Israelite tribe of Benjamin, whose territory roughly corresponds to that of the council. The region in which the Binyamin settlements are located is referred to as the Binyamin Region.

Much of the international community, with the notable exception of the United States, considers Israeli settlements to be illegal, but the state of Israel disputes this, and this applies to all communities under the administration of Mateh Binyamin.

== List of settlements ==
This regional council provides various municipal services for the 47 settlements within its territory:

Name	Type	Founded	Population (2022)
Adei Ad	Community settlement	1990	
Ahia	Community settlement	1997	
Almon (Anatot)	Community settlement	1982	1,467
Alon	Community settlement	1990	1,111
Amichai	Community settlement	2017	264
Ateret	Community settlement	1981	891
Beit Horon	Community settlement	1977	1,442
Dolev	Community settlement	1983	1,613
Eli	Community settlement	1984	4,701
Esh Kodesh	Community settlement	2001	
Ganei Modi'in	Community settlement	1985	2,735
Geva Binyamin (Adam)	Community settlement	1984	5,913
Giv'at Asaf	Community settlement	2001	
Givat Harel	Neighbourhood	1998	
Givat HaRoeh	Neighbourhood	2003	
Giv'on HaHadasha	Community settlement	1981	996
Halamish (Neve Tzuf)	Community settlement	1977	1,590
Harasha	Community settlement	1997	
Hashmonaim	Community settlement	1987	2,589
Keeda	Community settlement	2003	
Kerem Reim	Community settlement	2009	
Kfar Adumim	Community settlement	1979	4,957
Kfar HaOranim (Menora/Giv'at Ehud)	Community settlement	1997	2,604
Kokhav HaShahar	Community settlement	1980	2,501
Kokhav Ya'akov	Community settlement	1984	9,794
Ma'ale Levona	Community settlement	1984	1,018
Ma'ale Mikhmas	Community settlement	1981	1,744
Matityahu	Community settlement	1981	920
Mevo Horon	Moshav	1969	2,669
Migron	Community settlement	1999	260
Mitzpe Danny	Israeli outpost	1998	
Mitzpe Hagit	Israeli outpost	1999	
Mitzpe Kramim	Israeli outpost	1999	
Mitzpe Yeriho	Community settlement	1976	2,657
Na'ale	Community settlement	1988	2,839
Nahliel	Community settlement	1984	743
Neria (Talmon Bet/North)	Community settlement	1991	
Neveh Erez	Israeli outpost	2001	
Nili	Community settlement	1981	2,059
Nofei Prat	Community settlement	1992	
Ofra	Community settlement	1975	3,497
Psagot	Community settlement	1981	2,086
Rimonim	Community settlement	1980	707
Shiloh	Community settlement	1978	5,072
Shvut Rachel	Community settlement	1992	
Talmon	Community settlement	1989	5,379
Tel Zion	Community settlement	2000	

The community settlement of Ofarim was joined with the adjacent local council of Beit Aryeh in 2003 and has ceased to exist as an independent entity. Tel Zion was a semiautonomous neighbourhood of Kokhav Ya'akov, ultimately becoming a separate locality in 2023, while Zeit Ra'anan is a semiautonomous neighbourhood of Talmon. Amona was dismantled by government order in 2016 and a new site was authorized in the Shiloh Bloc. Ginot Aryeh was established in 2001 but evacuated in 2004.

Several settlements that were previously outposts were legalized in the period from 2023 to 2026.

== Demographics ==
Historical population
Year	Pop.	±%
1983	3,100	—
1995	20,400	+558.1%
2008	44,000	+115.7%
2022	76,010	+72.8%
2024	80,917	+6.5%

== Heads of the council ==
Name	Took office	Left office
Pinchas Wallerstein	1979	2008
Avi Roeh	2008	2018
Yisrael Gantz	2018	Incumbent

== Voting patterns ==
In the 2022 election, 88 percent of voters in the regional council voted for the parties of the right-wing coalition led by Benjamin Netanyahu, while 12 percent voted for the parties of the center-left coalition led by Yair Lapid and 0.05 percent voted for the Arab parties.

In the 2026 election, 80 percent of voters in the regional council voted for the parties of the right-wing coalition led by Benjamin Netanyahu, while 12 percent voted for the parties of the center-left coalition led by Gadi Eisenkot and 0.04 percent voted for the Arab parties. An additional 2.2 percent voted for the Reservists, and 3.9 percent voted for Amcha Yisrael. Voter turnout increased 17 percent from the 2022 election.
