= Sha'ar Binyamin Industrial Zone =

Israeli settlement in West Bank

Sha'ar Binyamin: אזור תעשייה שער בנימין (Hebrew)
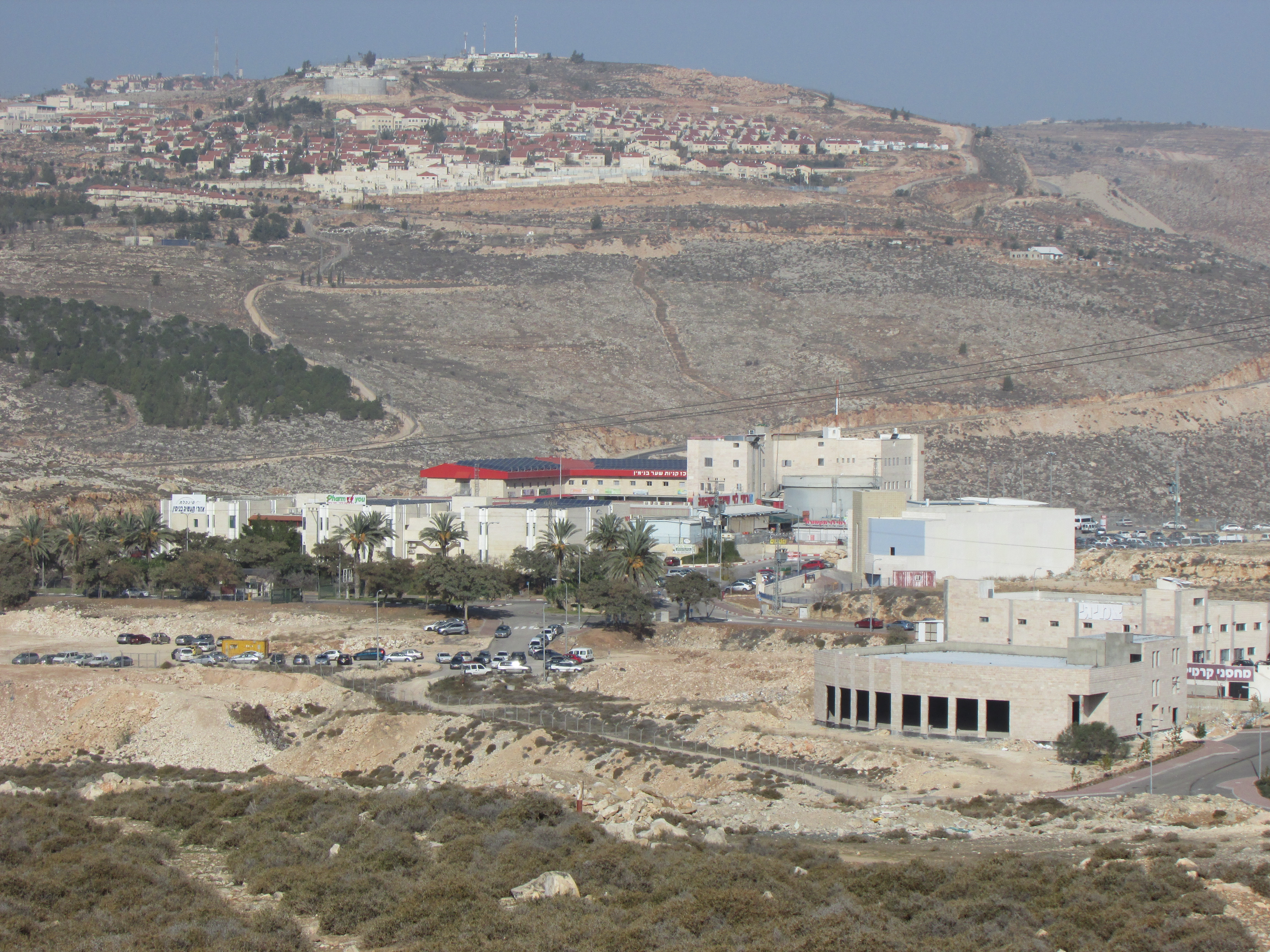
- Etymology: Gate of Benjamin
- Location within Jerusalem District
- Coordinates: 31°52′03.00″N 35°15′45.00″E
- Country: Israel
- District: Judea and Samaria Area
- Council: Mateh Binyamin
- Region: West Bank
- Founded: 1998
- Founder: Mateh Binyamin "Industrial Zones Authority"
- Area: 606 dunams (60.6 ha; 150 acres)

Sha'ar Binyamin (Hebrew: שער בנימין) is an Israeli light industrial park in the occupied West Bank, built in 1998 over land expropriated from the Palestinian villages of Jaba' and Mukhmas. It is located in the Mateh Binyamin Regional Council, Israeli-occupied West Bank, located 2km north of Geva Binyamin on Route 60 and about 5 minutes drive from Pisgat Ze'ev in Jerusalem. The park covers an area of 606 dunams (150 acres).

The international community considers Israeli settlements in the West Bank illegal under international law, but the Israeli government disputes this.

== History ==
According to ARIJ, Israel confiscated land from two nearby Palestinian villages in order to construct Sha'ar Binyamin:

- 545 dunams from Jaba', and
- 28 dunams from Mukhmas.

It was established by the Regional Council's "Industrial Zones Authority," which promotes development in its area. The Israeli Industry, Trade and Labor Ministry also invested about 20 million Israeli new shekel in developing the region. The park was granted "National Priority Area A" status in 2002 for a 13-year period enabling tax benefits to create jobs for residents of the Jewish and Arab communities in the region. Public transportation is provided by buses along Route 60.

Like other industrial parks in the West Bank, many Israelis and Palestinians coexist and work side by side in factories and stores at Sha'ar Binyamin.

One of the big draws is a Rami Levy supermarket. There are also bakeries (including a bakery which is experimenting in baking showbread as was used in the Temple in Jerusalem), furniture stores, clothing stores, hardware and housewares stores, auto leasing, auto repair shops, a computer store, a winery, an optician, and a dental clinic. Offices of The Jewish Agency's Settlement Division, an events hall and a section designated for high-tech businesses can also be found in the park.

The industrial park is located above the drainage basin of the Wadi Qelt Nature Reserve and is therefore subject to rigorous standards on soil and water pollution. A water purification facility processes the park's waste water and the establishment of polluting heavy industry is prohibited.
