= Kerem Reim =

Israeli settlement in the West Bank

Kerem Reim כרם רעים
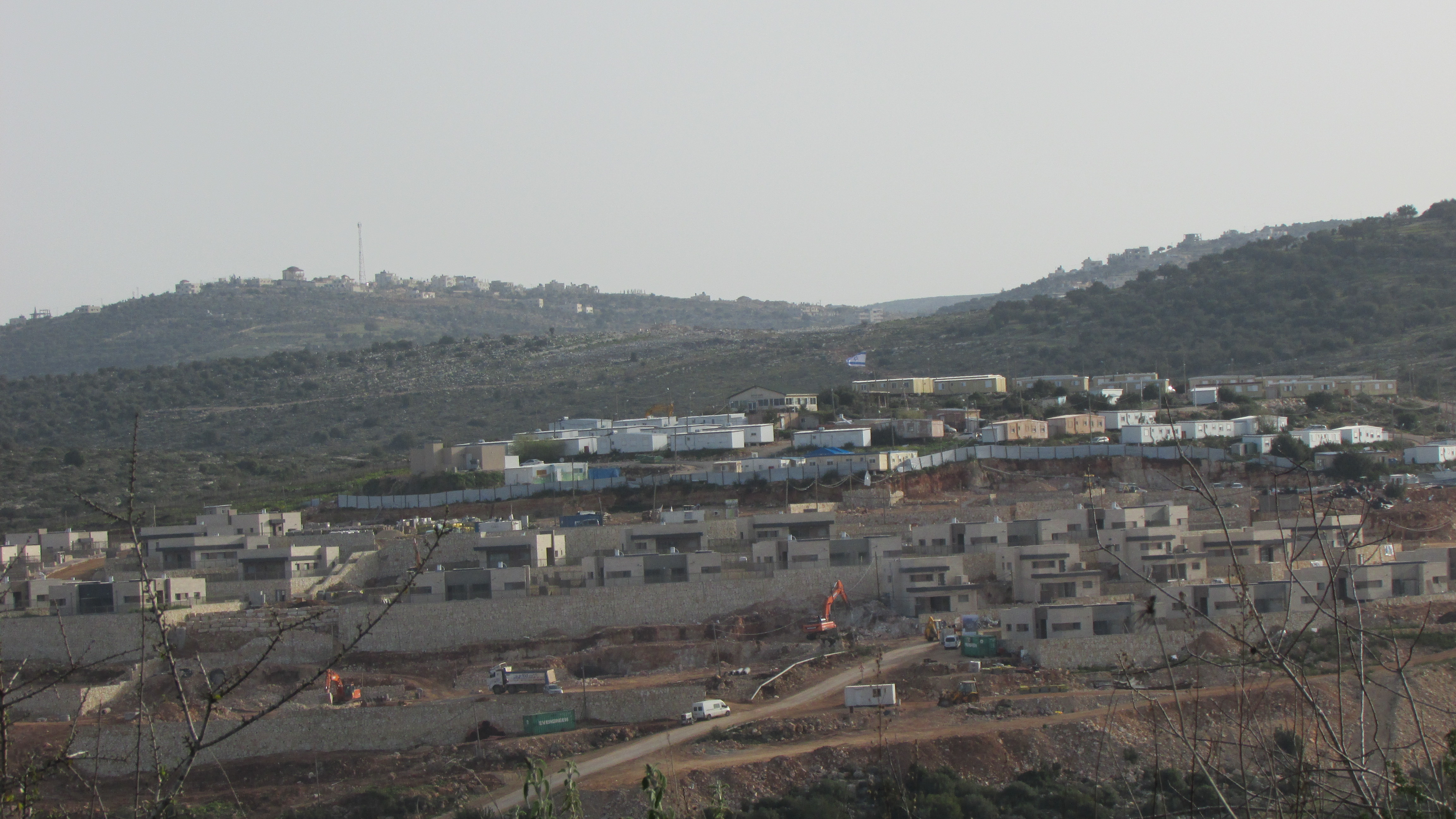

- Location within Israel Location within the West Bank
- Coordinates: 31°56′14.27″N 35°8′18.43″E
- Country: Palestine
- Region: Samaria, West Bank
- Regional Council: Mateh Binyamin
- bloc: Gush Talmonim

Kerem Reim (Hebrew: כרם רעים) is an Israeli settlement in the West Bank, located in the Mateh Binyamin area. It was legalized in 2025.

The settlement's name (Reim, Hebrew for "friends") is named after three Israeli soldiers who were killed during military operations.

The international community considers Israeli settlements in the West Bank illegal under international law, but the Israeli government disputes this.

== History ==
Kerem Reim was established in 2009 as an unauthorized Israeli outpost under the name of Nahali Tal. Nahali Tal acquired a mikveh in 2014. In late 2016 vandals broke into the outpost and damaged the local irrigation system. The vandals also attacked a vineyard owned by the Jewish Agency, displacing 500 seedlings. Authorities accused Palestinians and left-wing activists of responsibility.

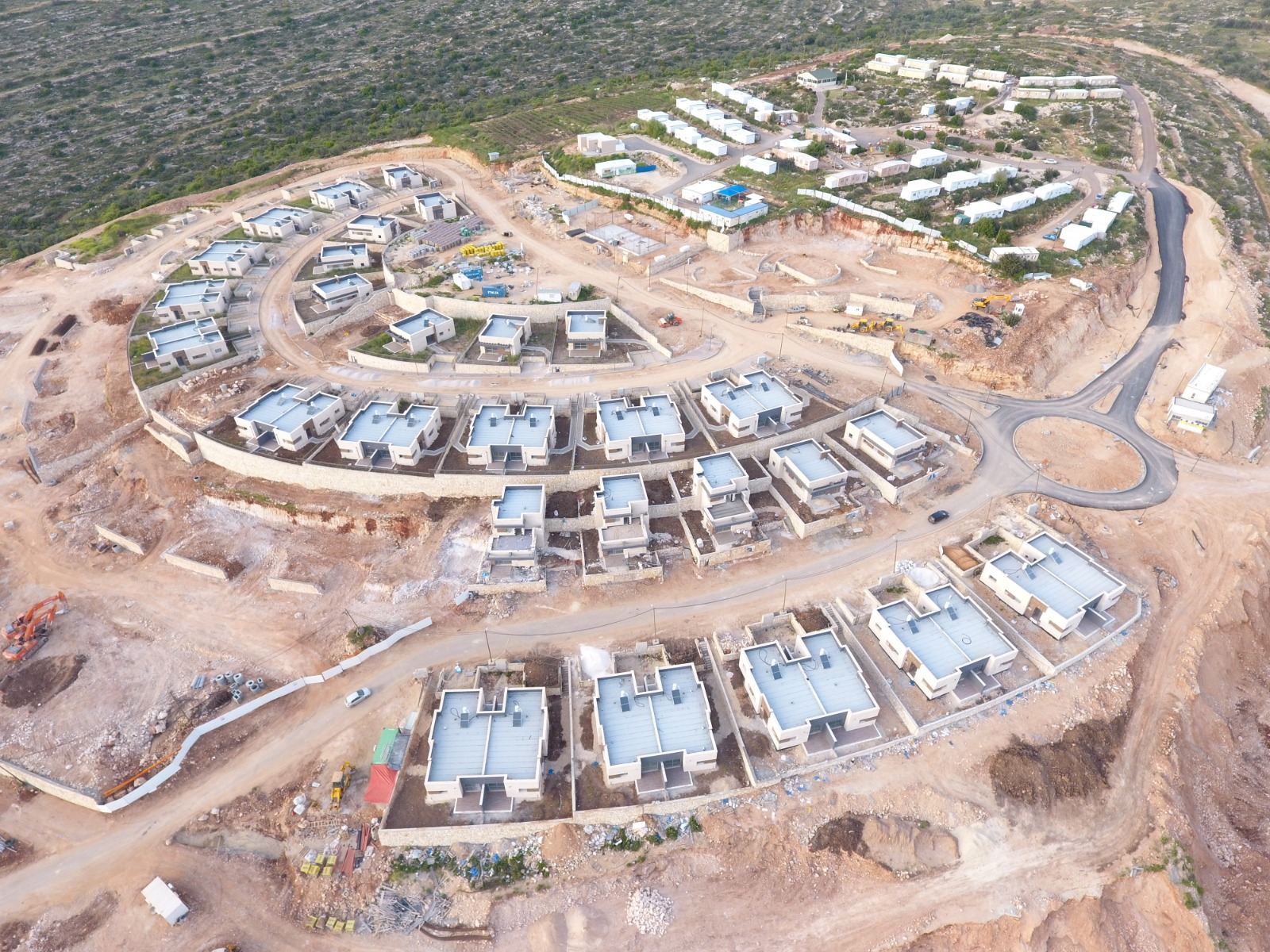
Kerem Reim, 2019

After repeated complaints by the Peace Now movement, the High Court of Justice issued an injunction to prevent the then-ongoing construction of 20 buildings in the community for a temporary amount of time. Kerem Reim was authorized as an official settlement in 2017. In December 2021 the Ministry of Religious Services said it would help allocate money to establish a synagogue in the town.

On March 22, 2025, the Israeli government legalized Kerem Reim.
