= Ginot Aryeh =

Ginot Aryeh: גינות אריה (Hebrew)
- Etymology: Aryeh's Gardens
- Country: Israel
- District: Judea and Samaria Area
- Council: Mateh Binyamin
- Region: West Bank
- Founded: 2001

Ginot Aryeh (Hebrew: גינות אריה, lit. 'Aryeh's Gardens') was an Israeli settlement outpost in the West Bank. Located near Ofra, it fell under the jurisdiction of Mateh Binyamin Regional Council.

The settlement was established in 2001, and was named after Aryeh Hershkovits, a settler killed by Palestinians in 2001. It was vacated in 2004 after an eviction order was signed by then-Prime Minister Ariel Sharon.
