= Kokhav Ya'akov =

Israeli settlement in the West Bank

Kokhav Ya'akov: כּוֹכַב יַעֲקֹב (Hebrew)
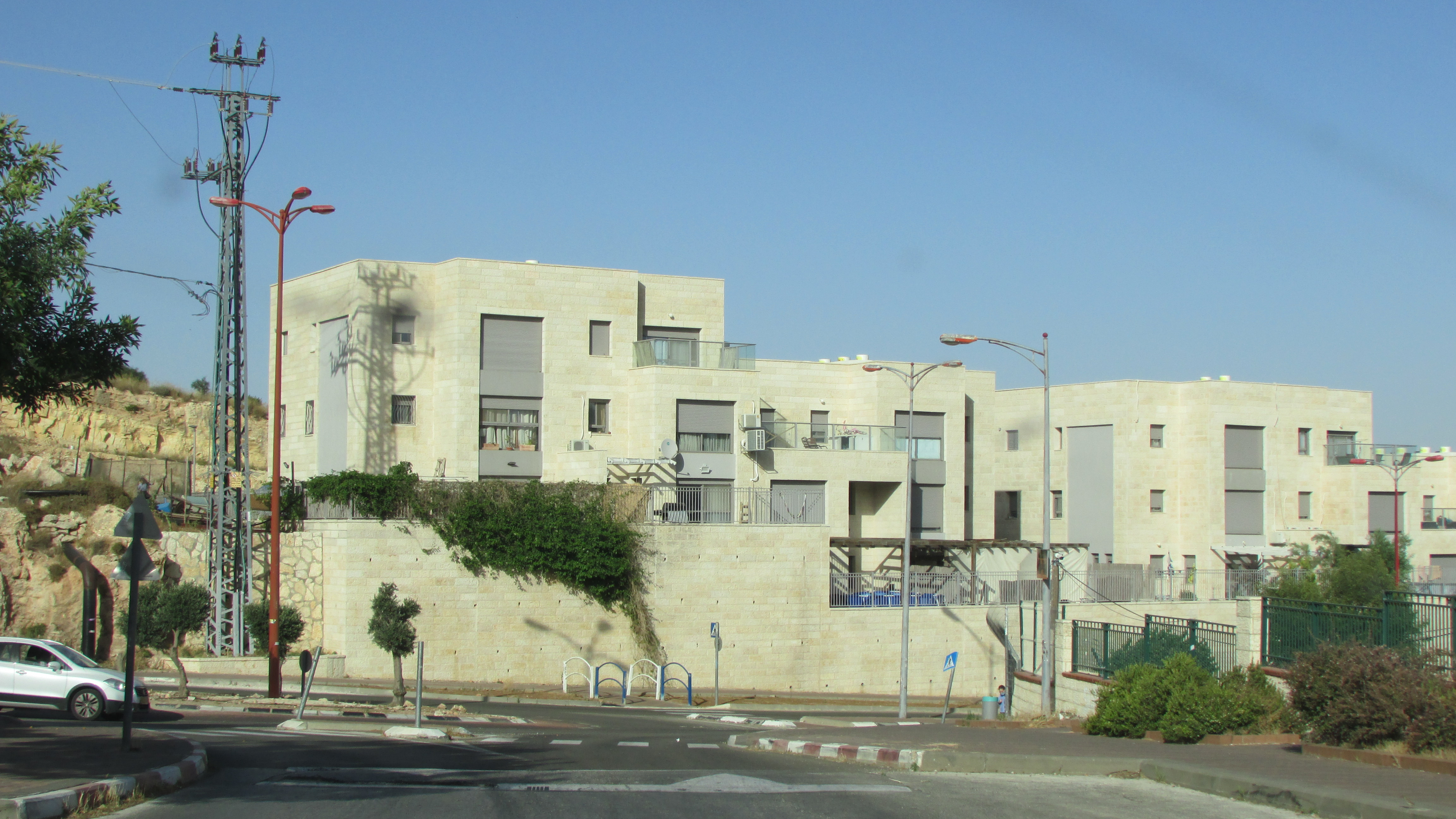
- Houses in Kokhav Ya'akov
- Etymology: Star of Jacob
- Location within the Central West Bank
- Coordinates: 31°52′49″N 35°14′45″E
- Country: Israel
- District: Judea and Samaria Area
- Council: Mateh Binyamin
- Region: West Bank
- Affiliation: Amana
- Founded: 1985
- Population (2024): 4,093
- Website: www.kochav-yaakov.org.il

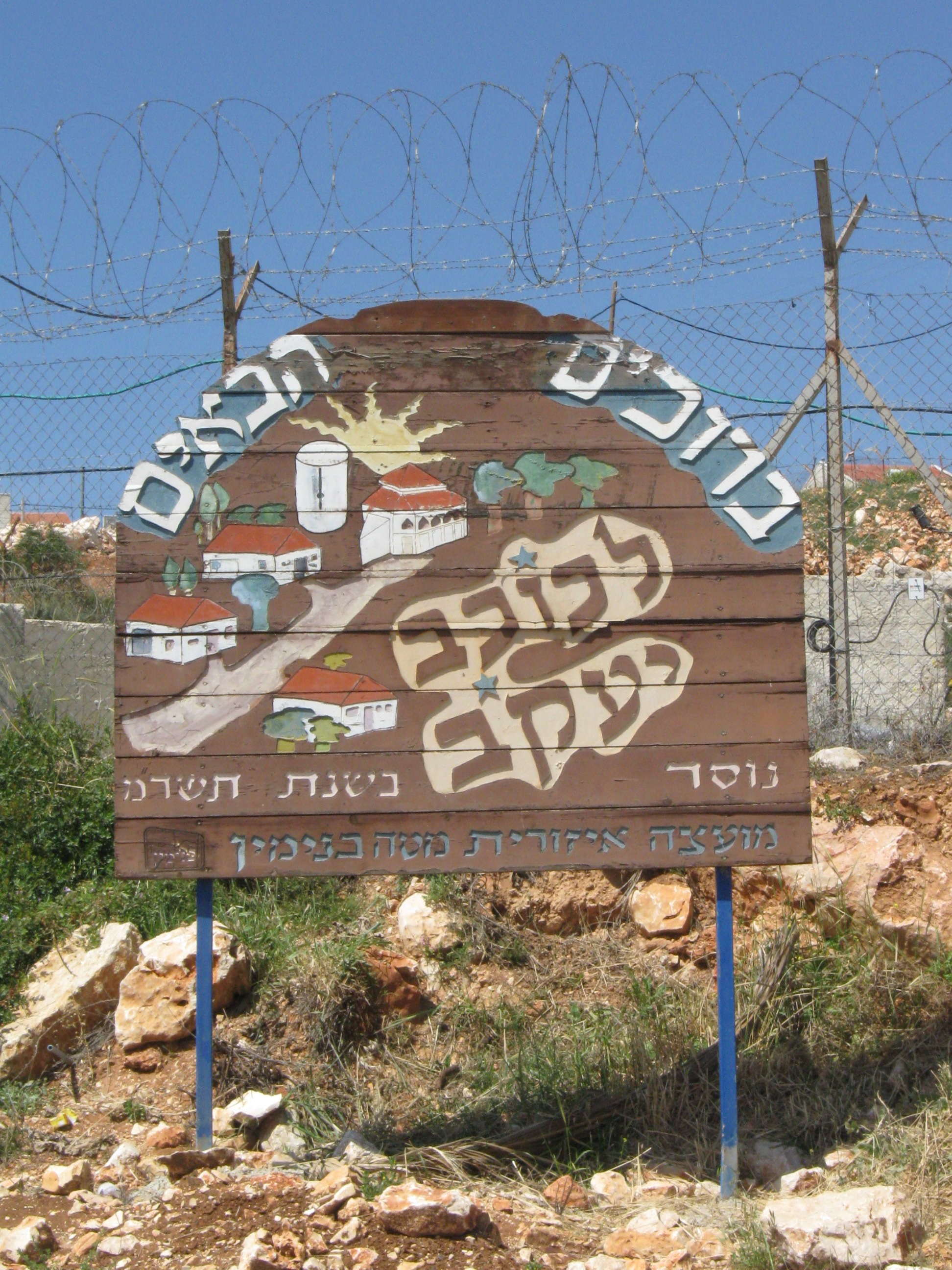
Sign at the entrance to Kokhav Ya'akov

Kokhav Ya'akov (Hebrew: כּוֹכַב יַעֲקֹב, lit. 'Star of Jacob') is a religious Israeli settlement organized as a community settlement in the West Bank. Located near the Palestinian town of al-Bireh, it is administered by Mateh Binyamin Regional Council. In 2024 it had a population of 4,093. The settlement is north of Jerusalem and close to the Palestinian city of Ramallah.

The international community considers Israeli settlements in the West Bank illegal under international law, but the Israeli government disputes this.

== History ==
According to ARIJ Israel confiscated land from two Palestinian villages in order to construct Kokhav Ya'akov:

- 2,037 dunams from Kafr 'Aqab
- 284 dunams from Burqa

The settlement was established in 1985 by the Amana settlement movement, and was initially named Abir Ya'akov after rabbi Yaakov Abuhatzeira. In 1988, its name was changed to Kokhav Ya'akov.

In 2013, Uri Ariel, then serving as Minister of Construction, visited Kochav Ya’akov, where he expressed support for additional home-building. Ariel indicated that he believed there was potential to construction 1,000 more homes in Kochav Ya’akov.

In 2023 the Tel Zion neighbourhood was recognised as an independent settlement.

== Yemen Gallery ==
In March 2013 a heritage and tourism site promoting the legacy of Yemenite Jewry opened in Kokhav Ya'akov. Founded by Shoham Simchi, the Yemen Gallery (Hebrew: החצר התימנית) houses an art gallery and a workshop that recreates the life of Yemen's Jews. The building itself is designed in the spirit of traditional Yemenite architecture.

== Voting Patterns ==
In the 2022 election, 98 percent of voters in Kokhav Ya'akov voted for the parties of the right-wing coalition led by Benjamin Netanyahu, while 1 percent voted for the parties of the center-left coalition led by Yair Lapid and 0.05 percent voted for the Arab parties. 60 percent of voters voted for the Haredi parties Shas or UTJ.

In the 2026 election, 94 percent of voters in Kokhav Ya'akov voted for the parties of the right-wing coalition led by Benjamin Netanyahu, while 2 percent voted for the parties of the center-left coalition led by Gadi Eisenkot. An additional 0.7 percent voted for the Reservists, and 1.6 percent voted for Amcha Yisrael. The Arab parties did not receive any votes. Only 14 percent of voters voted for the Haredi parties Shas or UTJ, due to Tel Zion splitting off and taking most of the Haredi voters with it.

== Notable residents ==
- Bat-El Gatterer (born 1988), Israeli taekwondo Olympian and European champion
