= Tel Zion =

Israeli settlement in the West Bank

Tel Zion: תל ציון (Hebrew)
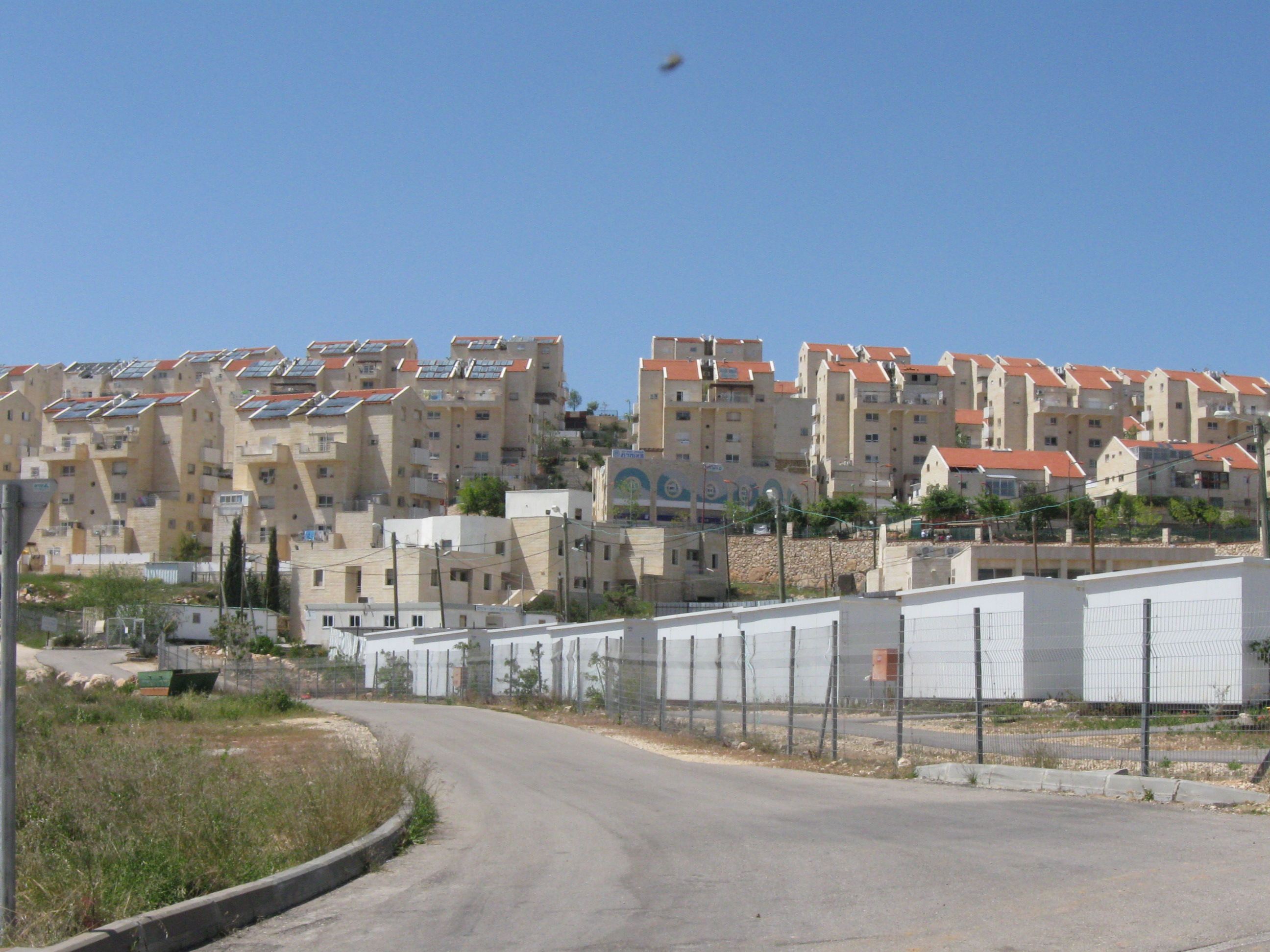

- Location within the Central West Bank Location within the West Bank
- Coordinates: 31°52′48″N 35°14′20″E
- Country: Palestine
- Council: Mateh Binyamin
- Region: West Bank
- Founded: 2000 (independent settlement since 2023)
- Population (2024): 6,935

Tel Zion (Hebrew: תל ציון, lit. 'Hill of Zion') is a Haredi Israeli settlement in the West Bank. Located near Kokhav Ya'akov, it falls under the jurisdiction of Mateh Binyamin Regional Council. In 2024 it had a population of 6,935.

The international community considers Israeli settlements in the West Bank illegal under international law, but the Israeli government disputes this.

== History ==
Tel Zion was originally a suburb of Kokhav Ya'akov, but was recognised as a separate settlement in 2023 as part of a coalition agreement between Likud and Shas.

== Voting Patterns ==
In the 2026 election, 99 percent of voters in Tel Zion voted for the parties of the right-wing coalition led by Benjamin Netanyahu, while 0.4 percent voted for the parties of the center-left coalition led by Gadi Eisenkot. No votes were cast for the Arab parties. 87 percent of voters voted for the Haredi parties Shas or UTJ.
