= Hashmonaim =

Israeli settlement in the West Bank

Hashmonaim: חַשְׁמוֹנָאִים (Hebrew)

Hebrew transcription(s)
  - Unofficial: Ramat Modi'in
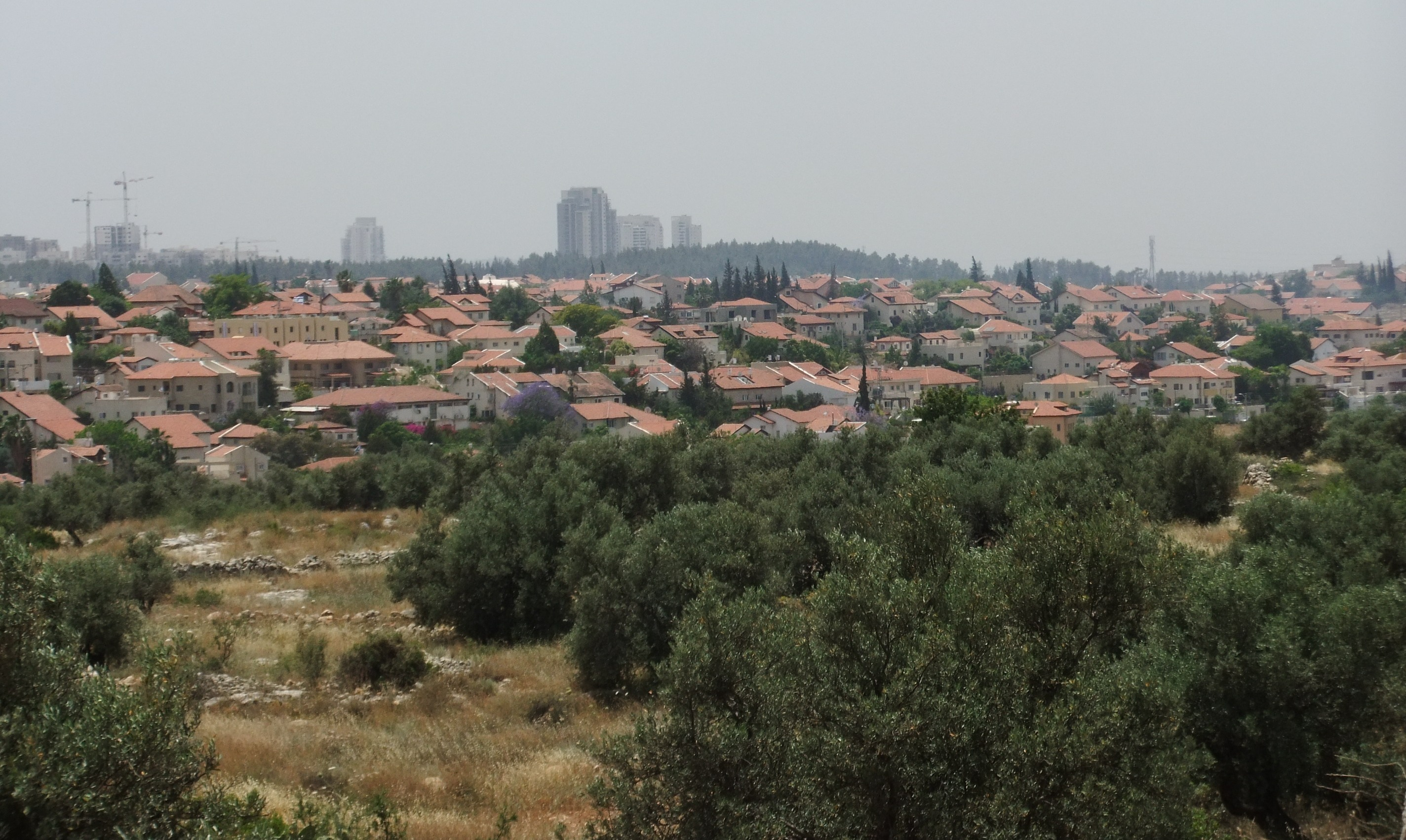

- Location within the Central West Bank
- Coordinates: 31°55′51.65″N 35°1′17.66″E
- Country: Israel
- District: Judea and Samaria Area
- Council: Mateh Binyamin
- Region: West Bank
- Founded: July 7, 1988
- Population (2024): 3,091

Hashmonaim (Hebrew: חַשְׁמוֹנָאִים, lit. Hasmoneans) is an Israeli settlement located in the western section of the West Bank, off Route 443. Hashmonaim is located two kilometers east of Modi'in-Maccabim-Re'ut, midway between Jerusalem and Tel Aviv and is part of the Mateh Binyamin Regional Council. In 2024 it had a population of 3,091.

The international community considers Israeli settlements in the West Bank illegal under international law, but the Israeli government disputes this.

== History ==
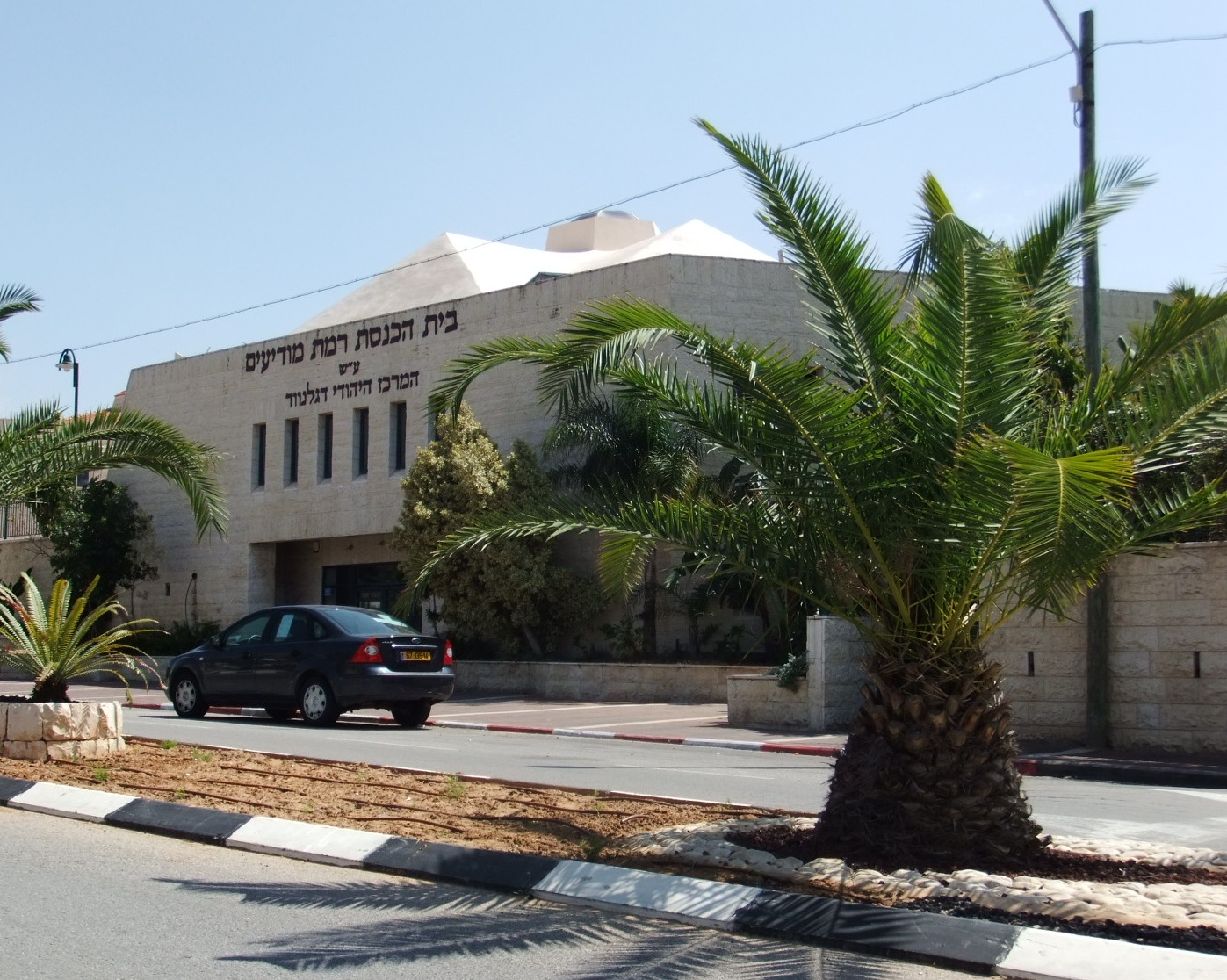
Synagogue in Hashmonaim

According to ARIJ, Israel confiscated land from several Palestinian villages/towns nearby in order to construct Hashmonaim:

- 945 dunams from Ni'lin,
- 186 dunams from Al-Midya,
- 5 dunams from Saffa.

Under Israeli legal rulings, this territory was claimed as unoccupied state land by the prior sovereign entity, the Hashemite Kingdom of Jordan, and thus passed to the subsequent sovereign entity in occupation, the state of Israel.

Construction of the first homes began in December 1983. A dedication ceremony on June 12, 1984, was attended by Prime Minister Yitzhak Shamir and the Sephardi chief rabbi Mordechai Eliyahu. The first families moved in in August 1987. The name derives from the location of Hashmonaim in a region where the Hasmoneans lived in antiquity.

Hashmonaim originally consisted of two neighborhoods: Ramat Modi'in was established in 1983 and Ganei Modi'in in 1985. In 1996, Ganei Modi'in became part of Modi'in Illit.

In May 2010, three homes in Hashmonaim were demolished by Israeli security forces. The buildings were deemed to be violating a 10-month construction freeze in the West Bank.

== Demographics ==
In 2010, there were 545 families living in Hashmonaim. More than half of the residents were native English speakers, mostly from the United States. Many commute or telecommute to jobs in the United States. The community is affiliated with the religious Zionist youth movement B'nei Akiva.

== Status under international law ==
Like all Israeli settlements in the Israeli-occupied territories, the international community considers Hashmonaim to violate the Fourth Geneva Convention's prohibition on the transfer of an occupying power's civilian population into occupied territory and are as such illegal under customary international law. Israel disputes that the Fourth Geneva Convention applies to the Palestinian territories. This view has been rejected by the International Court of Justice and the International Committee of the Red Cross.

== Communal services ==
There are ten synagogues in Hashmonaim: four Ashkenazi, three Sephardi, two Yemenite and one Chabad. Hashmonaim has five kindergartens, a religious elementary school, and a high-school yeshiva, which attracts boys from all over the Binyamin Region. The community also has a clubhouse for young people, a separate Bnei Akiva branch, two basketball courts, a baseball field, playgrounds, a library and a fitness center.

== Transportation ==
The drive from Hashmoniam to Jerusalem, Tel Aviv, Petah Tikva and Ariel, is approximately thirty minutes by car. Bus connection is also available.

== Sports ==
The Hashmonaim Titans are a local baseball team, part of the annual league run by the Israel Association of Baseball.
