= Mitzpe Hagit =

Mitzpe Hagit: מצפה חגית (Hebrew)
- Location within the Central West Bank
- Coordinates: 31°51′5″N 35°20′17″E
- Country: Palestine
- District: Judea and Samaria Area
- Council: Mateh Binyamin
- Region: West Bank
- Founded: 1999
- Founder: Kfar Adumim residents

Mitzpe Hagit (Hebrew: מצפה חגית, lit. 'Hagit Lookout') is an Israeli outpost in the West Bank. Located near the settlement of Kfar Adumim, it falls under the jurisdiction of the Mateh Binyamin Regional Council. It is home to around 25 families.

The outpost was established in 1999 by families from Kfar Adumim, and was named after Hagit Zavitsky, a settler from Kfar Adumim who was killed in Wadi Qelt in 1997.

The international community considers Israeli settlements in the West Bank illegal under international law, but the Israeli government disputes this.

== History ==
Mitzpe Hagit was founded in early 1999. It began with only two wooden caravans on a hill 4 kilometres (2.5 mi) from Kfar Adumim. On October 12, 1999, Israeli Prime Minister Ehud Barak announced that Mitzpe Hagit was one of 15 outposts in the West Bank that he planned to have dismantled, on the recommendation of the Israeli Defense Ministry. Barak gave the residents 14 hours to appeal.

In November 1999, Pinhas Wallerstein, head of the Mateh Binyamin Regional Council, said that residents of Mitzpe Hagit would voluntarily leave the site until the outpost was officially authorized by the Israeli government.

By the end of December 1999 Mitzpe Hagit had been removed. Peace Now issued a report claiming that the Israeli government had approved new caravans there and in other dismantled outposts. The organization stated that this "testified to the continuation of under-the-table doings in everything linked to building in the settlements."

Efraim Sneh, Deputy Defense Minister at the time, said that his office was not planning to approve any building permits and that "[Neveh] Erez and Hagit were removed; they can submit plans to build but it doesn't mean anything. Therefore the movement shouldn't confuse the public."

By October 2000 settlers had returned to Mitzpe Hagit. There were again two caravans and the population was 8 adults and 4 children. Shimon and Chaya Ben Dor, who had been among the original founders, claimed that their return had the approval of Ehud Barak. Israeli officials, though, were unsure if this was true.
