= Ma'ale Mikhmas =

Israeli settlement in the West Bank

Ma'ale Mikhmas: מַעֲלֵה מִכְמָשׂ (Hebrew)
- Israeli settlement
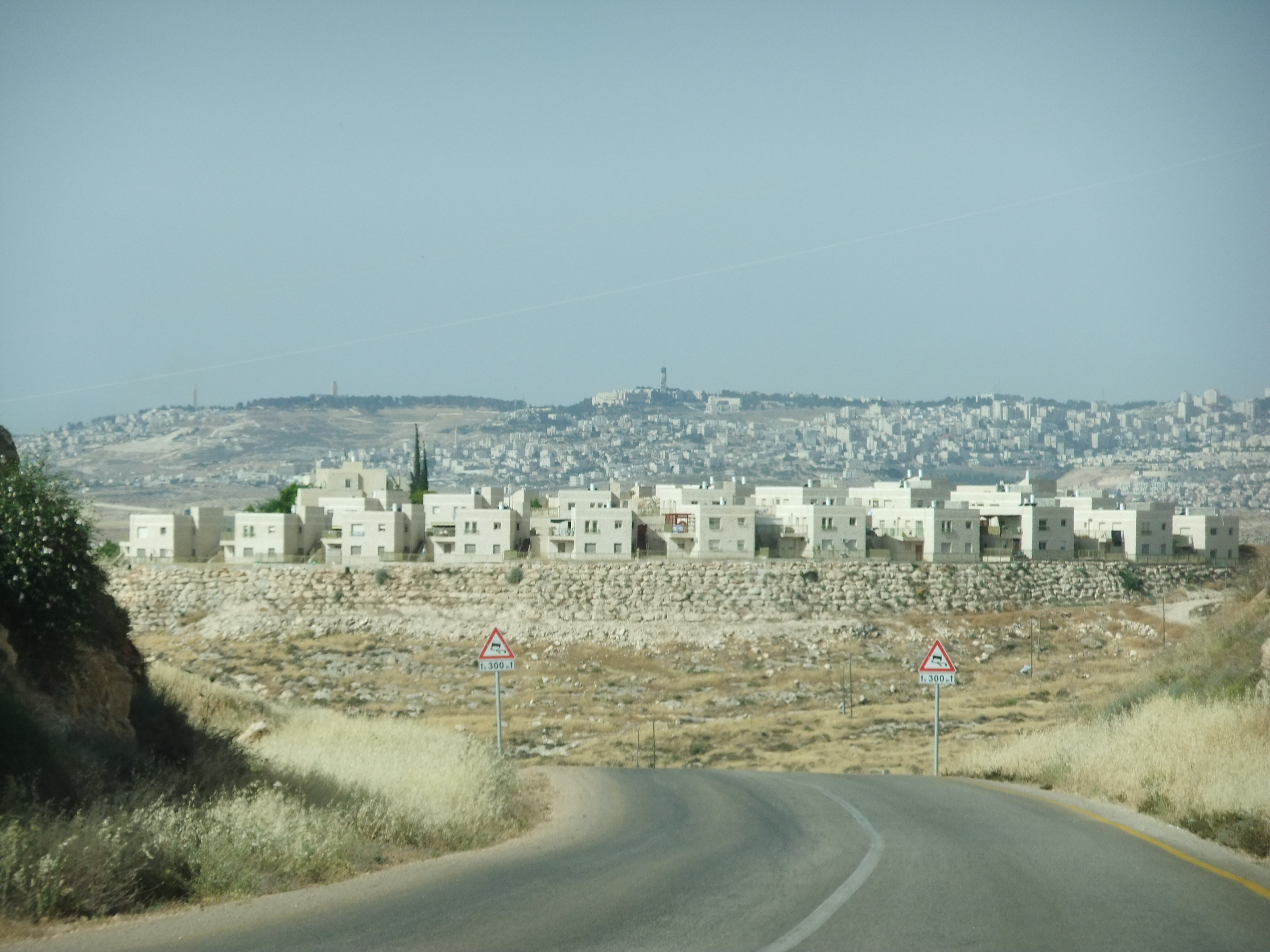

- Location within the Central West Bank
- Coordinates: 31°52′44″N 35°18′23″E
- Country: Palestine
- District: Judea and Samaria Area
- Council: Mateh Binyamin
- Region: West Bank
- Affiliation: Amana
- Founded: 1981
- Population (2024): 2,259

Ma'ale Mikhmas (Hebrew: מַעֲלֵה מִכְמָשׂ) is an Israeli settlement in the Binyamin region of the northern West Bank. Located a few miles northeast of Jerusalem, it falls under the municipal jurisdiction of Mateh Binyamin Regional Council and according to Palestinians the Ramallah and al-Bireh Governorate. In 2024 it had a population of 2,259.

The international community considers Israeli settlements in the West Bank illegal under international law, but the Israeli government disputes this.

== History ==
According to the ARIJ, Israel confiscated 1287 dunums of land from the Palestinian town of Deir Dibwan in order to construct Ma'ale Mikhmas.

Ma'ale Mikhmas was founded in 1981 along the Allon Road by a group of families from Ma'ale Adumim. It is named after the biblical Michmas (Isaiah 10:28; Esra 2:27).

The population of Ma'ale Mikhmas is evenly divided between native-born Israelis and immigrants from English-speaking countries, South America, France and Ethiopia. It defines itself as religious.

== Notable residents ==
- Otniel Schneller (born 1952), politician
