= Abda, Hebron =

Village of Dura in the West Bank

Abda
- Abda, Hebron Arabic: عبدة (الخليل)
- Location of Abda, Hebron within Palestine
- Coordinates: 31°27′59″N 35°00′41″E
- Country: Palestine
- Governorate: Hebron Governorate
- Elevation: 750 m (2,460 ft)

Population (2007)
  - Total: 403

Abda is one of the villages of Dura in the Hebron Governorate, southwest of the city of Hebron and 10 km away from it in the southern West Bank.

== Geography ==
The village of Abda is located in a mountainous area, 750 meters above sea level. It is bordered to the east by the village of Karma, to the north by the village of Khursa, to the south by the villages of Hadab al-Alaqa and Imreish, and to the west by the villages of Khursa and Abu al-Asja.

== History ==
In 1961, under Jordanian rule, 'Abda had 202 inhabitants.

== Population ==
Based on the results of the general population and establishments census conducted in 1997, the population of Abda village in 2007 was estimated at 403 people.

== See also ==
- Dura, Hebron
- Hebron Governorate
