= Hadab al-Alaqa =

Village in Hebron Governorate, Palestine

Hadab al-Alaqa حدب العلقة
- Hadab al-Alaqa, Hebron
- Country: Palestine
- Governorate: Hebron Governorate

Area
  - Total: 1,100 dunams (1.1 km^{2}; 0.42 sq mi)
- estimate
- Elevation: 764 m (2,507 ft)

Population (2007)
  - Total: 641

Hadab al-Alaqa is a village in the area of Dura, in the Hebron Governorate, in the southern West Bank. It is located 12 kilometres (7.5 mi) southwest of the city of Hebron.

== Geography ==
It is bordered to the east by the villages of Abda and al-'Alqa al-Fuqa, to the north by as-Sura, to the west by Deir al-Asal al-Tahta and Iskik, and to the south by Karza.

== History ==
Modern history of the village dates back to 1948, when Palestinians fleeing villages destroyed during the Nakba established Hadab al-Alaqa. The word Hadab, meaning high place in Arabic, came from its location on top of a mountain. As of 2009, 98% of the village's residents were from Al Awawda Family, with the remaining being from the Abu Aharar and al-Darabi’ families.

== Population ==
In 2007, according to the Palestinian Central Bureau of Statistics, the population was 641. As of 2009, the village had one mosque. As of the 2006–2007 school year, it had one seven-classroom school, Al Beyader Elementary Co-education School, with 123 students and 12 teachers.

== See also ==
- Dura, Hebron
- Hebron Governorate
