= Beit ar-Rush al-Tahta =

- Beit ar-Rush al-Tahta, Arabic: دير العسل التحتا
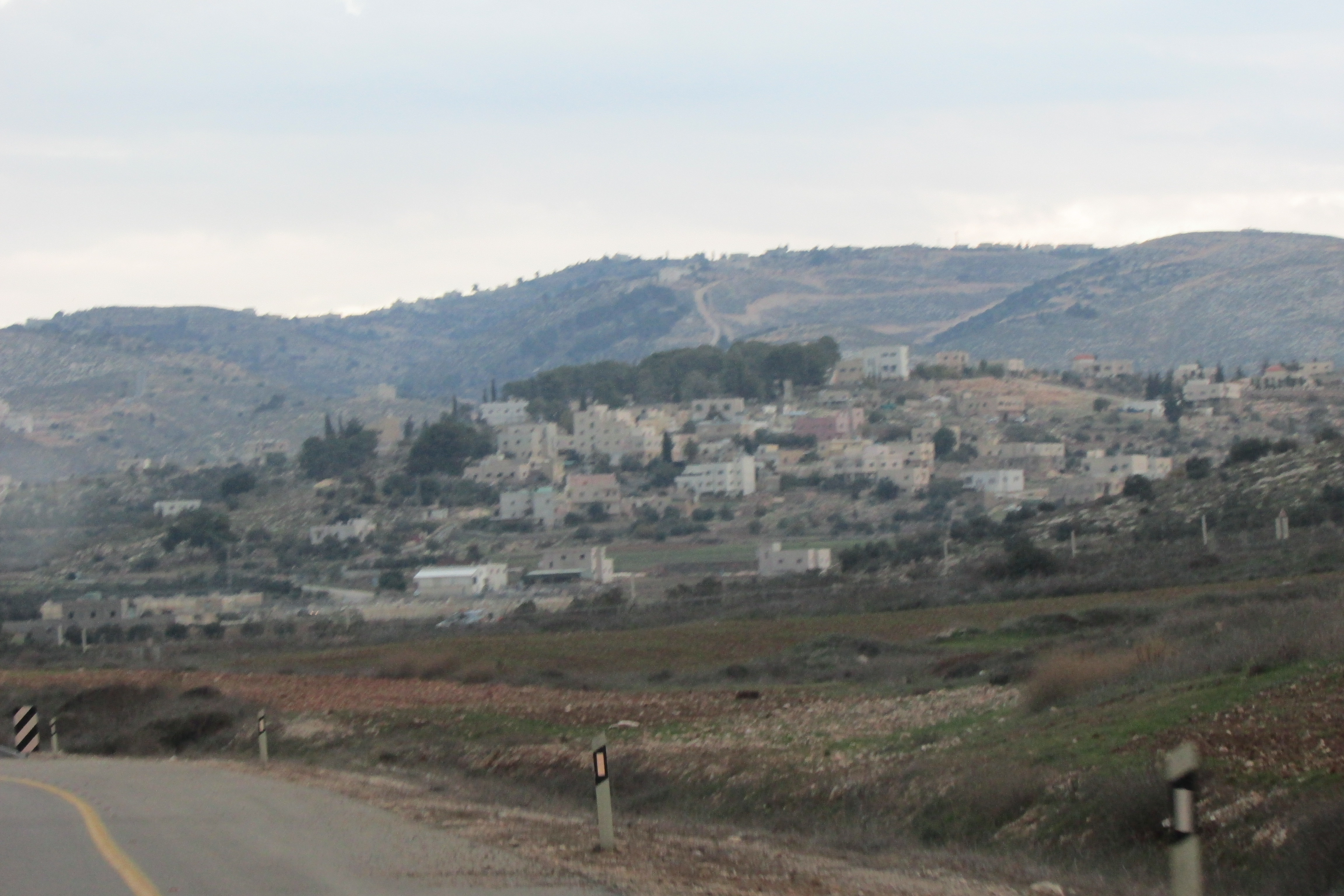
- Beit ar-Rush al-Tahta

- Location of Beit ar-Rush al-Tahta Palestine
- Coordinates: 31°27′50″N 34°56′08″E
- Palestine grid: 143/096
- State: Palestine
- Governorate: Hebron

Population (2017)
  - Total: 424

Beit al-Rush al-Tahta (Arabic: بيت الروش التحتا) is a village in the Hebron Governorate of the southern West Bank. Situated approximately 28 kilometers (17 mi) southwest of Hebron city, the village lies within the Palestinian territories.

== Geography ==
Beit al-Rush al-Tahta is situated at an elevation of 485 meters (1,591 feet) above sea level. The village is bordered by the following localities:

- East: The city of Dura and the village of al-Surra.
- North: The villages of Deir al-Asal al-Fuqa and al-Majd
- South: The village of al-Bireh and the town of Adh-Dhahiriya
- West: The 1949 Armistice Line (Green Line), marking the historic ceasefire boundary between Israeli and Palestinian territories

== History ==
Ceramics from the Byzantine era have been found here.

In 1838 "Beit er-Rush" was noted as being "in ruins or deserted."

In 1863 Victor Guérin described the place he called Khirbet Beit-Rouch: "These ruins consist of a large number of heaps of irregular materials. Each of these heaps surrounds a cave hollowed in the rock, into which there is a descent of steps, or by an incline. These subterranean dwellings formed the basement of one-storied houses which stood above them. These have been pulled down and put up again several times, while the cellars are just the same as when they were cut in the rock."

In 1883, the PEF's Survey of Western Palestine described Beit er Rush: "Traces of ruins on a mound".

In 1961, under Jordanian rule, the population of Beit Rush Tahta was 181 people.

== Population ==
According to the 2017 Palestinian Census, Beit al-Rush al-Tahta had a population of 424 residents.

== See also ==
- Dura, Hebron
- Hebron Governorate

== Bibliography ==
- Conder, C.R.; Kitchener, H.H. (1883). The Survey of Western Palestine: Memoirs of the Topography, Orography, Hydrography, and Archaeology. Vol. 3. London: Committee of the Palestine Exploration Fund.
- Dauphin, C. (1998). La Palestine Byzantine, Peuplement et Populations. BAR International Series 726 (in French). Vol. III : Catalogue. Oxford: Archeopress. ISBN 0-860549-05-4.
- Government of Jordan, Department of Statistics (1964). First Census of Population and Housing. Volume I: Final Tables; General Characteristics of the Population (PDF).
- Guérin, Victor (1869). Description Géographique Historique et Archéologique de la Palestine (in French). Vol. 1: Judee, pt. 2. Paris: L'Imprimerie Nationale.
- Robinson, E.; Smith, E. (1841). Biblical Researches in Palestine, Mount Sinai and Arabia Petraea: A Journal of Travels in the year 1838. Vol. 3. Boston: Crocker & Brewster.
