= Beit Mirsim =

Village in Hebron Governorate, Palestine

Beit Mirsim Arabic: بيت مرسم
- Beit Mirsim
- Location of Beit Mirsim within Palestine
- Coordinates: 31°27′08″N 34°55′02″E
- Palestine grid: 131/095
- Country: Palestine
- Governorate: Hebron Governorate
- Elevation: 500 m (1,600 ft)

Population (2007)
  - Total: 278

Beit Mirsim is a Palestinian village in the city of Dura in the Hebron Governorate, located southwest of Hebron, 30 kilometres (19 mi) south of the West Bank.

== History ==
Ceramics from the Byzantine era have been found here.

In 1838 Beit Mirsim was noted as being "in ruins or deserted." In 1863 Victor Guérin described it: "This place is the ruin of a little city, not a village, which stood on the plateau of a high rocky hill. Hundreds of circular heaps of stone, cut or roughly squared, remains of over-thrown houses, lie round caves or cellars cut in the rock. Some of these subterranean retreats are natural grottoes; the others are cut by the hand of man. ... To the west is a Tell, the Tell Mirsim. It is of very regular form, and the plateau on its summit has a circumference of 600 paces. It is now cultivated, but it appears to have been formerly surrounded by an enclosing wall rudely constructed. Materials from this wall or from other buildings now destroyed lie about here and there.' In 1883, the PEF's Survey of Western Palestine described Khurbet Beit Mirsim: "A large ruin, looks like a ruined fortress to protect the road. A small ruined chapel with columns exists to the north."

In the 1931 census the population of Beit Mirsim was counted under Dura.

In 1961, under Jordanian rule, the population of Beit Mirsim was 226 people,

== Population ==
In 2007, according to the census, the population was 278.

== Geography ==
It is 500 metres (1,600 ft) above sea level. It is bordered to the east and north by the villages of Beit ar-Rush al-Fauqa and Abu Suhweila, and to the west and south by the village of al-Burj and the West Bank barrier.

== See also ==
- Dura, Hebron
- Tell Beit Mirsim
- Beit Mirsim

== Bibliography ==
- Conder, C.R.; Kitchener, H.H. (1883). The Survey of Western Palestine: Memoirs of the Topography, Orography, Hydrography, and Archaeology. Vol. 3. London: Committee of the Palestine Exploration Fund.
- Dauphin, C. (1998). La Palestine Byzantine, Peuplement et Populations. BAR International Series 726 (in French). Vol. III : Catalogue. Oxford: Archeopress. ISBN 0-860549-05-4.
- Government of Jordan, Department of Statistics (1964). First Census of Population and Housing. Volume I: Final Tables; General Characteristics of the Population (PDF).
- Guérin, Victor (1869). Description Géographique Historique et Archéologique de la Palestine (in French). Vol. 1: Judee, pt. 2. Paris: L'Imprimerie Nationale.
- Mills, E., ed. (1932). Census of Palestine 1931. Population of Villages, Towns and Administrative Areas. Jerusalem: Government of Palestine.
- Robinson, E.; Smith, E. (1841). Biblical Researches in Palestine, Mount Sinai and Arabia Petraea: A Journal of Travels in the year 1838. Vol. 3. Boston: Crocker & Brewster.
