= Khallet al-Aqed =

Khallet al-Aqed Arabic: خلة العقد
- Khallet al-Aqed
- Country: Palestine
- Governorate: Hebron Governorate
- Elevation: 750 m (2,460 ft)

Population (2007)
  - Total: 265

Khallet al-Aqed is a Palestinian village in the Dura district of the Hebron Governorate, south of the West Bank.

== Geography ==
It is located southwest of Hebron and is 750 meters above sea level.

== Population ==
The population of Khallet al-Aqd in 2007 was 265 people, according to the Palestinian Central Bureau of Statistics. The contract is managed by a village council jointly with the village of as-Sura.

== See also ==
- Dura, Hebron
- Hebron Governorate
