= Tarrama =

Village in West Bank, Palestine

- Local Development Committee

Arabic transcription(s)
  - Arabic: طرّامة
  - Latin: Khirbet al-Tarramah (official)
- Location of Tarrama within Palestine
- Coordinates: 31°28′51″N 35°01′57″E
- Palestine grid: 153/098
- State: State of Palestine
- Governorate: Hebron

Government
  - Type: Local Development Committee

Area
  - Total: 0.2 km^{2} (0.077 sq mi)

Population (2017)
  - Total: 642
  - Density: 3,200/km^{2} (8,300/sq mi)

Tarrama (Arabic: طرّامة, also known as Khirbet al-Tarramah) is a Palestinian village situated on a hilltop with an elevation of 879 meters (2,884 ft) in the southern West Bank, part of the Hebron Governorate. Located just south of Dura, nearby localities include at-Tabaqa to the north, Fawwar to the east, Khursa to the west, and Deir Razih to the south. The village had a population of 642 in 2017.

Its total land area is 210 dunams and the village is provided with electricity and telephone lines.

== History ==
Khirbet Tarrama has been suggested as a possible site of the "Jezreel" mentioned as a town in the territory of Judah in the Bible.

Ceramics from the Byzantine era have been found here.

=== Ottoman era ===
In 1863, Victor Guérin visited Tarrama, describing it thus:

We reach the top of a hill that rises in successive terraces, its slopes held in place by several supporting walls. A final surrounding wall—now demolished but still traceable—once enclosed the upper platform, where scattered heaps of large, disjointed blocks remain from a fairly strong structure, almost entirely destroyed, which appears to have served a military purpose. One also notices several caves cut into the rock, including one whose interior walls are pierced with a multitude of small niches resembling pigeonholes. These ruins are known to me by the name Khirbet Terrama.

In 1883, the PEF's Survey of Western Palestine (SWP) noted of Khurbet Terrama: "This ruin, not on the map, was found by Guerin about half an hour north of Khurbet Deir Razi. It was on the top of a terraced hill, and contains the remains of an old fort, with caves cut in the rock, one of which is pierced with columbaria."

=== British Mandate era ===
At the time of the 1931 census of Palestine, conducted by the British Mandate authorities, the population of Kh. Tarama was counted under Dura.

=== Jordanian era ===
In the wake of the 1948 Arab–Israeli War, and after the 1949 Armistice Agreements, Tarrama came under Jordanian rule.

In 1961, there were 161 residents here.

=== Post-1967 ===
After the Six-Day War in 1967, Tarrama has been under Israeli occupation.

During the 1970s, the Israeli Military unsuccessfully attempted to establish a military air field on Tarrama's lands to serve the al-Majnouna camp.

Most of its inhabitants belong to the Awlad Muhammad extended family, but over 10% were Palestinian refugees in 1997.

The population increased to 404 by 1997.

In 2007, Tarrama had a population of 630, according to the Palestinian Central Bureau of Statistics census.

== Bibliography ==
- Conder, C.R.; Kitchener, H.H. (1883). The Survey of Western Palestine: Memoirs of the Topography, Orography, Hydrography, and Archaeology. Vol. 3. London: Committee of the Palestine Exploration Fund.
- Dauphin, C. (1998). La Palestine byzantine, Peuplement et Populations. BAR International Series 726 (in French). Vol. III : Catalogue. Oxford: Archeopress. ISBN 0-860549-05-4.
- Government of Jordan, Department of Statistics (1964). First Census of Population and Housing. Volume I: Final Tables; General Characteristics of the Population (PDF).
- Guérin, V. (1869). Description Géographique Historique et Archéologique de la Palestine (in French). Vol. 1: Judee, pt. 3. Paris: L'Imprimerie Nationale.
- Mills, E., ed. (1932). Census of Palestine 1931. Population of Villages, Towns and Administrative Areas. Jerusalem: Government of Palestine.
