= Bani Na'im =

Bani Na'im بني نعيم (Arabic)
- Municipality type A (City)

Arabic transcription(s)
  - Arabic: بني نعيم
  - Latin: Kafr Barik (official); Bani Nu'aym (unofficial)
- Location of Bani Na'im within Palestine
- Coordinates: 31°30′58″N 35°09′51″E
- Palestine grid: 165/102
- State: Palestine
- Governorate: Hebron

Government
  - Type: City
  - Head of Municipality: Issa Hassan al-Khdour

Population (2017)
  - Total: 24,628
- Name meaning: Tribe of Na'im (or Nu'aym)
- Website: Bani Na'im Municipality

Bani Na'im (Arabic: بني نعيم, romanized: Banī Naʾīm, lit. 'children of bliss') is a town in the southern West Bank located 8 kilometers (5.0 mi) east of Hebron in the Hebron Governorate of Palestine. It is situated at a higher elevation than most localities in the area, with an altitude of 951 meters (3,120 ft). The town is best known as the burial place of Lot, a fact already mentioned around 400 CE, when it was known as 'Caphar Barucha'. Following the Muslim conquest, its name was eventually Arabicized as Kafr al-Burayk. The tomb of Lot was turned into a mosque during Islamic rule and remained so under Crusader rule. Later, the Arab tribe of Bani Nu'aym settled there, giving the town its current name, Bani Na'im, first used by Muslim scholar Abd al-Ghani al-Nabulsi in 1690.

During the late 1930s, the population took part in the Arab Revolt against the British Mandate. Following the 1948 Arab–Israeli War, the town came under Jordanian rule. Since the 1967 Six-Day War, Bani Na'im has been occupied by Israel; since 1995, it has been governed by the Palestinian National Authority (PNA). In 2017 the town had a population of 24,628.

== History ==
=== Byzantine period and association with Lot ===
Biblical scholar Edward Robinson identified the site with the Latin placename Caphar Barucha (Hebrew: כּפר בּרָכָה, romanized: Kp̄ar brāḵā, lit. 'Village of Blessing') mentioned by Jerome (fl. around 400) in connection with Abraham and Lot. Jerome wrote that Paula of Rome, departing from Hebron, stopped at the height of Caphar Barucha and looked upon the surrounding region, remembering Lot and his sin. According to Jerome, Abraham observed the destruction of Sodom and Gomorrah from that location. The name Caphar Barucha sometimes appears in literature in the form Caparbaricha.

Euthymius the Great established a monastery at Caparbaricha in 422; it is likely the ruins at Ein el-Skhaniya.

Several Byzantine period stones that had been reused in later structures have been found in the village. One is embedded in the mosque's surrounding wall and bears a broken cross. The mosque has possibly replaced an earlier church.

=== Early Muslim to Mamluk periods ===
Following the Muslim conquest of the Levant, the name of the village eventually took the Arabic form Kafr Burayk, or in its vernacular form Kefr Breik or Ibreik. Ali of Herat passed through the village in 1173 CE, noting that it was near Hebron and the burial place of Lot. Along with the town of Dura, Kafr Burayk became a part of the waqf (endowment) for the Ibrahimi Mosque (Cave of the Patriarchs) in Hebron on orders from the Ayyubid ruler of Damascus, al-Mu'azzam Isa, on 2 May 1215. The 15th-century Muslim geographer al-Suyuti also acknowledged that Lot was buried in Kafr Burayk and that in a cave west of the village, beneath an old mosque, laid "sixty prophets of whom twenty were Apostles". He noted that Lot's tomb was a site of "visitation and veneration from ancient times, the men of the age succeeding those who have gone before".

=== Ottoman period ===
Kafr Burayk was included in the Ottoman tax registers of 1596, where it was listed in the nahiya of Khalil (Hebron) of the Liwa of Quds (Jerusalem). It had a population of 42 Muslim households who paid a fixed tax rate of 25% on various agricultural products, including wheat, barley, vineyards or fruit trees, grape syrup or molasses, and goats or beehives; a total of 10,500 akçe. For much of the latter half of Ottoman rule, the village was under the administration of the Mutasarrifate of Jerusalem.

The first known mention of the name 'Bani Na'im' was by the Muslim traveler Abd al-Ghani al-Nabulsi in 1690. He wrote that the village had been known as 'Kafr al-Barik' and "now it is called Qaryat Bani Nu'aym in a diminutive form". It received this name from the Bedouins of Banu Nu'aym, also referred to as the Bani Na'im, who settled there after migrating from the vicinity of Petra in the Transjordan. Until the end of the 19th century, the early Arabic name was still known by the residents, as mentioned by Western travelers.

The biblical scholar Edward Robinson visited Bani Na'im in 1838, noting that it was a village with a mosque, "lying on very high ground, to which the ascent is gradual on every side, forming a conspicuous object to all the region far and near". He noted that its homes were "built of large hewn stones" and that the inhabitants, like other peasants in the area, lived in the houses in autumn and winter and took up abode in tents and caves in the spring to tend their flocks and cultivate their grain fields.

When the French traveler Victor Guérin visited in 1860, he found the village almost deserted since the population had left to live in tents as nomads to avoid military conscription. He found them living in a tent village one kilometer away, ready to flee to the desert if an attempt was made to enlist them. However, in 1874 the Palestine Exploration Fund's Survey of Western Palestine (SWP) described it as "a good-sized village" bordered by olive groves to the south and west with many structures built out of ancient materials. The residences there were mostly one-story stone cabins. In their second visit in 1881, the SWP described Bani Na'im as well-cultivated with abundant flocks that grazed in desert areas east of the town. The town was a major supplier of sand for the Hebron glass industry.

=== British Mandate ===
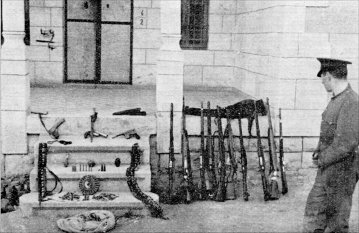
Weapons captured by British forces after battling Palestinian Arab irregulars in Bani Na'im during the 1936–39 Arab revolt in Palestine

In 1924, under British Mandatory rule, the first government school in Bani Na'im was founded. It joined the 1936–39 Arab revolt as the site of a battle between the irregular Palestinian Arab forces of Abd al-Qadir al-Husayni and the British Army. In December 1937, British forces ordered the demolition of a house whose owners were accused of involvement in an anti-British incident near the town. They fined Bani Na'im's mukhtars (village headmen) 50 British pounds and ordered the residents to carry 200 kilograms of explosives to the building for its demolition and watch the explosion as a deterrent measure.

Palestinian Arab irregulars led by al-Husayni and his local deputy, Abd al-Halim Jawlani, battled the British Army in Bani Na'im in December 1938. According to British military accounts, a resident of Bani Na'im called for intervention when the rebels entered the town. Israeli scholar Hillel Cohen wrote that Fakhri Nashashibi, a political rival of al-Husayni, informed military authorities on three rebel units forcing Bani Na'im's largely pro-Nashashibi inhabitants to join the revolt. The British promptly confronted a force of 100 irregulars. With British Air Force assistance, al-Husayni's troops dispersed and fled east of Bani Na'im where they were pinned down. British forces killed 60 rebels and captured 15. One British soldier was killed.

=== 1948 war and Jordanian annexation ===
In the wake of the 1948 Arab–Israeli War, and after the 1949 Armistice Agreements, Bani Na'im came under Jordanian rule.

== 1967 war and aftermath ==
In June 1967, after the Six-Day War, the town came under Israeli occupation along with the rest of the West Bank.

Both Bani Na'im and Hebron have grown massively during the late 20th century, practically merging into one inhabited area.

In 1997, in the wake of the 1995 Interim Agreement on the West Bank and the Gaza Strip, administrative control over Bani Na'im was transferred to the jurisdiction of the Palestinian National Authority (PNA). It concurrently became a municipality. Today, Bani Na'im serves as a commercial center for Hebron area villages, although most government services are in Hebron.

=== Conflict and casualties ===
In 1982, an 18-year-old resident of the town was shot and killed by Jewish settlers from nearby Kiryat Arba. In 1987, during the First Intifada, a committee against the Israeli occupation was set up in Bani Na'im. In May 1988, two residents were killed by the Israeli army (IDF) in the center of the town. On August 31, 2010, four Israelis, two men and two women, were killed in a Hamas drive-by shooting on the road between Kiryat Arba and Bani Na'im. The attack was condemned by Israel and the PNA. In October 2023, a 16-year old Palestinian, Munes Ziyadan, was fatally shot by the IDF.

== Tombs of Lot and Nabi Yaqin ==
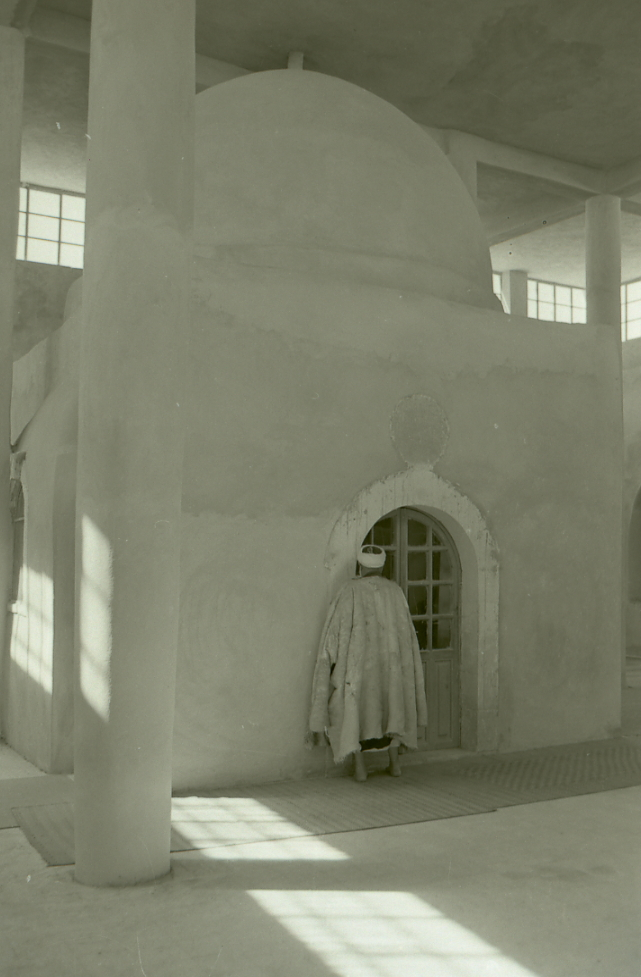
The Tomb of Lot near Bani Na'im, 1968

Bani Na'im houses the purported tomb of Lot, a prophet in Islam and a righteous person in Judaism and Christianity, in the center of the town. The tomb is located within a rectangular mosque that contains an inner court and minaret. The lintel of the mosque's northern gate is built from stones dating to the Byzantine era when a church had possibly stood. Lot's tomb was first mentioned by Saint Jerome, then by John of Wirtzburg in 1100, and Ali of Herat in 1173. While the Crusaders, who ruled the area from 1148 to 1187, were aware the tomb belonged to Lot, it remained a Muslim sanctuary. In 1322, writer Sir John Mandeville noted "two miles from Hebron, is the grave of Lot, Abraham's brother". Ibn Battuta noted in 1326 that the tomb was covered by a "fine building" made of white stone and without columns. Muslim writers al-Suyuti and Mujir ad-Din wrote in the 15th and 16th centuries, respectively, that Lot was buried in Bani Na'im. Tawfiq Canaan, a researcher of Palestinian popular heritage, described the golden embroidered writing on the red silk cloth covering the tomb as reading, "This is the tomb of prophet Lut, peace be upon him".

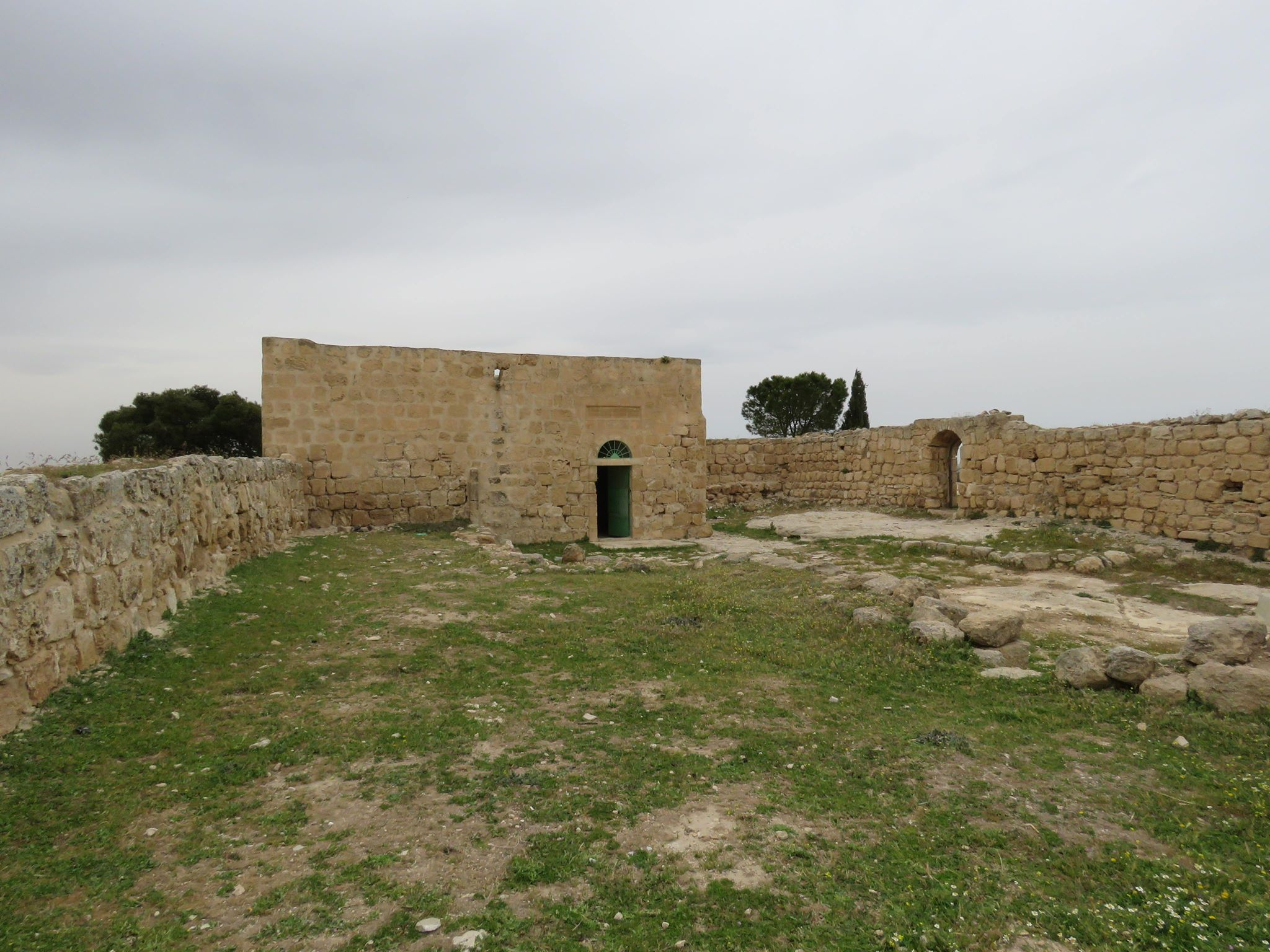
Maqam an-Nabi Yaqin from the east

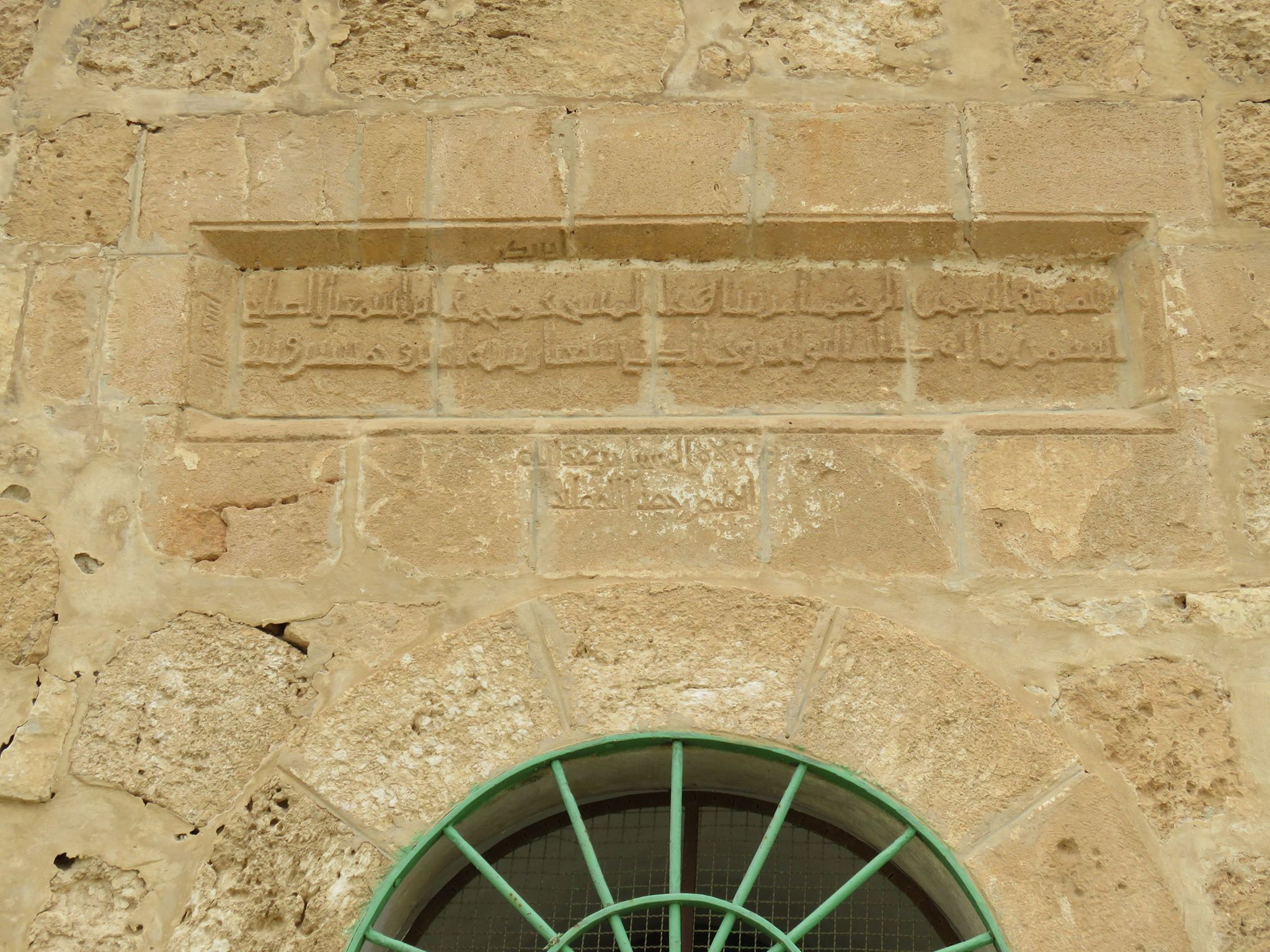
Maqam an-Nabi Yaqin inscription

Islamic-era Kufic inscriptions on the front entrance to the mosque state that the Muslim scholar Abdullah bin Muhammad declared:

… the hills, the plains, the buildings, the paths, the gardens, the trees and the passage that transverses it [Bani Na'im]" are an endowment "for the prophet Lot, the son of Haran brother of Ibrahim (Abraham), the friend of the Compassionate (Allah), may the blessings of Allah be upon them.

According to Muslim tradition, Lot lived in Bani Na'im before moving to Sodom. The shrine encasing the tomb was restored in 1410 by the Mamluk sultan an-Nasir Faraj, son of Sultan Barquq. The restoration work was entrusted by him to Shams al-Din al-Ansari, a member of the prominent Ansari family which specialized in religious endowments.

The purported tomb of Lot's daughters are on an opposite hill nearby. To the southeast of Bani Na'im is a separate shrine dedicated to Lot, known as Maqam an-Nabi Yaqin ('Shrine of the Truthful Prophet') Local legend claims Lot prayed at the site and that imprints of his feet in a rock there are visible. According to Muslim and Christian tradition, Bani Na'im is the place where Abraham, after the departure of the angels, saw the smoke of Sodom and Gomorrah "rising as the smoke of a furnace".

== Geography and climate ==
Bani Naim forms a generally rough rectangular layout, and widens in the northwest and southwest. The town covers a mountainous area, with an average altitude of 958 meters (3,143 ft) above sea level. It is 7 kilometers (4.3 mi) to 8 kilometers (5.0 mi) southeast of Hebron, though the two localities have practically merged. The Israeli settlement of Kiryat Arba is situated northwest of Bani Na'im, between it and Hebron. To its south lies the village of Hureiz and the town of Yatta, to the north are Sa'ir and ash-Shuyukh, while Halhul and the forest of Hebron lie to the west. Bani Na'im's lands extend east to the mountains that overlook the Dead Sea.

Bani Na'im's total land area is about 157,000 dunams, but the town's built-up area is roughly 2,500 dunams. The town itself is mostly located in Area A (Palestinian security and civilian administration) and Area B (Palestinian civil administration and Israeli military control.) The nearby town of ar-Rawa'in to the east is located within Bani Na'im's municipal jurisdiction and is under Area A. However, the Israeli settlement of Ma'ale Hever which was established in 1982, has a population of 400 and is also located within the Bani Na'im's municipal borders, comes under full Israeli control. Most of Bani Na'im's lands (59.6%) fall under Area C, or full Israeli security and civilian administration.

Average annual rainfall in Bani Na'im is 369 millimeters (14.5 in). The average temperature is 16 °C (61 °F) and the average annual humidity is 61%.

== Demographics ==
An Ottoman village list of about 1870 showed that Bani Na'im had 67 houses and a population of 145, though the population count included only men. In a census conducted in 1922 by the British Mandate authorities, Bani Na'im had a population of 1,279 inhabitants, all Muslims, rising to 1,646 Muslims, in 320 houses, according to the 1931 census. In the 1945 statistics, it increased to 2,160 according to an official land and population survey. Under Jordanian rule, in 1952, the population surged to 5,778, partly due to large numbers of Palestinian refugees who settled in the town as a result of the 1948 Arab-Israeli War. Later, the number of inhabitants declined due to the emigration of refugees from the town to other parts of the West Bank and Jordan. In 1961, the population of Bani Na'im was 3,392. By 1967, there were 4,271 inhabitants, gradually increasing to 6,703. In 1987, the population rose to roughly 7,600. In the 1997 census by the Palestinian Central Bureau of Statistics (PCBS), Bani Na'im had 13,535 inhabitants of whom 604 were refugees. The gender distribution was 6,779 males and 6,756 females.

In the 2007 census, there were 20,084 people living in the town and 217 in nearby Masaferet Bani Na'im which is located within the municipal jurisdiction. The gender makeup of Bani Na'im's population was 50.2% male and 49.8% female. There were 3,490 housing units and the average household size consisted of 6.5 family members. Then, Bani Na'im accounted for 3.67% of the Hebron Governorate's population and the town is officially considered an urban area. The inhabitants are Muslims and the town contains 16 mosques. The main families are al-Manasrah (the largest), Zeidan, Trayrah, Humeidat, Ubeid, Harahsheh and Amr. The population grew to 24,498 in the 2017 census, of whom 843 had refugee status.

== Government ==
Bani Na'im was established as a village council in 1971. After most of the built-up areas of Bani Na'im were transferred to Area A giving the Palestinian National Authority full control of the town, a municipal council was established on May 20, 1997. The first council was formed from the old members of the previous village council. The council was made up of seven members, while there were 18 municipal employees.

The amount of municipal seats was expanded to 13 during the Palestinian municipal elections in 2005. A local group, the Bani Na'im Martyrs list, won the most seats: five. The Al-Aqsa list won three seats, Independent lists also won three and the Hamas-backed Reform and Change list won the remaining two seats. Gender-wise, females won two seats and males eleven. Issa Hassan al-Khdour, member of the Bani Na'im Martyrs, had the most votes (3,281), and thus became the head of the municipality. In addition, the number of municipal employees increased to 30.

The municipal borders of Bani Na'im extend beyond the town and include the following villages: Birin, ar-Rawa'in and Masaferet Bani Na'im. The latter is a grouping of the following hamlets: Mantiqat al-Ein, Mantiqat as-Sahel, Mantiqat Qaber K'heil, Mantiqat Hilmi, Mantiqat al-Hamra, Mantiqat al-Qurun, Mantiqat al-Mathbah, Mantiqat as-Sweidat, Mantiqat Umm ar-Raqam and Khor Atara. Despite having a municipality, most official services are provided by the city of Hebron. However, Bani Na'im has a police station, a post office, and a local security office.

== Education and health ==
Bani Na'im has 14 schools: 7 boys' schools, 5 girls' schools and 2 co-educational schools. The first school was established in 1929. Consisting of one classroom, the enrollment at the time did not exceed 20 female and male students and the highest grade level was the fourth grade. According to the 2017 census, 96% of the population was literate; most of the illiterate population was female. A total of 3,908 students were in elementary school, 5,050 in preparatory school, and 3,194 in high school. 2,404 people had college diplomas.

Most of Bani Na'im's health facilities are privately owned. The town has a maternity hospital, five health clinics, three dental clinics and a physiotherapy center. The Palestinian Ministry of Health runs a childcare center and medical lab in the town, while an additional health center and an x-ray center are run by a charitable society. In addition, there are five pharmacies in Bani Na'im. In 2009, the town had one ambulance; residents travelled to Hebron for emergency treatment.

== Economy and infrastructure ==
Bani Na'im serves as a commercial center in the Hebron area. Approximately 50% of the labor force is engaged in the industrial and civil service sector. About 20% are employed in the Israeli labor market while 19% work in agriculture. Economic enterprises include four stone-cutting factories, a brick factory, a textile factory, an olive press, eleven metal workshops, four carpentry workshops, seven butcher shops, 13 clothing stores, and 110 other shops.

Decline in market demand combined with movement restrictions imposed by the Israeli military have led to a deterioration of the local economy, particularly in the trade and the stone-cutting industries. In 2017, unemployment reached 13.6%. Consequently, many unemployed persons began looking into agriculture to earn income. The most cultivated crops are grains, especially barley, followed by lentils and chick peas. A sizable segment of the population raise livestock and 10% breed their own domestic animals. In total, there are 144 cows, 7,000 goats, 14,000 sheep, and 500 beehives. Much of the town's agricultural products are sold in Hebron.

In 2017, there were 4,071 buildings in Bani Na'im, of which 3,301 were houses and 580 were solely working establishments. Pipe water reaches more than 95% of the residents. The water pipe line, 2.5 kilometers (1.6 mi) in length, is linked to the main water supply of the Israeli settlement of Efrat, south of Bethlehem. Around 9 kilometers (5.6 mi) of main and sub lines were recently repaired. The cost of this project was roughly one million NIS.

In 1994, Bani Na'im was linked to the electricity grid and the municipality installed street lights. Before then, generators operated for five hours daily at most and for house use only.

== Bibliography ==
- Barron, J.B., ed. (1923). Palestine: Report and General Abstracts of the Census of 1922. Government of Palestine.
- Canaan, T. (1927). Mohammedan Saints and Sanctuaries in Palestine. London: Luzac & Co.
- Cohen, H. (2009). Army of Shadows: Palestinian Collaboration with Zionism, 1917–1948. University of California Press. ISBN 978-0-520-25989-8.
- Conder, C.R.; Kitchener, H.H. (1883). The Survey of Western Palestine: Memoirs of the Topography, Orography, Hydrography, and Archaeology. Vol. 3. London: Committee of the Palestine Exploration Fund.
- Finn, J. (1877). Byeways in Palestine. London: James Nisbet.
- Government of Jordan, Department of Statistics (1964). First Census of Population and Housing. Volume I: Final Tables; General Characteristics of the Population (PDF).
- Government of Palestine, Department of Statistics (1945). Village Statistics, April, 1945.
- Grehan, James (2016). Twilight of the Saints: Everyday Religion in Ottoman Syria and Palestine. Oxford University Press. ISBN 978-0-19-937303-1.
- Guérin, V. (1869). Description Géographique Historique et Archéologique de la Palestine (in French). Vol. 1: Judee, pt. 3. Paris: L'Imprimerie Nationale.
- Hadawi, S. (1970). Village Statistics of 1945: A Classification of Land and Area ownership in Palestine. Palestine Liberation Organization Research Centre.
- Hartmann, M. (1883). "Die Ortschaftenliste des Liwa Jerusalem in dem türkischen Staatskalender für Syrien auf das Jahr 1288 der Flucht (1871)". Zeitschrift des Deutschen Palästina-Vereins. 6: 102–149.
- Hütteroth, W.-D.; Abdulfattah, K. (1977). Historical Geography of Palestine, Transjordan and Southern Syria in the Late 16th Century. Erlanger Geographische Arbeiten, Sonderband 5. Erlangen, Germany: Vorstand der Fränkischen Geographischen Gesellschaft. ISBN 3-920405-41-2.
- Lockman, Zackary; Beinin, J., eds. (1989). Intifada: The Palestinian Uprising Against Israeli Occupation. South End Press. ISBN 0-89608-363-2.
- Le Strange, G. (1890). Palestine Under the Moslems: A Description of Syria and the Holy Land from A.D. 650 to 1500. Committee of the Palestine Exploration Fund.
- Mills, E., ed. (1932). Census of Palestine 1931. Population of Villages, Towns and Administrative Areas. Jerusalem: Government of Palestine.
- Palmer, E.H. (1881). The Survey of Western Palestine: Arabic and English Name Lists Collected During the Survey by Lieutenants Conder and Kitchener, R. E. Transliterated and Explained by E.H. Palmer. Committee of the Palestine Exploration Fund.
- Pringle, D. (1993). The Churches of the Crusader Kingdom of Jerusalem: A-K (excluding Acre and Jerusalem). Vol. I. Cambridge University Press. ISBN 0-521-39036-2.
- Robinson, E.; Smith, E. (1841). Biblical Researches in Palestine, Mount Sinai and Arabia Petraea: A Journal of Travels in the year 1838. Vol. 2. Boston: Crocker & Brewster. (p. 554)
- Sharon, M. (1999). Corpus Inscriptionum Arabicarum Palaestinae, B-C. Vol. 2. Brill. ISBN 90-04-11083-6.
- Socin, A. (1879). "Alphabetisches Verzeichniss von Ortschaften des Paschalik Jerusalem". Zeitschrift des Deutschen Palästina-Vereins. 2: 135–163.
- Watzman, H. (2007). Company C: An American's Life as a Citizen-Soldier in Israel. Macmillan. ISBN 978-0-374-53085-3.
