= Wadi ash-Shajina =

Village in West Bank, Palestine

- Municipality type D (village council)

Arabic transcription(s)
  - Arabic: وادي الشاجنةر
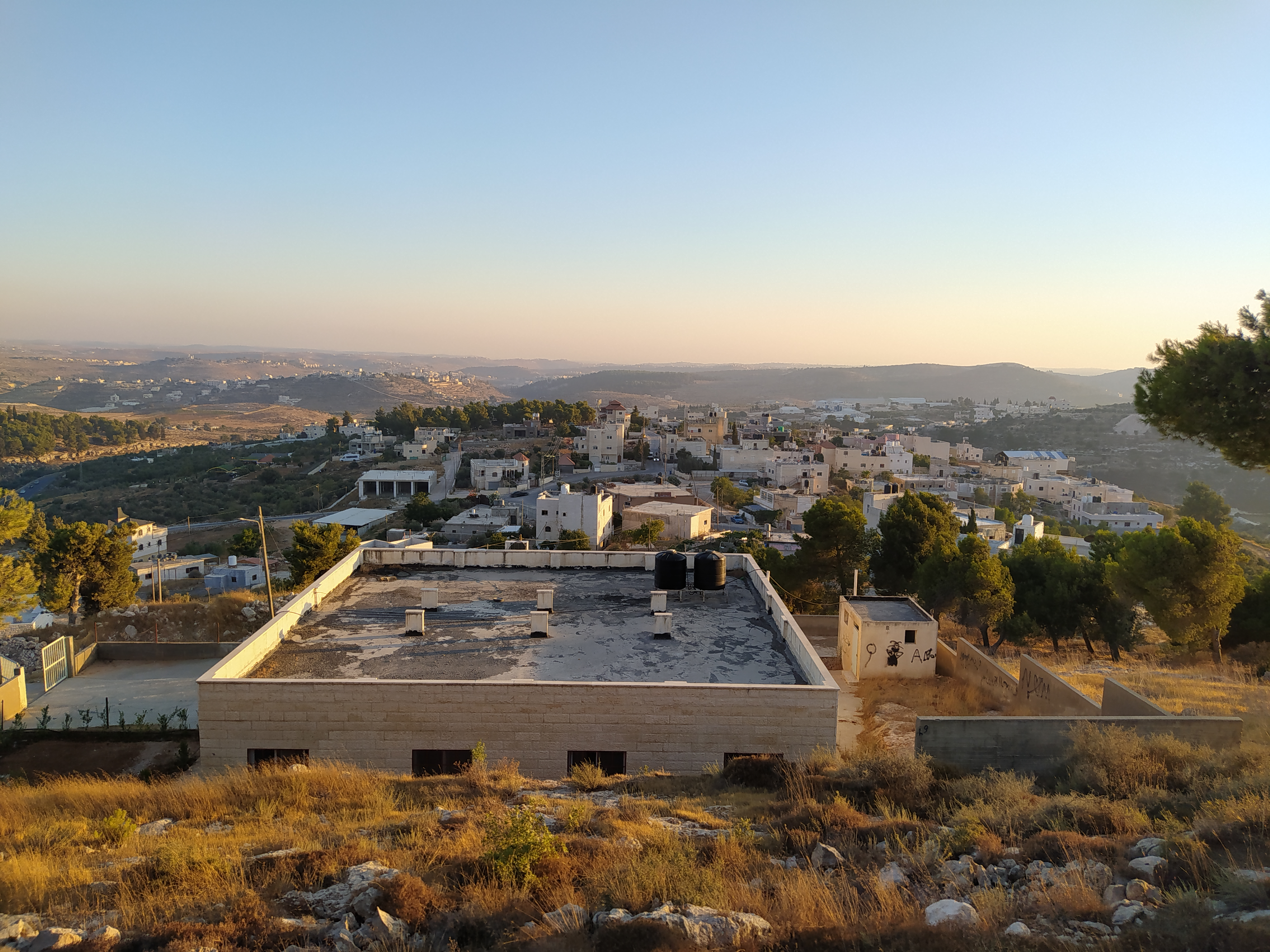
- Wadi ash-Shajina in 2020

- Location of Wadi ash-Shajina within Palestine
- Coordinates: 31°28′6″N 35°1′50″E
- State: State of Palestine
- Governorate: Hebron

Government
  - Type: Village council

Population (2017)
  - Total: 762
- Name meaning: Shagna Valley

Wadi ash-Shajina (English: Shagna Valley) is a Palestinian village in the Hebron Governorate, in the south of the West Bank. The village had a population of 762 in 2017.
