= Beit 'Amra =

Village in West Bank, Palestine

- Municipality type D (Village council)

Arabic transcription(s)
  - Arabic: خربة بيت عمرة
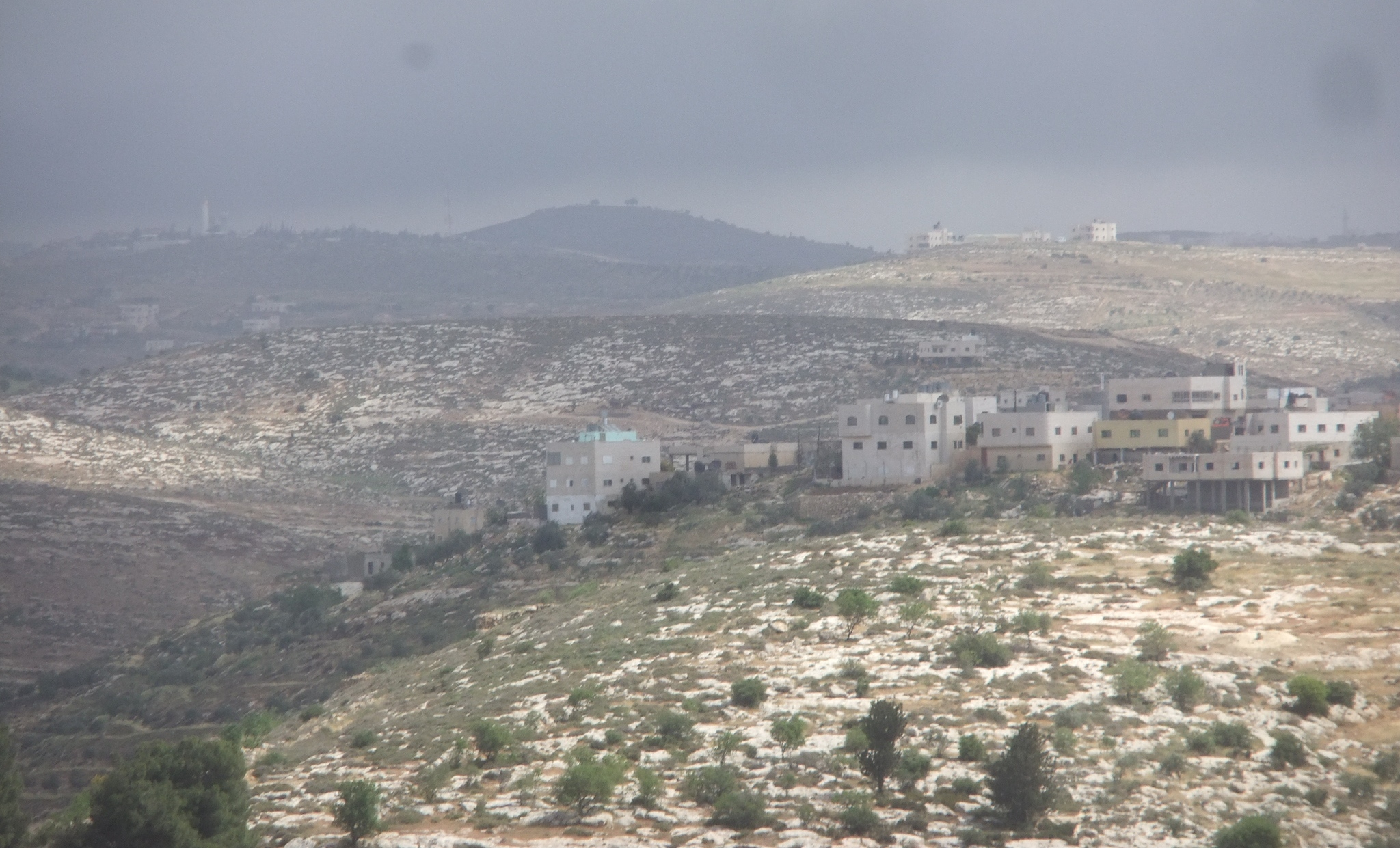
- Beit 'Amra

- Location of Beit 'Amra within Palestine
- Coordinates: 31°26′53″N 35°03′13″E
- Palestine grid: 155/095
- State: Palestine
- Governorate: Hebron

Government
  - Type: Village council

Population (2017)
  - Total: 3,607
- Name meaning: The ruin of the house of ’Amra

Beit 'Amra (Arabic: خربة بيت عمرة) is a Palestinian village located twelve kilometers southwest of Hebron. The village is in the Hebron Governorate Southern West Bank. According to the Palestinian Central Bureau of Statistics, the village had a population of 3,607 in 2017.

== History ==
=== Ancient period ===
Beit 'Amra is believed to be identical with Beit 'Amar, a site mentioned in a document dating from the second century CE, in which a Jewish widow declared her rights fulfilled. The document, written in Hebrew and Aramaic on papyrus and said to be signed at Beit 'Amar, also mentions two other villages in the southern Hebron Hills: Aristobolia and Upper Anab. The document is self-dated to the "year four of the destruction of the House of Israel", which scholars believe refers to 4th year after the suppression of the Bar Kokhba revolt, thus dating the document to circa 140 CE. This document indicates that Jews remained in the southern Hebron Hills in the aftermath of the revolt.

Potsherds from the early Roman period were found at Khirbet Beit 'Amra.

=== Ottoman period ===
French explorer Victor Guérin visited the place in 1863, which he described as a ruin. He noted that "these ruins extend over a large hill, whose lower parts are provided with sustaining walls. A good many cisterns are cut in the sides of the hill. Several of these are provided with the stones intended to stop the orifice. On all sides are to be seen old subterranean magazines, once belonging to houses now destroyed, the ruins of which are covered with brushwood. The vestiges of two churches, almost completely destroyed, are still visible. They are both built east and west; one occupied the higher part of the village, the other the lower. On the site of the first, among other things, are the fragments of a baptismal font."

In 1883, the PEF's Survey of Western Palestine found it to be a "ruined site on a hill, resembling Khurbet 'Aziz in character. Cisterns, ruined walls, shafts of pillars, and lintel stones were observed".

=== British Era ===
Control of the village passed to the British after they defeated the Ottoman Empire in World War 1. The area was administered until 1948 as the British Mandate for Palestine.

=== Jordanian Era ===
In the wake of the 1948 Arab–Israeli War, and after the 1949 Armistice Agreements, Beit 'Amra came under Jordanian rule.

The Jordanian census of 1961 found 119 inhabitants in Beit 'Amra.

=== Post-1967 ===
Since the Six-Day War in 1967, Beit 'Amra has been under Israeli occupation.

== Bibliography ==
- Conder, C.R.; Kitchener, H.H. (1883). The Survey of Western Palestine: Memoirs of the Topography, Orography, Hydrography, and Archaeology. Vol. 3. London: Committee of the Palestine Exploration Fund.
- Government of Jordan, Department of Statistics (1964). First Census of Population and Housing. Volume I: Final Tables; General Characteristics of the Population (PDF).
- Guérin, V. (1869). Description Géographique Historique et Archéologique de la Palestine (in French). Vol. 1: Judee, pt. 3. Paris: L'Imprimerie Nationale.
- Palmer, E.H. (1881). The Survey of Western Palestine: Arabic and English Name Lists Collected During the Survey by Lieutenants Conder and Kitchener, R. E. Transliterated and Explained by E.H. Palmer. Committee of the Palestine Exploration Fund.
