= Al-Heila =

al-Heila
- Municipality type D (Village council)

Arabic transcription(s)
  - Arabic: الحيلة
- Location of al-Heila within Palestine
- Coordinates: 31°28′24″N 35°06′26″E
- State: State of Palestine
- Governorate: Hebron

Government
  - Type: Village council

Population (2007)
  - Total: 1,277

al-Heila (Arabic: الحيلة) is a Palestinian village located eight kilometers south of Hebron. The village is in the Hebron Governorate Southern West Bank. According to the Palestinian Central Bureau of Statistics, the village had a population of 1,277 in 2007. The primary health care facilities for the village are designated by the Ministry of Health as level 1.
