= Ar-Rihiya =

ar-Rihiya
- Municipality type D (Village council)

Arabic transcription(s)
  - Arabic: ريحيا
- Location of ar-Rihiya within Palestine
- Coordinates: 31°28′13″N 35°04′30″E
- Palestine grid: 157/097
- State: State of Palestine
- Governorate: Hebron

Government
  - Type: Village council

Population (2017)
  - Total: 5,754
- Name meaning: Possibly "The coiled-up snake"

Ar-Rihiya (Arabic: ريحيا) is a Palestinian town located six kilometers southwest of Hebron. The town is in the Hebron Governorate southern West Bank. According to the Palestinian Central Bureau of Statistics, the town had a population of over 5,754 in 2017.

== History ==
Ceramics from the Byzantine era have been found here.

=== Ottoman period ===
Oral tradition suggests that Ar-Rihiya was founded after the 16th century. The village likely originated in the 19th century, founded by Kurds from Tubas who grazed their herds in the vicinity. Before the establishment of the village, they dwelled in nearby caves.

French explorer Victor Guérin visited the place in 1863, which he called Khirbet el-Harayeh. Local fellahins inhabited ancient underground storage areas.

In 1883, the PEF's Survey of Western Palestine described the place as being a "large ruin with caves and cisterns, appears to be an ancient site".

=== British Mandate ===
In the 1922 census of Palestine conducted by the British Mandate authorities, 'Al Rihiyeh had a population 231 inhabitants, all Muslims. This had increased slightly at the time of the 1931 census to 243 Muslims, in 38 inhabited houses.

In the 1945 statistics the population of Ar-Rihiya was 330 Muslims, who owned 2,659 dunams of land according to an official land and population survey. 136 dunams were plantations and irrigable land, 1,093 for cereals, while 25 dunams were built-up (urban) land.

=== Jordanian rule ===
In the wake of the 1948 Arab–Israeli War, and after the 1949 Armistice Agreements, Ar-Rihiya came under Jordanian rule. It was annexed by Jordan in 1950.

In 1961, the population of Rihiya was 555.

=== Post-1967 ===
Since the Six-Day War in 1967, Ar-Rihiya has been under Israeli occupation.

== Bibliography ==
- Barron, J.B., ed. (1923). Palestine: Report and General Abstracts of the Census of 1922. Government of Palestine.
- Conder, C.R.; Kitchener, H.H. (1883). The Survey of Western Palestine: Memoirs of the Topography, Orography, Hydrography, and Archaeology. Vol. 3. London: Committee of the Palestine Exploration Fund.
- Dauphin, C. (1998). La Palestine byzantine, Peuplement et Populations. BAR International Series 726 (in French). Vol. III : Catalogue. Oxford: Archeopress. ISBN 0-860549-05-4.
- Government of Jordan, Department of Statistics (1964). First Census of Population and Housing. Volume I: Final Tables; General Characteristics of the Population (PDF).
- Government of Palestine, Department of Statistics (1945). Village Statistics, April, 1945.
- Guérin, V. (1869). Description Géographique Historique et Archéologique de la Palestine (in French). Vol. 1: Judee, pt. 3. Paris: L'Imprimerie Nationale.
- Hadawi, S. (1970), Village Statistics of 1945: A Classification of Land and Area ownership in Palestine, Palestine Liberation Organization Research Center
- Mills, E., ed. (1932). Census of Palestine 1931. Population of Villages, Towns and Administrative Areas. Jerusalem: Government of Palestine.
- Palmer, E.H. (1881). The Survey of Western Palestine: Arabic and English Name Lists Collected During the Survey by Lieutenants Conder and Kitchener, R. E. Transliterated and Explained by E.H. Palmer. Committee of the Palestine Exploration Fund.
