= Shuyukh al-Arrub =

- Municipality type D (Village council)

Arabic transcription(s)
  - Arabic: شيوخ العروب
- Location of Shuyukh al-Arrub within Palestine
- Coordinates: 31°36′57″N 35°08′51″E
- Palestine grid: 163/113
- State: State of Palestine
- Governorate: Hebron

Government
  - Type: Village council

Population (2017)
  - Total: 1,958
- Name meaning: Birket el Arrub, the well of Arrub

Shuyukh al-Arrub (Arabic: شيوخ العروب) is a Palestinian village located eleven kilometers north-east of Hebron. The village is in the Hebron Governorate Southern West Bank. According to the Palestinian Central Bureau of Statistics, the village had a population of 1,958 inhabitants in 2017. The primary health care facilities for the village are designated by the Ministry of Health as level 2.

== Location ==
Shuyukh al-Arrub is located 11 km north of Hebron City. It is bordered by Kuziba and Irqan Turad to the east, Beit Fajjar to the north, Halhul and Sa'ir to the south and Al 'Arrub Camp to the west.

== History ==
=== Roman period ===
See Solomon's Pools for the 39 kilometres (24 mi) long el-Arrub aqueduct built by the Roman prefect Pontius Pilate.

=== Mamluk period ===
In AH 892 (1487 CE), Qansuh Al Yahyawi, the Mamluk viceroy of Damascus, renewed the water supply from Ain al-Arrub (Arrub Spring).

=== Late Ottoman period ===
In the 1850s, people from Ash Shuyukh settled the area.

In 1883, the PEF's Survey of Western Palestine (SWP) described Birket el 'Arrub as: "one of the main reservoirs supplying the aqueduct to Jerusalem. There are two channels, one from Birket Kufin, one from 'Ain Kueiziba, which join [here]."

=== Jordanian period ===
In the wake of the 1948 Arab–Israeli War, and after the 1949 Armistice Agreements, Shuyukh al-Arrub came under Jordanian rule.

The Jordanian census of 1961 found 242 inhabitants in Shuyukh Arrub.

=== 1967 and aftermath ===
Since the 1967 Six-Day War, Shuyukh al-Arrub has been under Israeli occupation.

== Bibliography ==
- Conder, C.R.; Kitchener, H. H. (1883). The Survey of Western Palestine: Memoirs of the Topography, Orography, Hydrography, and Archaeology. Vol. 3. London: Committee of the Palestine Exploration Fund.
- Government of Jordan, Department of Statistics (1964). First Census of Population and Housing. Volume I: Final Tables; General Characteristics of the Population (PDF).
- Mayer, L.A. (1933). Saracenic Heraldry: A Survey. Oxford: Oxford University Press.
- Palmer, E.H. (1881). The Survey of Western Palestine: Arabic and English Name Lists Collected During the Survey by Lieutenants Conder and Kitchener, R. E. Transliterated and Explained by E.H. Palmer. Committee of the Palestine Exploration Fund.
