= Al-Uddeisa =

al-Uddeisa
- Municipality type D (Village council)

Arabic transcription(s)
- Location of al-Uddeisa within Palestine
- Coordinates: 31°32′35″N 35°08′36″E
- Palestine grid: 163/106
- State: State of Palestine
- Governorate: Hebron

Government
  - Type: Village council

Population (2006)
  - Total: 1,474

al-Uddeisa, also spelled Al 'Uddeisa, is a Palestinian village located four kilometers east of Hebron.The village is a locality of Sa'ir, in the Hebron Governorate Southern West Bank. According to the Palestinian Central Bureau of Statistics, the village had a population of 1,474 in mid-year 2006. The primary health care facilities for the village are designated by the Ministry of Health as level 1.

== History ==
In 1883 the PEF's Survey of Western Palestine found there "foundations, pillar-shafts and a large vaulted cistern. At the time, it was named Khurbet al Addeisiyeh, meaning "The ruin of the lentil-fields".

In 1961, under Jordanian rule, 'Udeisa had 179 inhabitants.

== Bibliography ==
- Conder, C.R.; Kitchener, H.H. (1883). The Survey of Western Palestine: Memoirs of the Topography, Orography, Hydrography, and Archaeology. Vol. 3. London: Committee of the Palestine Exploration Fund.
- Government of Jordan, Department of Statistics (1964). First Census of Population and Housing. Volume I: Final Tables; General Characteristics of the Population (PDF).
- Palmer, E.H. (1881). The Survey of Western Palestine: Arabic and English Name Lists Collected During the Survey by Lieutenants Conder and Kitchener, R. E. Transliterated and Explained by E.H. Palmer. Committee of the Palestine Exploration Fund.
