= Marah al-Baqqar =

Palestinian village

Marah al-Baqqar مراح البقار
- Marah al-Baqqar
- Location of Marah al-Baqqar within Palestine
- Country: Palestine
- Governorate: Hebron Governorate
- Elevation: 750 m (2,460 ft)

Population (2017)
  - Total: 299

Marah al-Baqqar (مراح البقار) is a Palestinian village in the Dura district of the Hebron Governorate, south of the West Bank. It is located west of the city of Hebron, at an elevation of 750 meters above sea level.

== Population ==
According to the 2017 Palestinian census, the population of Marah al-Baqar was approximately 299.

== See also ==
- Dura, Hebron
- Hebron Governorate
