= Kuseis =

Village in West Bank, Palestine

Kuseise
- Municipality type D (Village council)

Arabic transcription(s)
  - Arabic: كريسة الشرقية
  - Latin: Kureis (official); Kureisa al-Sharqiyya (unofficial)
- Location of Kuseise within Palestine
- Coordinates: 31°31′34″N 35°01′19″E
- Palestine grid: 152/103
- State: State of Palestine
- Governorate: Hebron

Government
  - Type: Village council

Population (2006)
  - Total: 2,276

Kuseise (Arabic: كريسة الشرقية) is a Palestinian village located seven kilometers west of Hebron. The village is in the Hebron Governorate Southern West Bank. According to the Palestinian Central Bureau of Statistics, the village had a population of 2,276 in mid-year 2006. The primary health care facilities for the village are designated by the Ministry of Health as level 1.
