= Khursa =

- Municipality type D (Village council)

Arabic transcription(s)
  - Arabic: خرسا
  - Latin: Khursa (official), Khursaʿ
- Location of Khursa within Palestine
- Coordinates: 31°28′58″N 35°1′2″E
- Palestine grid: 150/094
- State: State of Palestine
- Governorate: Hebron

Government
  - Type: Village council

Population (2017)
  - Total: 3,481

Khursa (Arabic: خرسا) is a Palestinian village located seven kilometers south-west of Hebron. The village is in the Hebron Governorate in the Southern West Bank. According to the Palestinian Central Bureau of Statistics, the village had a population of 3,481 in 2017. The primary health care facilities for the village are designated by the Ministry of Health as level 2.

== Etymology ==
According to Palmer, the name Khursa (Khursah) is derived from a personal name.

== History ==
According to an oral tradition from Dura, Khursa was destroyed in an attack by the people of Dura. This event probably happened during the seventeenth century CE. According to this story, those who lived in Khursa then moved to Bayt Jibrin.

In 1883, the PEF's Survey of Western Palestine described the site as having "walls, caves, a well, and a vault, probably a cistern. There were several cisterns and a sacred place to the west. Some of the ruins appear to be modern, some ancient."

== Modern history ==
In recent years, Khursa has experienced frequent incursions by Israeli forces. In 2025, troops raided the village and detained several young men, including Diaa Al-Amayreh, Nadim Faqousa, Osama Al-Shahatit, Hassan Al-Suwaiti, and Mohammad Adi Abu Hashem, interrogating them before release. In December 2023, two youths—Osama and Jihad Al-Shahanit—were arrested following raids on their homes. Local sources also cite the arrest of Kamel Mohammad Aqtayl by Israeli forces after a house search.

=== Infrastructure and settler / military pressures ===
In 2017, an Israeli guard post (pillbox) was placed within Khursa (Area A), ostensibly to protect illegal settlers driving through roads crossing village territory. NGOs condemned the move as a violation of the Oslo agreements. Machsom Watch documented that the village lies on a route toward the Negohot settlement, and noted the erection of a watchtower/checkpoint affecting local mobility. Historically, the village has also suffered from severe water shortages. An Al Jazeera report in 2003 described how the water supply was unreliable, infrastructure was dilapidated, and many residents relied on cisterns or buying water at high cost.

=== Fatal incidents / casualties ===
In September 2015, the death of a 19-year-old woman shot near Hebron was linked by Palestinian sources to Khursa; other reports connected the incident to a villager named Dia al-Talahmeh (aged 21). In 2025, forces were reported to have stormed Khursa to demolish a memorial for Diaa Al-Talahmeh.

== Bibliography ==
- Conder, C.R.; Kitchener, H.H. (1883). The Survey of Western Palestine: Memoirs of the Topography, Orography, Hydrography, and Archaeology. Vol. 3. London: Committee of the Palestine Exploration Fund.
- Palmer, E.H. (1881). The Survey of Western Palestine: Arabic and English Name Lists Collected During the Survey by Lieutenants Conder and Kitchener, R. E. Transliterated and Explained by E.H. Palmer. Committee of the Palestine Exploration Fund.
