= Deir al-Asal al-Tahta =

- Deir al-Asal al-Tahta, Arabic: دير العسل التحتا
- Location of Deir al-Asal al-Tahta Palestine
- Coordinates: 31°28′23.8526″N 34°56′52.1819″E
- State: Palestine
- Governorate: Hebron

Population (2017)
  - Total: 611

Deir al-Asal al-Tahta (Arabic: دير العسل التحتا) is a Palestinian village in the Hebron Governorate, south of the West Bank. It is located 18 km (11 miles) southwest of the city of Hebron.

== Population ==
In the 1961 census, under Jordanian rule, the village had a population of 248, and in the 2017 census, the population was 611.

== History ==
All of Palestine, including Deir al-Asal al-Tahta, fell to the Ottoman Empire in 1517.

In 1917, Deir al-Asal al-Tahta and the rest of Palestine fell to the British Army.

In the early 1950s, Deir al-Asal al-Tahta came under Jordanian rule and was administratively part of the Hebron District.

Deir al-Asal al-Tahta came under Israeli occupation after the 1967 Six-Day War.

After the establishment of the Palestinian Authority, the village was administratively part of the Hebron Governorate. In 1998, the Deir al-Asal al-Tahta Village Council was established.

== See also ==
- Dura, Hebron
- Hebron Governorate
