= Qilqis =

Qilqis قلقس (Arabic)
- Municipality type D (Village council)

Arabic transcription(s)
  - Arabic: قلقس
- Location of Qalqas within Palestine
- Coordinates: 31°29′31″N 35°05′48″E
- Palestine grid: 158/100
- State: State of Palestine
- Governorate: Hebron

Government
  - Type: Village council

Population (2017)
  - Total: 1,709
- Name meaning: "The ruin of potatoes"

Qilqis (Arabic: قلقس) is a Palestinian village located four kilometers south of Hebron and adjacent to the Israeli settlement of Beit Haggai. The village is in the Hebron Governorate in the Southern West Bank.

According to the Palestinian Central Bureau of Statistics, the village had a population of 1,709 in 2017. The primary health care facilities for the village are designated by the Ministry of Health as level 1.

== Geography ==
Qilqis lies immediately south of Hebron city, overlooking the road toward as-Samuʿ. The total area of village lands is about 2,500 dunums, much of it used for rain-fed agriculture, olive groves, and grazing. The village lies adjacent to the Israeli settlement of Beit Hagai, which has been built on land historically belonging to Qilqis.

== History ==
French explorer Victor Guérin visited the place in 1863, and described it as "the ruins of a large village".

In 1883, the Palestine Exploration Fund’s Survey of Western Palestine called the place Khurbet Kilkis. It was described as having "walls and cisterns, and rock-cut tombs".

During the 20th century, the village remained a small agricultural community within the Hebron hinterland. After the Six-Day War in 1967, Qilqis came under Israeli occupation, and parts of its land were confiscated for the nearby settlement of Beit Haggai.

== Demographics ==
The population was 110 in 1961. According to the Palestinian Central Bureau of Statistics, the village had a population of 1,709 in 2017. Families in the village are primarily dependent on agriculture and wage labor in Hebron, while a portion of the younger generation commutes to universities in the city.

== Infrastructure and services ==
The village is administered by a local village council (type D). Its primary health care facilities are classified by the Ministry of Health as level 1, providing basic first aid and preventive care.

The village has one boys’ and one girls’ school, and residents identify education as a top community priority. Electricity is supplied by the Hebron Electric Power Company, and water comes through the Palestinian Water Authority network, though villagers report shortages during the summer months.

== Development and challenges ==
Participatory assessments carried out by ARIJ in cooperation with the community have identified the most urgent needs of Qilqis: expansion of the school facilities, rehabilitation of agricultural lands, and improved water infrastructure.

Residents emphasize that despite land confiscations and mobility restrictions, they maintain strong attachment to their land and continue to cultivate olives, grapes, and cereals. Local oral histories stress the endurance of Qilqis as part of the social fabric of the southern Hebron hills, and villagers actively participate in cultural preservation initiatives linked to Hebron.

== Bibliography ==
- Conder, C.R.; Kitchener, H.H. (1883). The Survey of Western Palestine: Memoirs of the Topography, Orography, Hydrography, and Archaeology. Vol. 3. London: Committee of the Palestine Exploration Fund.
- Guérin, V. (1869). Description Géographique Historique et Archéologique de la Palestine (in French). Vol. 1: Judee, pt. 3. Paris: L'Imprimerie Nationale.
- Palmer, E.H. (1881). The Survey of Western Palestine: Arabic and English Name Lists Collected During the Survey by Lieutenants Conder and Kitchener, R. E. Transliterated and Explained by E.H. Palmer. Committee of the Palestine Exploration Fund.
