= Khallet Edar =

Village in Hebron Governorate, Palestine

Khallet Edar Arabic: خلة الدار
- Khallet Edar
- Location of Khallet Edar within Palestine
- Country: Palestine
- Governorate: Hebron Governorate

Population (2017)
  - Total: 2,984

Khallet Edar is a Palestinian village in the Hebron Governorate, located south of the city of Hebron in the southern West Bank.

== Population ==
According to the Palestinian Central Bureau of Statistics, the population of Khallet ad-Dar was approximately 2,984 in 2017.

== See also ==
- Hebron Governorate
