= Taffuh =

Taffuh تفُّوح
- Municipality type B

Arabic transcription(s)
  - Arabic: تفّوح
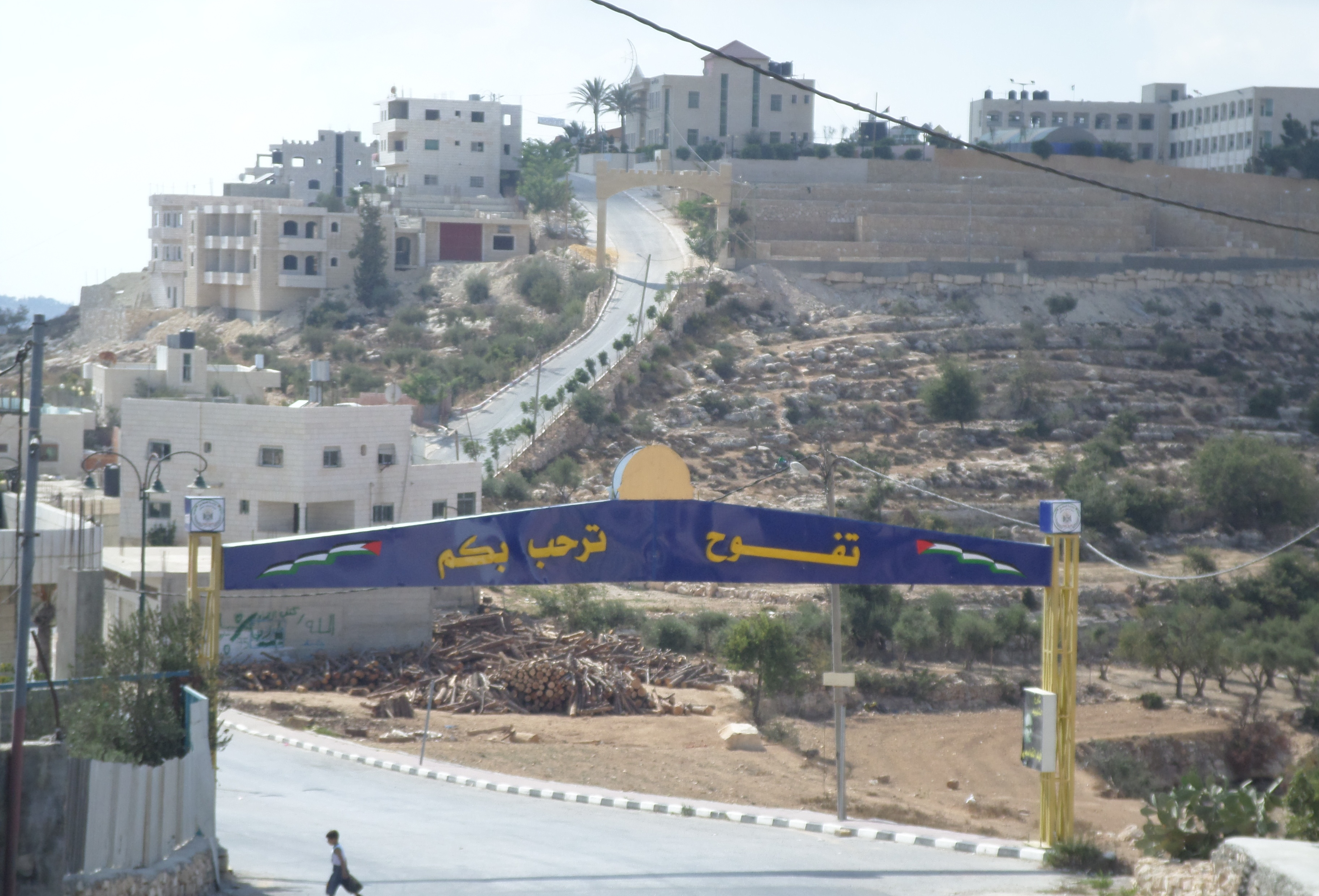
- Taffuh, in 2017

- Location of Taffuh within Palestine
- Coordinates: 31°32′21″N 35°3′11″E
- Palestine grid: 154/105
- State: State of Palestine
- Governorate: Hebron

Government
  - Type: Municipality

Population (2017)
  - Total: 15,800
- Name meaning: from "Beth Tappuah"

Taffuh (Arabic: تفّوح) (lit. fragrance) is a Palestinian town located eight kilometers west of Hebron. The town is in the Hebron Governorate in the southern West Bank. According to the Palestinian Central Bureau of Statistics, the town had a population of 15,800 in 2017.

== History ==
=== Biblical connection ===
The city of Beth-tappuah, literally House of Apple [tree], cited in the Book of Joshua (Josh 15: 53), is often located in the hill country of the Tribe of Judah, 5 km west northwest of Hebron. Some experts, but not all, identify it with the archaeological site standing not far from the modern Palestinian village.

=== Archaeology ===
Archaeological finds in the vicinity of the hill site include remains of an ancient road, a well to the west, cisterns, and rock-cuttings. The PEF's Survey of Western Palestine (SWP) noted: "Evidently an ancient site; there are caves here, with trenches leading down to them, as at Khurbet 'Aziz, and the rock is quarried. An ancient road leads past the village."

=== Ottoman period ===
In the Ottoman census of the 1500s, Taffuh was located in the nahiya of Halil. While Taffuh was included in lists from the early part of the 16th century, there is no evidence of settlement in the second half of the 16th century. However, it was resettled at a later period.

In 1838, Edward Robinson noted Teffuh as a Muslim village, located north of el-Khulil, and west of the road from Jerusalem. Robinson further described it as "an old village [..] it contains a good number of inhabitants, and lies in the midst of olive groves and vineyards, with marks of industry and thrift on every side. Indeed many of the former terraces along the hill sides are still in use [..] Several portions of walls, apparently those of an old fortress, are visible among the houses..."

In 1863, Victor Guérin visited and found the village to have 400 inhabitants. He also noted that several houses seemed ancient. An Ottoman village list of about 1870 counted 54 houses and a population of 161, though the population count included men.

In 1883, the PEF's Survey of Western Palestine (SWP) described Taffuh as "A village of ancient appearance, standing high at the edge of a ridge; on the north are the steep slopes of Wady Kedir, in which are olives belonging to the place. An ancient main-road passes through the village, and runs along flat ground to the west for a little way, then descends the ridge. There is a well to the west, with cisterns, caves, and rock-cuttings. The village has vineyards round it, and good springs in the valley to the west."

=== British Mandate ===
In the 1922 census of Palestine conducted by the British Mandate authorities, Taffuh had a population of 461 inhabitants, all Muslims, increasing in the 1931 census to 580, all Muslim, in 124 inhabited houses.

In the 1945 statistics the population of Taffuh was 780, all Muslims, who owned 12,103 dunams of land according to an official land and population survey. 1,073 dunams were plantations and irrigable land, 3,543 for cereals, while 31 dunams were built-up (urban) land.

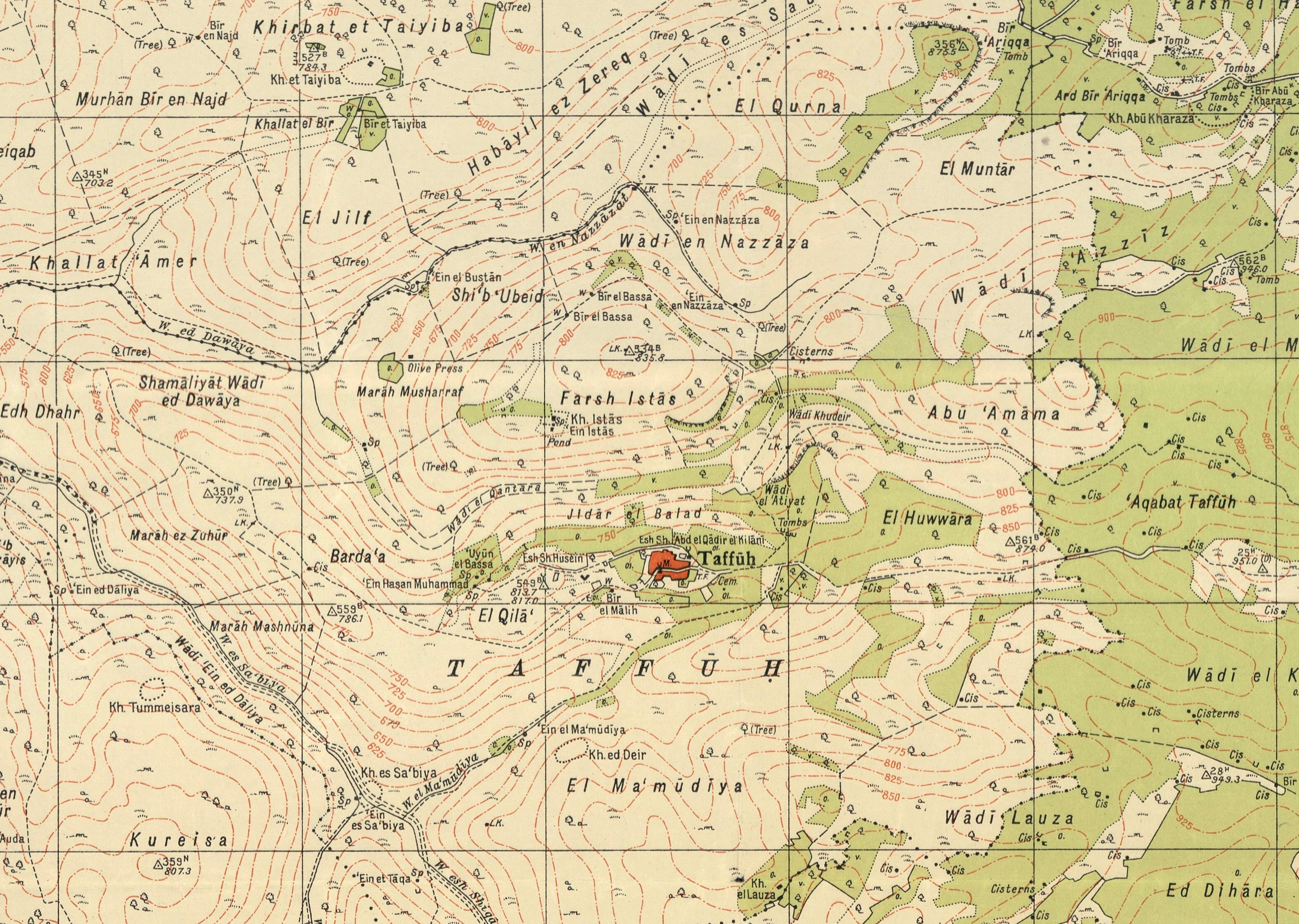
Taffuh, British Mandate map, 1:20,000

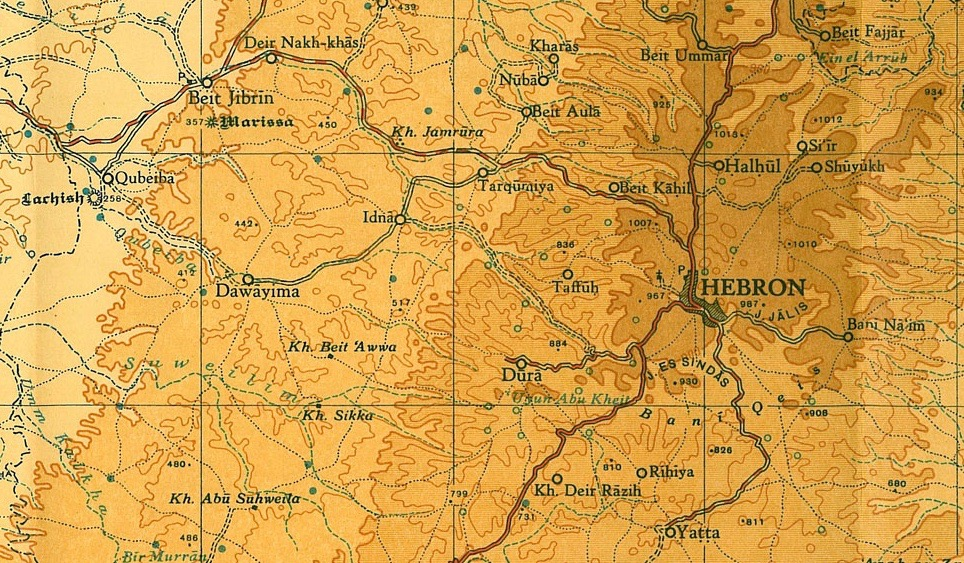
Taffuh on 1945 1:250,000 map

=== 1948-1967 ===
In the wake of the 1948 Arab–Israeli War, and after the 1949 Armistice Agreements, Taffuh came under Jordanian rule.

The Jordanian census of 1961 found 1,282 inhabitants in Taffuh.

=== 1967-present ===
Since the Six-Day War in 1967, Taffuh has been under Israeli occupation.

== Demography ==
According to the geographer David Grossman, Taffuh was possibly settled by refugees from Bayt Jibrin (or nearby Jamrura) as a result of local conflicts. It had lands near Jamrura-Sanbira, but those were later sold. Ben-Zvi noted that the inhabitants were said to have Christian origins.

== Bibliography ==
- Bagatti, B. (2002). Ancient Christian villages of Judaea and the Negev. Franciscan Printing Press. ISBN 9789655160468.
- Barron, J.B., ed. (1923). Palestine: Report and General Abstracts of the Census of 1922. Government of Palestine.
- Conder, C.R.; Kitchener, H.H. (1883). The Survey of Western Palestine: Memoirs of the Topography, Orography, Hydrography, and Archaeology. Vol. 3. London: Committee of the Palestine Exploration Fund.
- Government of Jordan, Department of Statistics (1964). First Census of Population and Housing. Volume I: Final Tables; General Characteristics of the Population (PDF).
- Government of Palestine, Department of Statistics (1945). Village Statistics, April, 1945.
- Guérin, V. (1869). Description Géographique Historique et Archéologique de la Palestine (in French). Vol. 1: Judee, pt. 3. Paris: L'Imprimerie Nationale.
- Hadawi, S. (1970). Village Statistics of 1945: A Classification of Land and Area ownership in Palestine. Palestine Liberation Organization Research Center.
- Hartmann, M. (1883). "Die Ortschaftenliste des Liwa Jerusalem in dem türkischen Staatskalender für Syrien auf das Jahr 1288 der Flucht (1871)". Zeitschrift des Deutschen Palästina-Vereins. 6: 102–149.
- Mills, E., ed. (1932). Census of Palestine 1931. Population of Villages, Towns and Administrative Areas. Jerusalem: Government of Palestine.
- Palmer, E.H. (1881). The Survey of Western Palestine: Arabic and English Name Lists Collected During the Survey by Lieutenants Conder and Kitchener, R. E. Transliterated and Explained by E.H. Palmer. Committee of the Palestine Exploration Fund.
- Pringle, D. (1993). The Churches of the Crusader Kingdom of Jerusalem: A-K (excluding Acre and Jerusalem). Vol. I. Cambridge University Press. ISBN 0-521-39036-2. (pp. 29-30)
- Robinson, E.; Smith, E. (1841). Biblical Researches in Palestine, Mount Sinai and Arabia Petraea: A Journal of Travels in the year 1838. Vol. 2. Boston: Crocker & Brewster.
- Robinson, E.; Smith, E. (1841). Biblical Researches in Palestine, Mount Sinai and Arabia Petraea: A Journal of Travels in the year 1838. Vol. 3. Boston: Crocker & Brewster.
- Socin, A. (1879). "Alphabetisches Verzeichniss von Ortschaften des Paschalik Jerusalem". Zeitschrift des Deutschen Palästina-Vereins. 2: 135–163.
- Toledano, E. (1984). "The Sanjaq of Jerusalem in the Sixteenth Century: Aspects of Topography and Population". Archivum Ottomanicum. 9: 279–319. Archived from the original on 2016-03-05.
- Wilkinson, John; Hill, Joyce; Ryan, William Francis (1988). Jerusalem pilgrimage, 1099-1185. Hakluyt Society. ISBN 9780904180213.
- Woudstra, M. (1981). The book of Joshua. Grand Rapids: Wm. B. Eerdmans Publishing Co. ISBN 9780802825254.
