= Karma, Hebron =

Village in West Bank, Palestine

Karma
- Municipality type D (Village council)

Arabic transcription(s)
  - Arabic: كرمة
- Location of Karma within Palestine
- Coordinates: 31°27′03″N 35°01′39″E
- State: Palestine
- Governorate: Hebron

Government
  - Type: Village council

Population (2017)
  - Total: 1,781
- Name meaning: The ruin of the vineyard

Karma (Arabic: كرمة) is a village located nineteen kilometers south-west of Hebron, Palestine. The village is in the Hebron Governorate Southern West Bank. The village had a population of 1,781 in 2017.

== History ==
In 1883 the PEF's Survey of Western Palestine (SWP) found here "traces of ruins".

According to the Palestinian Central Bureau of Statistics, the village had a population of 1,386 in 2007. The primary health care facilities for the village are at Qila designated by the Ministry of Health as level 1.

== Bibliography ==
- Conder, C.R.; Kitchener, H.H. (1883). The Survey of Western Palestine: Memoirs of the Topography, Orography, Hydrography, and Archaeology. Vol. 3. London: Committee of the Palestine Exploration Fund.
- Palmer, E.H. (1881). The Survey of Western Palestine: Arabic and English Name Lists Collected During the Survey by Lieutenants Conder and Kitchener, R. E. Transliterated and Explained by E.H. Palmer. Committee of the Palestine Exploration Fund.
