= Deir al-'Asal al-Fauqa =

Village in West Bank, Palestine

- Municipality type D (Village council)

Arabic transcription(s)
  - Arabic: دير العسل الفوقا
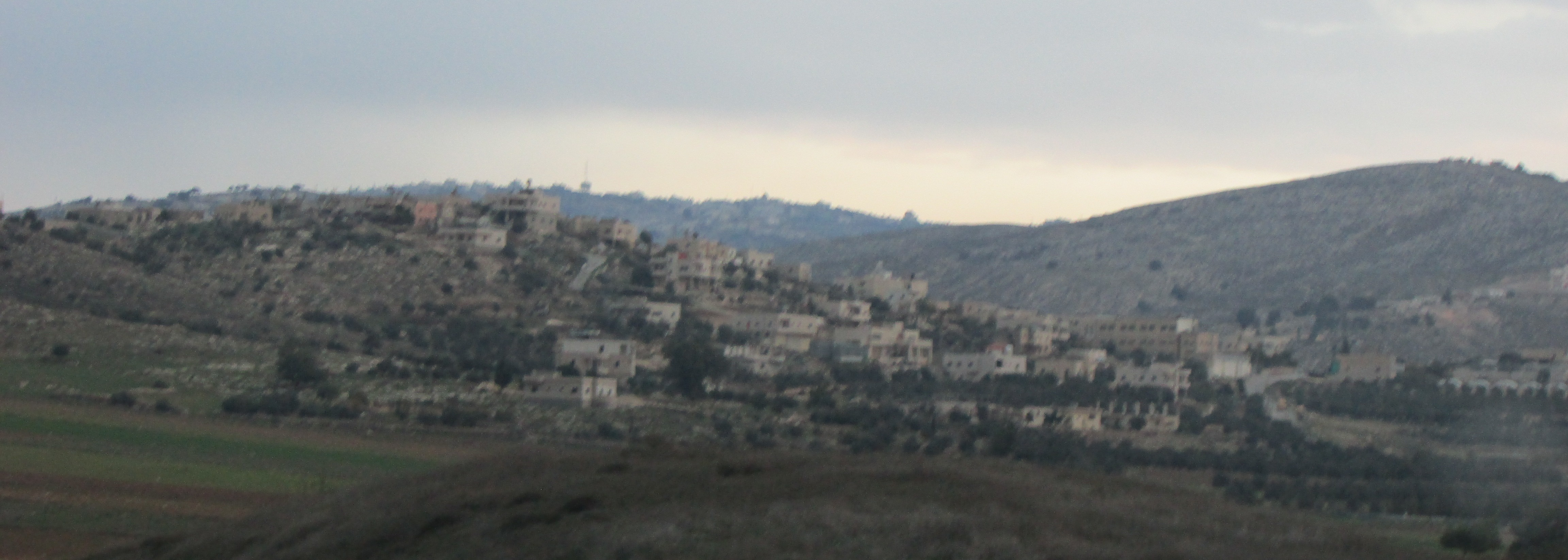
- Deir al-'Asal al-Fauqa

- Location of Deir al-'Asal al-Fauqa within Palestine
- Coordinates: 31°28′07″N 34°56′17″E
- Palestine grid: 144/097
- State: State of Palestine
- Governorate: Hebron

Government
  - Type: Village council

Population (2017)
  - Total: 1,859

Deir al-'Asal al-Fauqa (Arabic: دير العسل الفوقا) is a Palestinian town located sixteen kilometers west of Hebron.The town is in the Hebron Governorate Southern West Bank. According to the Palestinian Central Bureau of Statistics, the town had a population of 1,859 in 2017.

== Etymology ==
According to Palmer, the name Deir el ’Asl means "the monastery of honey".

== History ==
Ceramics from the Byzantine era have been found here.

=== Ottoman era ===
In 1838, a Deir el-'Asl was noted as a place "in ruins or deserted," part of the area between the mountains and Gaza, but subject to the government of el-Khulil.

In 1863 Victor Guérin noted "considerable ruins" at Khirbet Deir el-A'sal. There were ruined houses at each step he walked, and he found cisterns, silos and underground stores, dug into the rock, "probably dating back to ancient times".

In 1883, the PEF's Survey of Palestine found here "foundations, and heaps of stones, caves, cisterns, and a ruined chapel, apparently Byzantine."

=== British Mandate era ===
At the time of the 1931 census of Palestine the population of the village, called Kh. Der el Asal el Gharbiya, was counted under Dura.

=== Jordanian era ===
In the wake of the 1948 Arab–Israeli War, and after the 1949 Armistice Agreements, Deir al-'Asal al-Fauqa came under Jordanian rule.

In 1961, the population of Deir al-'Asal al-Fauqa was 282.

=== 1967, aftermath ===
After the Six-Day War, Deir al-'Asal al-Fauqa has been under Israeli occupation.

In March 2013, Yusef a-Shawamreh, a 14-year-old from the village, who went with two others through the Israeli West Bank barrier near the village to pick Akub on part of his family's land west of the barrier, was shot to death by Israeli soldiers, stationed to prevent unauthorized passage through the barrier. According to an IDF investigation, a-Shawamreh and his partners made a hole in the fence before passing. After passing through the fence the soldiers called them to stop. When they tried to escape, the soldiers shot towards a-Shawamreh's leg but mistakenly hit his waist, causing his death. Therefore, the soldiers were not prosecuted. B'Tselem criticized this decision, claiming that a-Shawamreh was shot without warning, and that, in any event, the decision to put soldiers in ambush near the fence and shoot those who pass was illegal.

== Bibliography ==
- Conder, C.R.; Kitchener, H.H. (1883). The Survey of Western Palestine: Memoirs of the Topography, Orography, Hydrography, and Archaeology. Vol. 3. London: Committee of the Palestine Exploration Fund.
- Dauphin, C. (1998). La Palestine byzantine, Peuplement et Populations. BAR International Series 726 (in French). Vol. III : Catalogue. Oxford: Archeopress. ISBN 0-860549-05-4.
- Government of Jordan, Department of Statistics (1964). First Census of Population and Housing. Volume I: Final Tables; General Characteristics of the Population (PDF).
- Guérin, V. (1869). Description Géographique Historique et Archéologique de la Palestine (in French). Vol. 1: Judee, pt. 2. Paris: L'Imprimerie Nationale.
- Mills, E., ed. (1932). Census of Palestine 1931. Population of Villages, Towns and Administrative Areas. Jerusalem: Government of Palestine.
- Palmer, E.H. (1881). The Survey of Western Palestine: Arabic and English Name Lists Collected During the Survey by Lieutenants Conder and Kitchener, R. E. Transliterated and Explained by E.H. Palmer. Committee of the Palestine Exploration Fund.
- Robinson, E.; Smith, E. (1841). Biblical Researches in Palestine, Mount Sinai and Arabia Petraea: A Journal of Travels in the year 1838. Vol. 3. Boston: Crocker & Brewster.
- Tsafrir, Y.; Leah Di Segni; Judith Green (1994). (TIR): Tabula Imperii Romani: Judaea, Palaestina. Jerusalem: Israel Academy of Sciences and Humanities. ISBN 965-208-107-8. (p. 110)
