= Hureiz =

Village in West Bank, Palestine

- Municipality type D (Village council)

Arabic transcription(s)
  - Arabic: حريز
- Location of Hureiz within Palestine
- Coordinates: 31°28′9″N 35°7′28″E
- Palestine grid: 163/098
- State: State of Palestine
- Governorate: Hebron

Government
  - Type: Village council

Population (2006)
  - Total: 997

Hureiz (Arabic: حريز) is a Palestinian village located seven kilometers south-east of Hebron. The village is in the Hebron Governorate Southern West Bank. According to the Palestinian Central Bureau of Statistics, the village had a population of 997 in mid-year 2006. The primary health care facilities for the village are at Zif designated by the Ministry of Health as level 1 and at Yatta, level 3.
