= Hamze Awawde =

Palestinian activist

- حمزة عواودة
- Born: 1970 (age 55–56); Dura, Hebron
- Education: Birzeit University; Hebrew University of Jerusalem
- Occupation: Peace activist
- Organizations: Hands of Peace; Americans for Peace Now; Peres Center for Peace

Hamze Awawde (Arabic: حمزة عواودة; born 1990) is a Palestinian peace activist.

== Early life and education ==
Awawde grew up in the West Bank city of Dura. His family is a prominent one in the Hebron area; his grandfather was a Fatah official. During the Second Intifada, part of Awawde's home was destroyed by IDF soldiers, who thought a terrorist was hiding in the building.

Awawde earned a bachelor's degree in business from Birzeit University, and a master's degree in global community development from the Hebrew University of Jerusalem.

== Activism ==
In 2011, Awawde joined the Facebook group YaLa Young Leaders, a project organized by the Peres Center for Peace, which was meant to be a space for Israelis and Palestinians to connect on an individual basis. Awawde remained with the group as they expanded, and later became a part of their leadership and organized some programs for them.

In 2014, through a program called New Story Leadership, Awawde traveled to the United States, where he lived in Washington D.C. with an Israeli program participant. At the time, he was an intern at Americans for Peace Now. Awawde and his housemate developed a close friendship that the two aimed to continue when they returned home.

Awade works for Hands of Peace as Regional Manager of the Palestinian Delegation.

In November 2023, Awawde co-organized Building Bridges, Together for Humanity, a joint Israeli-Palestinian anti-hate event in London.

== Personal life ==
As of 2023, Awawde lives in Ramallah. He is Muslim.
