= Deir Razih =

Village in West Bank, Palestine

- Local Development Committee

Arabic transcription(s)
  - Arabic: دير رازح
  - Latin: Khirbet Deir Razih (official); Dayr Razih (unofficial)
- Location of Deir Razih within Palestine
- Coordinates: 31°28′00″N 35°02′30″E
- Palestine grid: 154/096
- State: State of Palestine
- Governorate: Hebron

Government
  - Type: Local Development Committee

Area
  - Total: 0.5 km^{2} (0.19 sq mi)

Population (2017)
  - Total: 294
  - Density: 590/km^{2} (1,500/sq mi)
- Name meaning: "the ruin of the monastery of the man of Rai"

Deir Razih (Arabic: دير رازح) is a Palestinian village in the southern West Bank located 11 kilometers (6.8 mi) southwest of Hebron, in the Hebron Governorate. It relies mainly on nearby Dura for basic services. Its total land area is made of 540 dunams, including its built-up area. The village had a population of 294 residents in 2017.

== History ==
Ceramics from the Byzantine era have been found here.

=== Ottoman era ===
French explorer Victor Guérin visited the place in 1863, during the late Ottoman era. He described it as a ruin, with one structure larger than the rest above an underground magazine.

In 1883, the PEF's Survey of Western Palestine found "walls, cisterns and caves. Rock-cut tombs to the east" of the village.

=== British Mandate era ===
At the time of the 1931 census of Palestine, conducted by the British Mandate authorities, the population of Kh. Dair Razih was counted under Dura.

=== Jordanian era ===
In the wake of the 1948 Arab–Israeli War, and after the 1949 Armistice Agreements, Kh. Dair Razih came under Jordanian rule.

The Jordanian census of 1961 found 130 inhabitants in Deir Razih.

=== Post 1967 ===
After the Six-Day War in 1967, Deir Razih has been under Israeli occupation.

In the summer of 2007, a group of Israeli settlers from Otniel accompanied by soldiers and a bulldozers entered village lands and uprooted 150 olive, almond and pine trees. Having done this they, also, set fire to the land causing damage to crops and pastures. Fire brigades from the Palestinian municipalities of Dura and as-Samu' extinguish the fires soon after.

In the 1997 census by the Palestinian Central Bureau of Statistics (PCBS), the village had a total population of 236, of which 11.9% were Palestinian refugees. By mid-year 2006, there were 328 inhabitants. However, the PCBS census of 2007 revealed that the population was 268. Deir Razih is inhabited by the extended families of Amru, Abu Arqub, Hija, and the al-Azazmeh Bedouins. Most residents depend on agriculture as main income.

== Bibliography ==
- Conder, C.R.; Kitchener, H.H. (1883). The Survey of Western Palestine: Memoirs of the Topography, Orography, Hydrography, and Archaeology. Vol. 3. London: Committee of the Palestine Exploration Fund.
- Dauphin, C. (1998). La Palestine byzantine, Peuplement et Populations. BAR International Series 726 (in French). Vol. III : Catalogue. Oxford: Archeopress. ISBN 0-860549-05-4.
- Government of Jordan, Department of Statistics (1964). First Census of Population and Housing. Volume I: Final Tables; General Characteristics of the Population (PDF).
- Guérin, V. (1869). Description Géographique Historique et Archéologique de la Palestine (in French). Vol. 1: Judee, pt. 3. Paris: L'Imprimerie Nationale.
- Mills, E., ed. (1932). Census of Palestine 1931. Population of Villages, Towns and Administrative Areas. Jerusalem: Government of Palestine.
- Palmer, E.H. (1881). The Survey of Western Palestine: Arabic and English Name Lists Collected During the Survey by Lieutenants Conder and Kitchener, R. E. Transliterated and Explained by E.H. Palmer. Committee of the Palestine Exploration Fund.
