= Beit ar-Rush al-Fauqa =

- Municipality type D (Village council)

Arabic transcription(s)
  - Arabic: بيت الروش الفوقا
- Location of Beit ar-Rush al-Fauqa within Palestine
- Coordinates: 31°27′07″N 34°55′34″E
- Palestine grid: 144/095
- State: State of Palestine
- Governorate: Hebron

Government
  - Type: Village council

Population (2017)
  - Total: 1,385
- Name meaning: The house of er Rush; personal name

Beit ar-Rush al-Fauqa (Arabic: بيت الروش الفوقا) is a Palestinian village located eighteen kilometers southwest of Hebron.The village is in the Hebron Governorate Southern West Bank. According to the Palestinian Central Bureau of Statistics, the village had a population of 1,385 in 2017.

== History ==
Al-Dimashqi (d.1327) noted one area called Bait-ras in Palestine, and A. F. Mehren thought its description matched the location of the Beit er-Rush of Robinson.

=== Ottoman era ===
In 1838, a Beit er-Rush was noted by Edward Robinson as a place "in ruins or deserted," part of the area between the mountains and Gaza, but subject to the government of el-Khulil.

In 1863, Victor Guérin noted about the place he called Khirbet Beit-Rouch: ”These ruins consist of a large number of heaps of irregular materials. Each of these heaps surrounds a cave hollowed in the rock, into which there is a descent of steps, or by an incline. These subterranean dwellings formed the basement of one-storied houses which stood above them. These have been pulled down and put up again several times, while the cellars are just the same as when they were cut in the rock."

In 1883, the PEF's Survey of Western Palestine noted here: ”Traces of ruins on a mound.”

=== British Mandate era ===
At the time of the 1931 census of Palestine the population of the village, called Kh. Beit er Rush al Ulya, was counted under Dura.

=== Jordanian era ===
In the wake of the 1948 Arab–Israeli War, and after the 1949 Armistice Agreements, Beit ar-Rush al-Fauqa came under Jordanian rule. It was annexed by Jordan in 1950.

The Jordanian census of 1961 found 162 inhabitants in Beit ar-Rush al-Fauqa.

=== Post 1967 ===
Since the Six-Day War in 1967, Beit ar-Rush al-Fauqa has been under Israeli occupation.

== Bibliography ==
- Al-Dimashqi (1874). Manuel de la cosmographie du moyen āge (in French). Translated by A. F. Mehren. C. A. Reitzel.
- Conder, C.R.; Kitchener, H.H. (1883). The Survey of Western Palestine: Memoirs of the Topography, Orography, Hydrography, and Archaeology. Vol. 3. London: Committee of the Palestine Exploration Fund.
- Government of Jordan, Department of Statistics (1964). First Census of Population and Housing. Volume I: Final Tables; General Characteristics of the Population (PDF).
- Guérin, V. (1869). Description Géographique Historique et Archéologique de la Palestine (in French). Vol. 1: Judee, pt. 2. Paris: L'Imprimerie Nationale.
- Mills, E., ed. (1932). Census of Palestine 1931. Population of Villages, Towns and Administrative Areas. Jerusalem: Government of Palestine.
- Palmer, E.H. (1881). The Survey of Western Palestine: Arabic and English Name Lists Collected During the Survey by Lieutenants Conder and Kitchener, R. E. Transliterated and Explained by E.H. Palmer. Committee of the Palestine Exploration Fund.
- Robinson, E.; Smith, E. (1841). Biblical Researches in Palestine, Mount Sinai and Arabia Petraea: A Journal of Travels in the year 1838. Vol. 3. Boston: Crocker & Brewster.
