= As-Sura =

Village in West Bank, Palestine

as-Sura
- Municipality type D (Village council)

Arabic transcription(s)
- Location of as-Sura within Palestine
- Coordinates: 31°28′16″N 35°0′4″E
- State: State of Palestine
- Governorate: Hebron

Government
  - Type: Village council

Population (2017)
  - Total: 3,941

as-Sura is a Palestinian village located fifteen kilometers south-west of Hebron. The village is in the Hebron Governorate Southern West Bank. According to the Palestinian Central Bureau of Statistics, the village had a population of 3,941 in 2017. The primary health care facilities for the village are obtained at Imreish where they are designated by the Ministry of Health as level 1.
