= Al-Majd, Hebron =

Village in West Bank, Palestine

al-Majd
- Municipality type D (Village council)

Arabic transcription(s)
  - Arabic: خربة المجد
- Location of al-Majd within Palestine
- Coordinates: 31°28′50″N 34°57′01″E
- Palestine grid: 145/098
- State: State of Palestine
- Governorate: Hebron

Government
  - Type: Village council

Population (2017)
  - Total: 2,277
- Name meaning: Glory

Al-Majd (Arabic: خربة المجد) is a Palestinian village located eighteen kilometers south-west of Hebron. The village is in the Hebron Governorate of Palestine, in the southern West Bank. The village had a population of 2,277 in 2017.

== History ==
Ceramics from the Byzantine era have been found here.

=== Ottoman era ===
In 1863, Victor Guérin called it Khirbet Medjed.

In 1883 the PEF's Survey of Palestine found here "Caves, cisterns, and pillar shafts; a ruined chapel seems to have stood there".

=== 1948-1967 ===
In the wake of the 1948 Arab–Israeli War, and after the 1949 Armistice Agreements, Al-Majd came under Jordanian rule.

The Jordanian census of 1961 found 466 inhabitants in Al-Majd.

=== 1967-present ===
After the Six-Day War in 1967, Al-Majd has been under Israeli occupation.

According to the Palestinian Central Bureau of Statistics, the village had a population of 1,925 in 2007.

== Bibliography ==
- Conder, C.R.; Kitchener, H.H. (1883). The Survey of Western Palestine: Memoirs of the Topography, Orography, Hydrography, and Archaeology. Vol. 3. London: Committee of the Palestine Exploration Fund.
- Dauphin, C. (1998). La Palestine byzantine, Peuplement et Populations. BAR International Series 726 (in French). Vol. III : Catalogue. Oxford: Archeopress. ISBN 0-860549-05-4.
- Government of Jordan, Department of Statistics (1964). First Census of Population and Housing. Volume I: Final Tables; General Characteristics of the Population (PDF).
- Guérin, V. (1869). Description Géographique Historique et Archéologique de la Palestine (in French). Vol. 1: Judee, pt. 2. Paris: L'Imprimerie Nationale.
- Palmer, E.H. (1881). The Survey of Western Palestine: Arabic and English Name Lists Collected During the Survey by Lieutenants Conder and Kitchener, R. E. Transliterated and Explained by E.H. Palmer. Committee of the Palestine Exploration Fund.
