= Imreish =

Village in West Bank, Palestine

- Municipality type D (Village council)

Arabic transcription(s)
  - Arabic: امريش
- Location of Imreish within Palestine
- Coordinates: 31°28′6″N 35°0′46″E
- State: State of Palestine
- Governorate: Hebron

Government
  - Type: Village council

Population (2017)
  - Total: 2,208

Imreish (Arabic: امريش) is a Palestinian village located eleven kilometers south-west of Hebron. The village is in the Hebron Governorate in the southern West Bank. According to the Palestinian Central Bureau of Statistics, the village had a population of 2,208 in 2017. The primary health care facilities for the village are designated by the Ministry of Health as level 1.
