= Dura, Hebron =

City in West Bank, Palestine

Dura دورا
- Municipality type A (City)

Arabic transcription(s)
  - Arabic: دورا
  - Latin: Durrah (official)
- General view of the city of Dura

- Municipal seal of Dura

- Location of Dura within Palestine
- Coordinates: 31°30′25″N 35°01′40″E
- Palestine grid: 152/101
- State: Palestine
- Governorate: Hebron

Government
  - Type: City (from 1967)
  - Head of Municipality: Mr. Ahmad Salhoub

Population (2017)
  - Total: 39,336
- Name meaning: Dura (proper noun) from Hebrew אֲדוֹרַים Adoraim

Dura (Arabic: دورا) is a Palestinian city located eleven kilometers southwest of Hebron, in the southern West Bank, in the Hebron Governorate of the State of Palestine. According to the Palestinian Central Bureau of Statistics, the town had a population of 39,336 in 2017. The current mayor is Ahmad Salhoub.

In 1517, Dura was incorporated into the Ottoman Empire with the rest of Syria. In the late Ottoman and early Mandatory periods, Dura was the only permanent settlement in the southeastern ridge of the central highlands. Starting as a village and evolving into a town, it sprawled across large territories, becoming a center for influential families, collectively referred to as Abu-Darham.

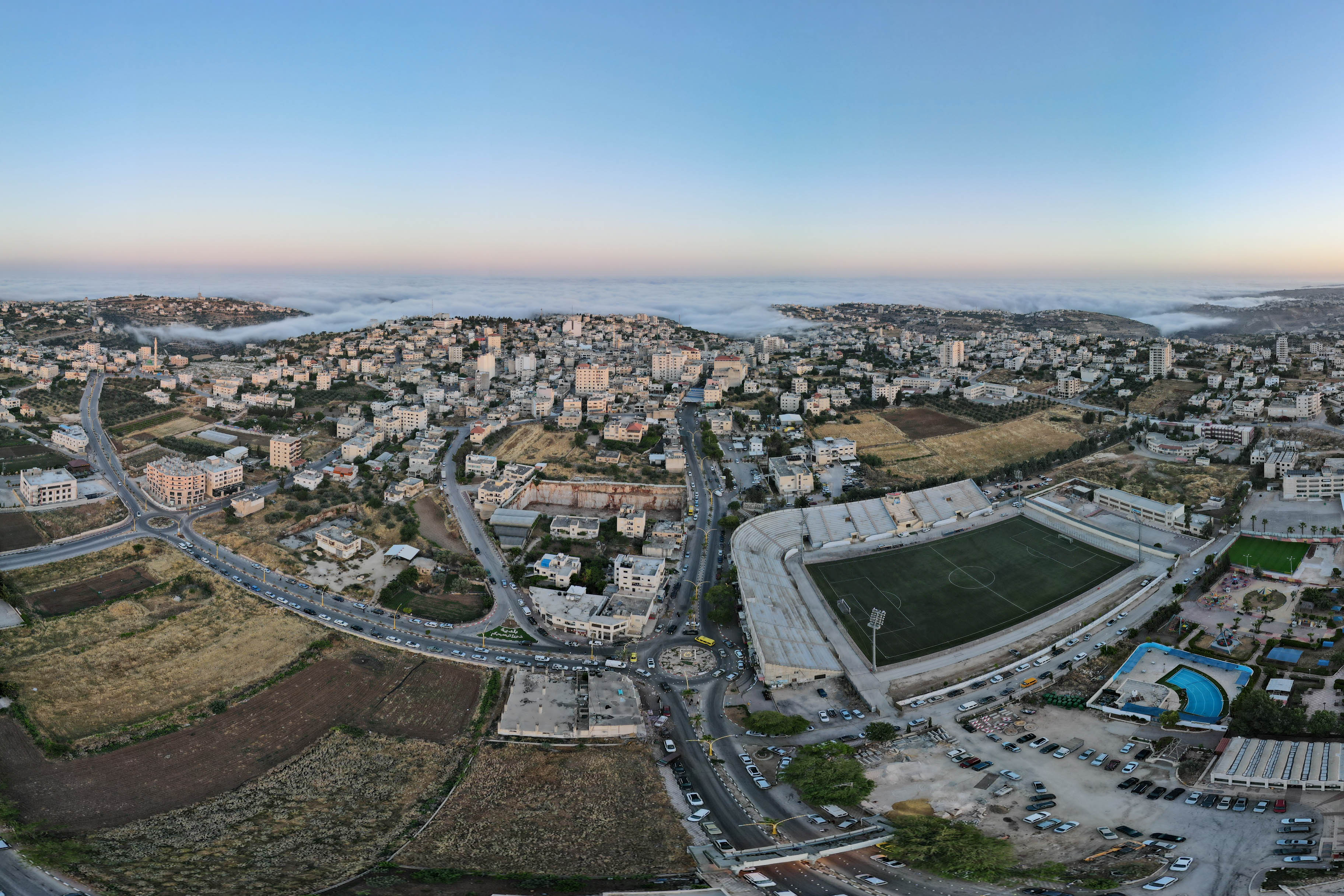
Dura city centre

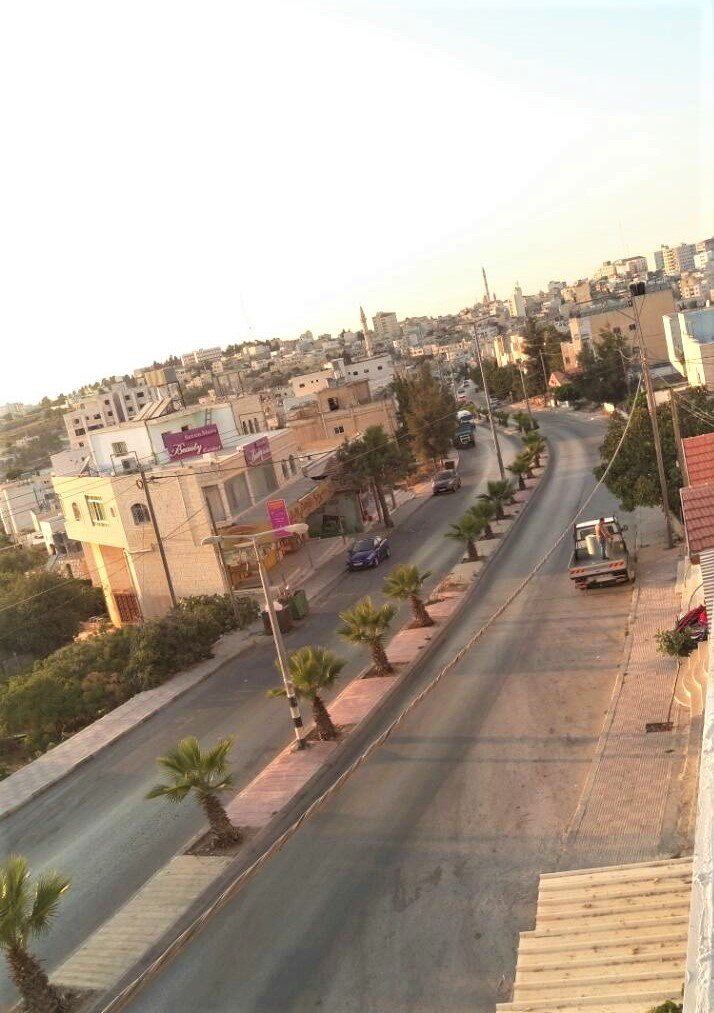
Hnenh Street

After the British Mandate, in the wake of the 1948 Arab–Israeli War, Dura came under Jordanian rule. Dura was established as a municipality on January 1, 1967, five months before it came under Israeli occupation after the Six-Day War. Since 1995, it has been governed by the Palestinian National Authority, as part of Area A of the West Bank and as part of the Hebron Governorate of the State of Palestine.

== Etymology ==
The present-day name of Dura has been identified with ancient Adoraim or the Adora of 1 Macc.13.20 The village was originally built on two hills: Dura al-‘Amaira and Dura al-Arjan possibly reflecting dual grammatical number of Adoraim name, which could also be a double village during antiquity.

== History ==
=== Archaeology ===
Ancient cisterns and fragments of mosaics have been found at Dura.

The settlement was mentioned in the Amarna letters as early as 14th century BC. and in the Papyrus Anastasi I.

A 1st-century CE mansion, inhabited until the First Jewish–Roman War (66–73 CE), was partially excavated near Dura, at Khirbet Moraq. The city retained its Jewish character until at least the end of the Bar Kokhba revolt (135 CE).

=== Early Muslim period ===
Mukaddasi, writing around 985 CE, noted that Palestine was famous for its vineyards and a type of raisin called Dūrī, said to be from Dura.

=== Ottoman period ===
In 1517, the village was incorporated into the Ottoman Empire with the rest of Palestine. In 1596 it appeared in the tax registers as being in the Nahiya of Khalil of the Liwa of Quds. It had a population of 49 Muslim households. The villagers paid a fixed tax rate of 33,3% on agricultural products, including on wheat, barley, olives, vines or fruit trees, and goats or beehives; a total of 10,000 akçe.

According to a study by William F. Albright, Bedouins overran Dura in the 17th century. As a result, new families became the dominant ones, replacing its previous population. Residents of several villages in the Ramallah Governorate such as At-Tira, Beit 'Anan, Beit Ur al-Fauqa, and Dura al-Qar', trace their ancestry to Dura.

During the late Ottoman and early Mandatory periods, Dura stood as the sole permanent settlement in the southeastern ridge of the central highlands. Beginning as a village and evolving into a town, it expanded across extensive territories, becoming a battleground for influential families, collectively known as Abu-Darham, particularly the al-'Amr, Namura, Dudeen, and Hajji hamulas. These families, associated with the 'Amr and 'Arjan quarters, frequently quarreled for dominance. Some Abu-Darham families claimed non-native ancestry, having integrated into the village during the 18th century. Establishing alliances with Bedouin tribes proved advantageous. 'Abd al-Rahman al-'Amr, a prominent ruler, sought refuge among the Bedouin Tiaha tribe following his escape from a prison in Jerusalem after he revolted in the 1850s. This connection helped deter Bedouin incursions and facilitated peaceful territorial expansions for Dura.

In 1834, Dura's inhabitants participated in an uprising against the Egyptian Ibrahim Pasha, who took over the area between 1831 and 1840. When Robinson visited in 1838, he described Dura as one of the largest villages in the area, and the residence of the sheikhs of Ibn Omar, who had formerly ruled the area.

In 1863 the French explorer Victor Guérin visited the place, and noted that "Fragments of ancient columns, and a good number of cut stones taken from old constructions and built up in the Arab houses, show the antiquity of the place. Two barracks especially have been built in this way. Above the door of one, a block forming the lintel was once ornamented with mouldings, now very much mutilated. Close to the town is a celebrated wely in which lies a colossal sarcophagus, containing, it is said, the body of Noah."

An Ottoman village list from about 1870 found that Dura had a population of 420, in 144 houses, though the population count included men, only. In 1877 Lieutenant Kitchener had some boys publicly flogged in Dura following an incident when stones were thrown at a member of the Palestine Exploration Fund survey party.

In 1883, the PEF's Survey of Western Palestine described Dura as "A large and nourishing village on the flat slope of a hill, with open ground on the east for about a mile. This plain is cultivated with corn. To the north of Dura are a few olives, and others on the south. The houses are of stone. South of the village are two Mukams with white domes; and on the west, higher than the village, is the tomb of Neby Nuh (Prophet Noah). Near these there are rock-cut sepulchres. The place is well supplied from three springs on the east and one on the south."

=== British Mandate ===
In 1921, a violent conflict took place between Dura and the nearby town of Ad-Dhahiriya. It was resolved through the imposition of a hefty fine of 20,000 Egyptian pounds on the "brigands" of Dura.

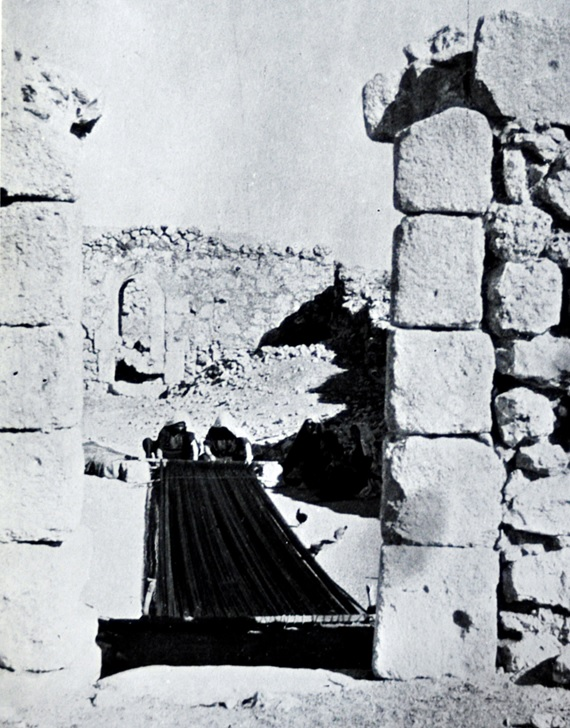
Women weaving carpet on a ground loom in Dura, 1930s

In the 1922 census of Palestine, conducted by the British Mandate authorities, Dura was divided into Dura al-‘Amaira, with 2,565 inhabitants, and Dura al-Arjan, with 3,269 inhabitants; a total of 5,834, all Muslims. The report of the 1931 census wrote that "the village in the Hebron sub-district commonly known as Dura is a congeries of neighbouring localities each of which has a distinctive name; and, while Dura is a remarkable example of neighbourly agglutination, the phenomenon is not infrequent in other villages". The total of 70 locations listed in the report had 1538 inhabited houses and a population of 7255 Muslims.

In the 1945 statistics the population of Dura was 9,700, all Muslims, who owned 240,704 dunams of land according to an official land and population survey. 3,917 dunams were plantations and irrigable land, 90,637 for cereals, while 226 dunams were built-up (urban) land. Dura village lands covered in this period an estimated 240 square kilometres (93 sq mi), which included 99 ruined settlement sites.

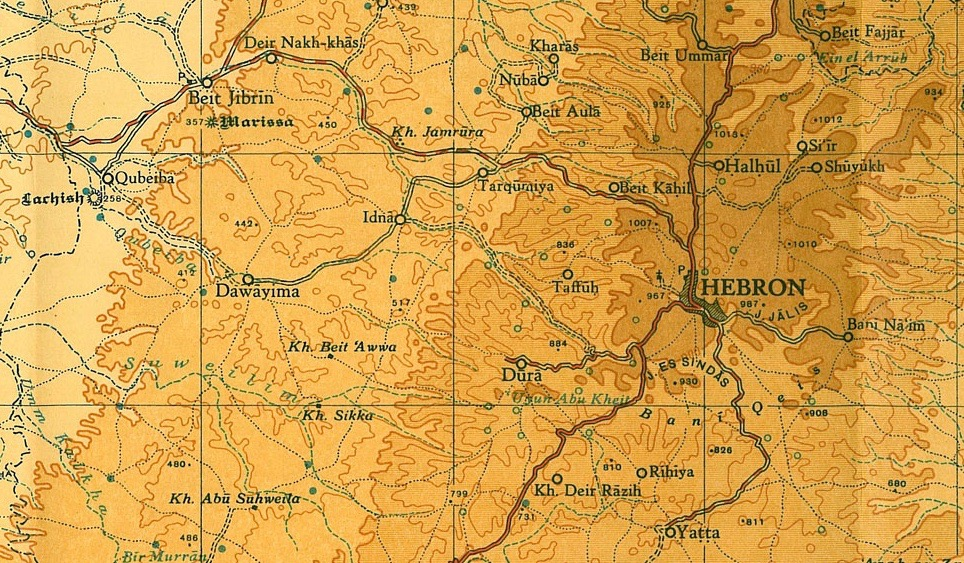
Dura 1945 1:250,000

The Palestinian Rural History Project recorded the following dependencies associated with Dura, including al-Burj, al-Kom, Deir Razih, Deir Sammit, Ifqeiqis, Marah al-Baqqar, Murran and Umm al-Shuqaf. Additional sites include:

- Beit Awwa
- As Simiya
- Imreish
- Beit ar-Rush al-Fauqa
- Al-Majd
- Deir al-'Asal al-Fauqa
- al-Burj

=== Jordanian rule ===
In the wake of the 1948 Arab–Israeli War, and after the 1949 Armistice Agreements, Dura came under Jordanian rule.

In 1961, the population of Dura was 3,852.

=== Post-1967 ===
Since the Six-Day War in 1967, Dura has been under Israeli occupation. The population in the 1967 census conducted by the Israeli authorities was 4,954.

The municipality of Dura was established on January 1, 1967, five months before it was occupied by Israel during the Six-Day War.

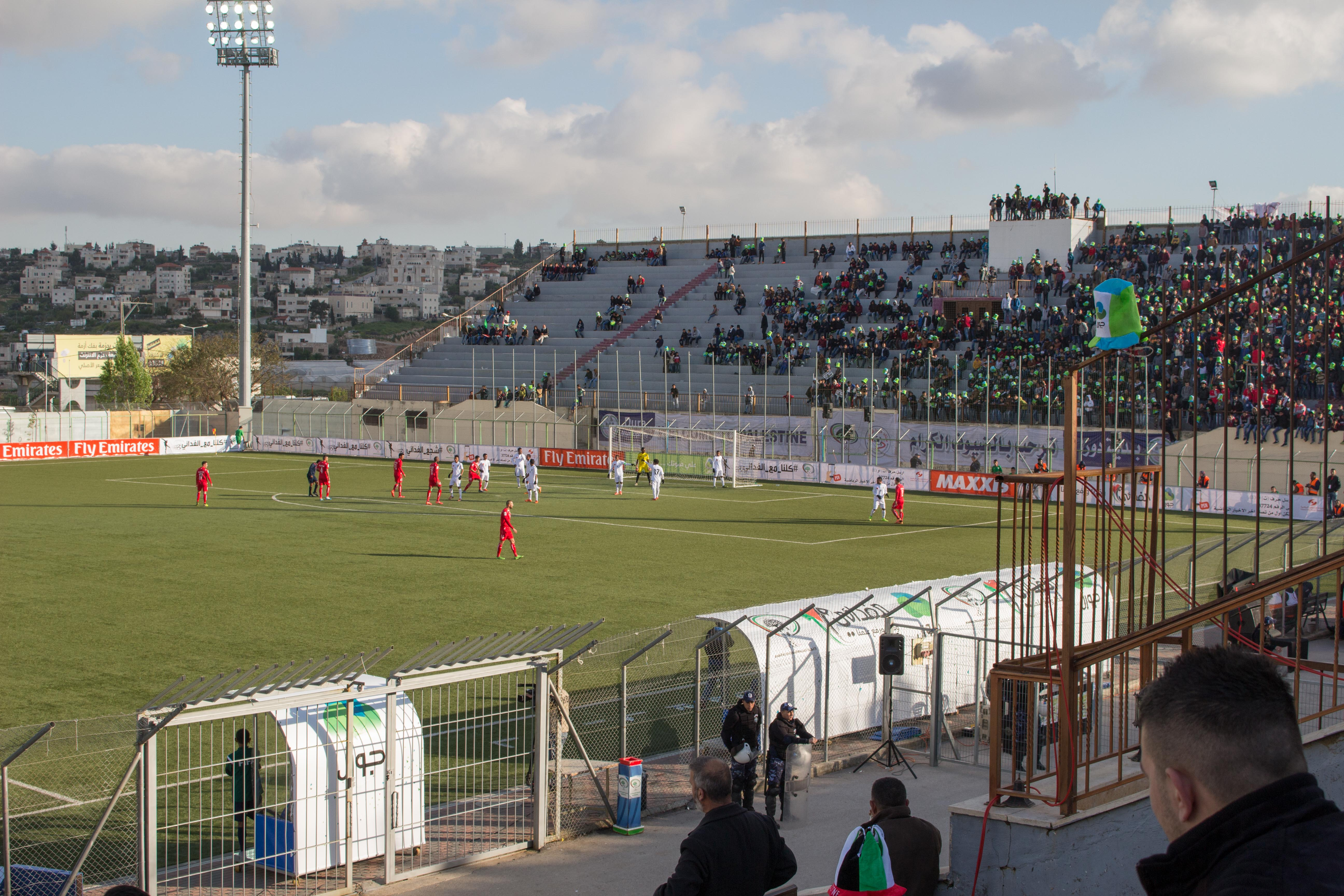
Dura International Stadium

After the Palestinian National Authority was ceded control of the town in 1995, a local committee was set up to prevent land confiscation from the town and the municipal council was expanded. Many Palestinian ministries and governmental institutions opened offices in Dura, enhancing its role in Palestinian politics.

In 1999, Israeli PM Ehud Barak proposed constructing a bridge linking Beit Hanoun and Dura, in order to connect the West Bank with the Gaza Strip.

In 2011 the Dura International Stadium was renovated. It can hold up to 18,000 spectators and hosts national and international games.

The Dura Municipal Rehabilitation Center assists Palestinian Authority residents with special needs and developmental disabilities. Occupational therapy, visual rehabilitation for the seeing impaired, and outreach program are some of the services offered.

Dura has a public library, swimming pool, and a park which includes a children's theater.

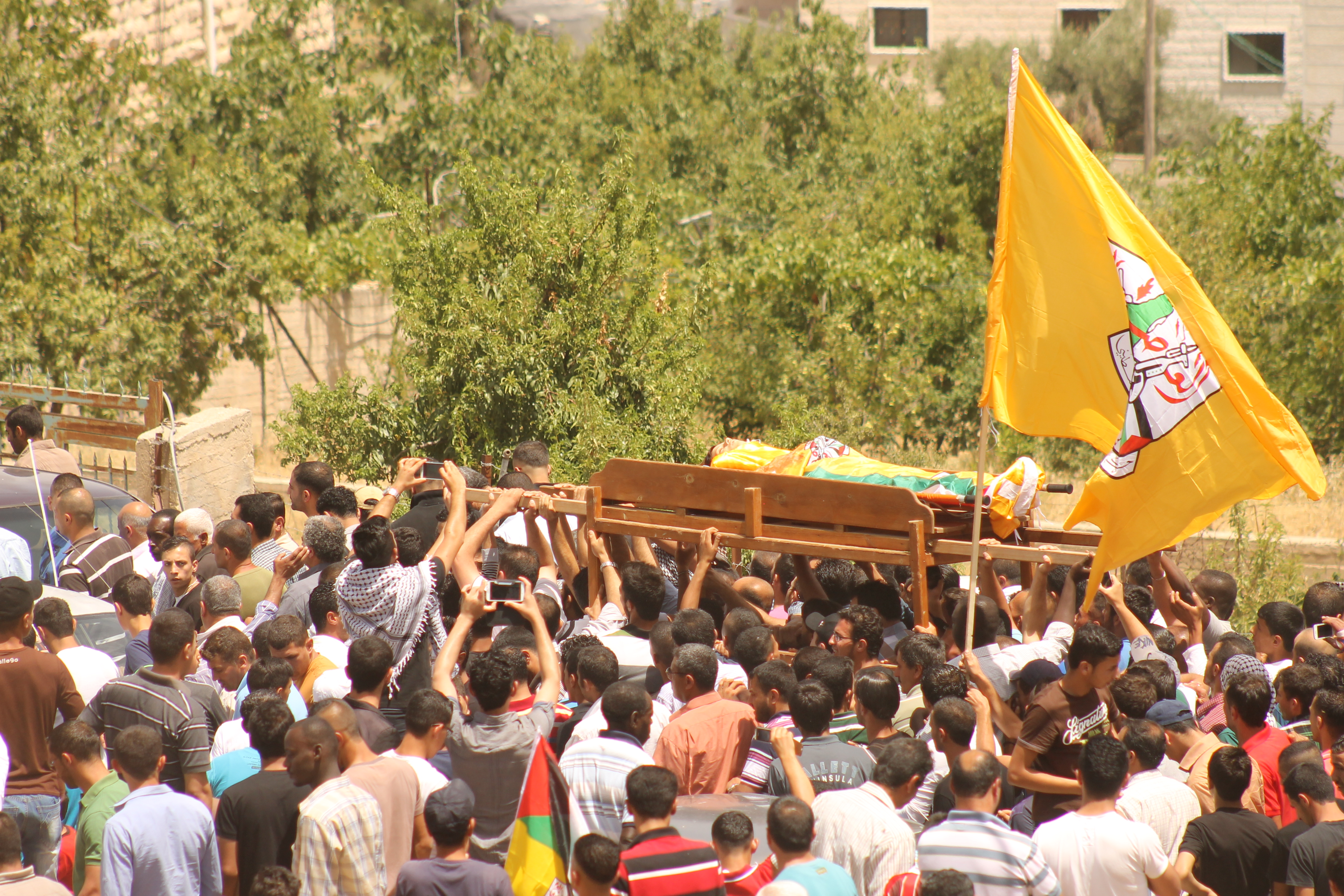
Mohammed Dudin funeral

In June 2014, during the search to find three kidnapped boys, 150 Israeli soldiers stormed Dura's Haninia neighbourhood in a dawn raid to detain a person, and were met by young men and boys throwing rocks. An Israeli soldier shot and killed a teenager who was among the rock throwers, 13 or 15-year-old Mohammed Dudeen.

The city has experienced a water crisis since the Israeli occupation and has been described as "among the most water-deprived in the West Bank." The city has no wells or reservoirs relies on a single pipe for its primary water supply.

=== Israeli settlement ===
The Israeli settlement of Adora, Har Hevron is located 4 kilometers north of the town in the Judaean Mountains and has 575 inhabitants. The international community considers Israeli settlements in the West Bank illegal under international law.

== Demography ==
Dura is home to several clans, such as Al Swaty, Al 'Amayra, Amro, Al Sharha, Al Darweash, Al Maslamea', Al Darbeai', and Al Awawda'. The Al 'Amayra (or 'Amr) clan, with families like Haji and Muhammad, has long-standing roots in Dura. They owned lands in the area and allowed migrant families to cultivate and utilized some lands as tenants.

According to one account, the Maslamea' family came from Beit Jala.

Another important clan in Dura is the Rajoub clan, with well-known figures like Jibril Rajoub. About 6,000 people make up this clan, and they also live in nearby offshoot villages of Dura, including al-Kum, Beit Maqdum, Humsa and Ikrisa. Based on one family member's account, the Rajoub family's oral tradition links their roots to a Yemenite Jew who converted to Islam centuries ago.

== Climate ==
The climate of Dura is dry in the summers and experiences moderate precipitation during winter. Average annual precipitation depend on specific geographic locations within the town. The area of Dahr Alhadaba receives an annual average of 400–600 mm of rain, southern slopes 300–400 mm and the northern region of the Dura hills 250–300.

== Landmarks ==
A local Palestinian legend has it that the patriarch Noah, in Islamic tradition called "(Nabi) Nūh", was buried in Dura, and a shrine there commemorates this tradition.

== Notable residents ==
- Nabil Amr (born 1947), politician
- Hamze Awawde (born 1990), peace activist
- Majed Abu Sharar (1936-1981), political leader

== Bibliography ==
- Avi-Yonah, M. (1977). The Holy Land: a historical geography from the Persian to the Arab conquest (536 B.C. to A.D. 640). Grand Rapids: Baker Book House.
- Barron, J.B., ed. (1923). Palestine: Report and General Abstracts of the Census of 1922. Government of Palestine.
- Berrett, L.M.C. (1996). Discovering the World of the Bible. Grandin Book Company. p. 196. ISBN 9780910523523.
- Conder, C.R.; Kitchener, H.H. (1883). The Survey of Western Palestine: Memoirs of the Topography, Orography, Hydrography, and Archaeology. Vol. 3. London: Committee of the Palestine Exploration Fund.
- Dauphin, C. (1998). La Palestine byzantine, Peuplement et Populations. BAR International Series 726 (in French). Vol. III : Catalogue. Oxford: Archeopress. ISBN 0-860549-05-4.
- Government of Jordan, Department of Statistics (1964). First Census of Population and Housing. Volume I: Final Tables; General Characteristics of the Population (PDF).
- Government of Palestine, Department of Statistics (1945). Village Statistics, April, 1945.
- Guérin, V. (1869). Description Géographique Historique et Archéologique de la Palestine (in French). Vol. 1: Judee, pt. 3. Paris: L'Imprimerie Nationale.
- Hadawi, S. (1970). Village Statistics of 1945: A Classification of Land and Area ownership in Palestine. Palestine Liberation Organization Research Center.
- Hartmann, M. (1883). "Die Ortschaftenliste des Liwa Jerusalem in dem türkischen Staatskalender für Syrien auf das Jahr 1288 der Flucht (1871)". Zeitschrift des Deutschen Palästina-Vereins. 6: 102–149.
- Hütteroth, W.-D.; Abdulfattah, K. (1977). Historical Geography of Palestine, Transjordan and Southern Syria in the Late 16th Century. Erlanger Geographische Arbeiten, Sonderband 5. Erlangen, Germany: Vorstand der Fränkischen Geographischen Gesellschaft. ISBN 3-920405-41-2.
- Kitchener, H.H. (1878). "Lieut Kitchener's reports". Quarterly Statement - Palestine Exploration Fund. 10: 10–15. doi:10.1179/peq.1878.10.1.10.
- Mills, E., ed. (1932). Census of Palestine 1931. Population of Villages, Towns and Administrative Areas. Jerusalem: Government of Palestine.
- Mukaddasi (1895). Description of Syria, including Palestine. Translator: G. Le Strange. Palestine Pilgrims' Text Society.
- Palmer, E.H. (1881). The Survey of Western Palestine: Arabic and English Name Lists Collected During the Survey by Lieutenants Conder and Kitchener, R. E. Transliterated and Explained by E.H. Palmer. Committee of the Palestine Exploration Fund.
- Robinson, E.; Smith, E. (1841). Biblical Researches in Palestine, Mount Sinai and Arabia Petraea: A Journal of Travels in the year 1838. Vol. 3. Boston: Crocker & Brewster.
- Sharon, M. (2013). Corpus Inscriptionum Arabicarum Palaestinae, H-I. Vol. 5. BRILL. ISBN 978-90-04-25097-0.
- Socin, A. (1879). "Alphabetisches Verzeichniss von Ortschaften des Paschalik Jerusalem". Zeitschrift des Deutschen Palästina-Vereins. 2: 135–163.
