= Hebron Governorate =

Governorate of Palestine

- Governorate
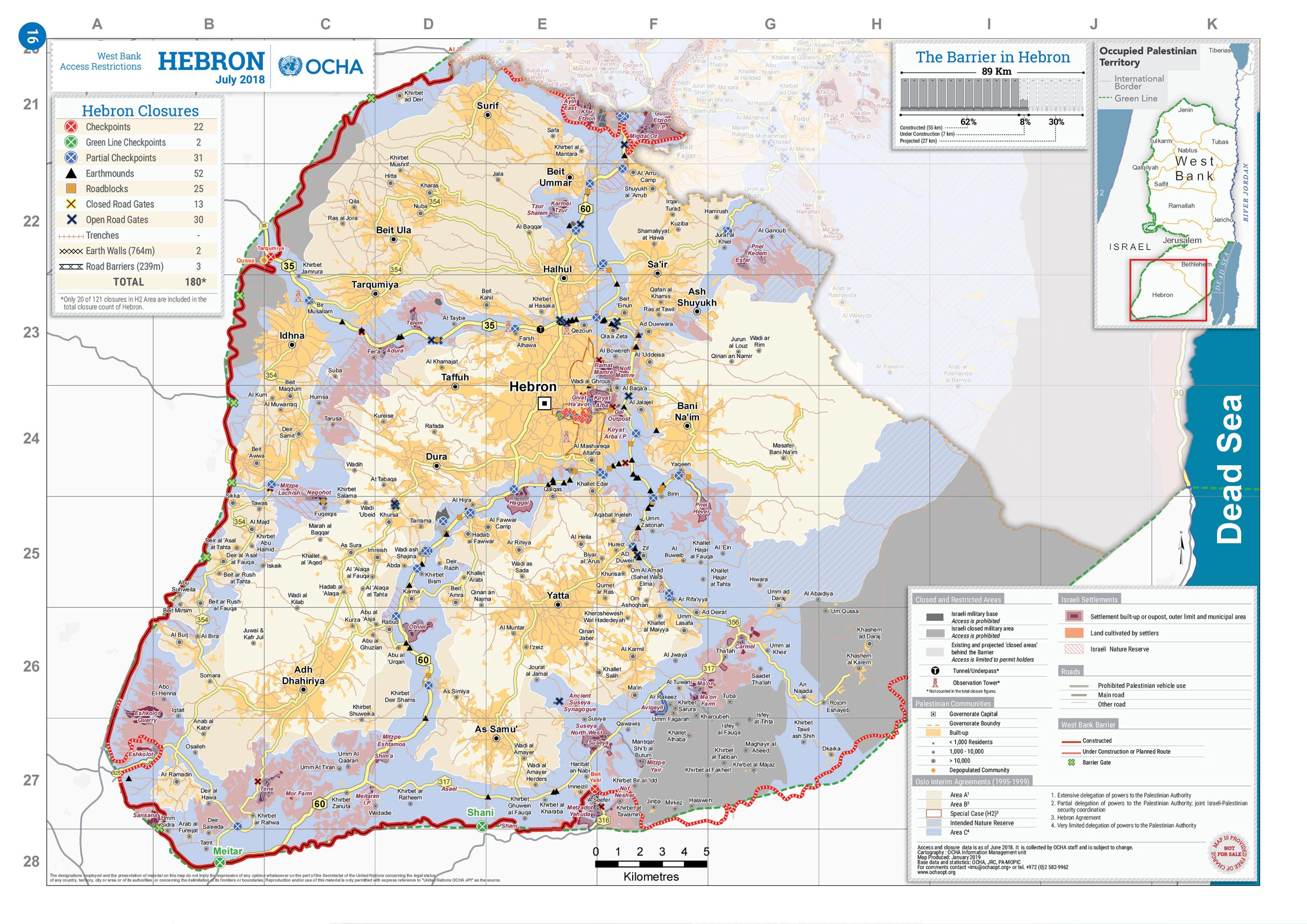
- 2018 United Nations map of the area, showing the Israeli occupation arrangements in the governorate

- Interactive map of Hebron Governorate
- Coordinates: 31.5°N 35.1°E
- Country: Palestine

Area
  - Total: 1,060 km^{2} (410 sq mi)

Population (2017 Census)
  - Total: 711,223
- This figure excludes the Israeli West Bank settlements
- ISO 3166 code: PS-HBN

The Hebron Governorate (Arabic: محافظة الخليل, romanized: Muḥāfaẓat al-Khalīl) is an administrative district of Palestine in the southern West Bank.

The governorate's land area is 1,060 square kilometres (410 sq mi) and its population according to the Palestinian Central Bureau of Statistics in mid-year 2019 was 1,004,510. This makes the Hebron Governorate the largest of 16 governorates in both population and land area in the Palestinian territories. The city of Hebron is the district capital or muhfaza (seat) of the governorate. The current Governor of Hebron is Khaled Dudin.

During the first six months of the First Intifada 42 people in Hebron Governorate were killed by the Israeli army.

== Localities ==
The Hebron Governorate has a total of seven cities and eighteen towns. The governorate also contains more than 100 Bedouin villages and settlements that are not listed below.

=== Cities ===
- Dura
- Halhul
- Hebron (capital)
- Yatta
- ad-Dhahiriya

=== Municipalities ===
The following localities have municipality status from the Ministry of Local Government of the Palestinian National Authority.

- Bani Na'im
- Beit 'Awwa
- Beit Ula
- Beit Ummar
- Deir Sammit
- Idhna
- Kharas
- Nuba
- Sa'ir
- as-Samu
- Surif
- Tarqumiya
- Taffuh

=== Village councils ===
The following have populations over 1,000 persons.

- Al Baqa
- Beit 'Amra
- Beit Einun
- Beit Kahil
- Beit ar-Rush al-Fauqa
- al-Burj
- Deir al-'Asal al-Fauqa
- ad-Duwwara
- Hadab al-Fawwar
- al-Heila
- Hureiz
- Imreish
- Jinba
- Karma
- al-Karmil
- Khalet al-Maiyya
- Khursa
- Ruq'a
- al-Kum
- Al-Muwarraq
- As Simiya
- Khirbet Safa
- Khirbat al-Simia
- Kuseis
- al-Majd
- Qalqas
- Qila
- al-Ramadien
- ar-Rihiya
- ash-Shuyukh
- Shuyukh al-Arrub
- as-Sura
- at-Tabaqa
- al-Uddeisa
- Zif

=== Refugee camps ===
- al-Arroub
- al-Fawwar

== Demographics ==
| Year | Muslims | Christians | Jews | Total | Notes and sources |
|---|---|---|---|---|---|
| 1538 | 749 h | 7 h | 20 h | 776 h | (h = households), Cohen & Lewis |
| 1774 | | | 300 | | Azulai |
| 1817 | | | 500 | | Israel Foreign Ministry |
| 1820 | | | 1,000 | | William Turner |
| 1824 | | | 60 h | | (40 h Sephardim, 20 h Ashkenazim), The Missionary Herald |
| 1832 | 400 h | | 100 h | 500 h | (h = households), Augustin Calmet, Charles Taylor, Edward Robinson |
| 1837 | | | 423 | | Montefiore census |
| 1838 | c. 6000–7,000 | "few" | 700 | 7–8,000 | William McClure Thomson |
| 1839 | 1295 f | 1 f | 241 | | (f = families), David Roberts |
| 1840 | | | 700–800 | | James A. Huie |
| 1851 | 11,000 | | 450 | | Official register |
| 1851 | | | 400 | | Clorinda Minor |
| 1866 | | | 497 | | Montefiore census |
| 1871–2 | 2,800 h | | 200 h | 3,000 h | Ottoman records for the Syrian provincial sālnāme for these years |
| 1875 | 8,000–10,000 | | 500 | | Albert Socin |
| 1875 | 17,000 | | 600 | | Hebron Kaymakam |
| 1881 | | | 1,000–1,200 | | PEF Survey of Palestine |
| 1881 | | | 800 | 5,000 | The Friend |
| 1890 | | | 1,490 | | |
| 1895 | | | 1,400 | | |
| 1906 | | | 1,100 | 14,000 | (690 Sephardim, 410 Ashkenazim) |
| 1922 | 16,074 | 73 | 430 | 16,577 | 1922 census of Palestine |
| 1929 | | | 700 | | Israel Foreign Ministry |
| 1930 | | | 0 | | Israel Foreign Ministry |
| 1931 | 17,277 | 109 | 134 | 17,532 | 1931 census of Palestine |
| 1938 | | | 0 | 20,400 | Village Statistics, 1938 |
| 1945 | 24,400 | 150 | 0 | 24,560 | Village Statistics, 1945 |
| 1961 | | | | 37,868 | Jordanian census |
| 1967 | 38,073 | 136 | | 38,348 | Israeli census |
| 1997 | n/a | n/a | | 119,093 | Palestinian census |
| 2007 | n/a | n/a | | 163,146 | Palestinian census |

== See also ==
- Governorates of Palestine
