= Palestinian Village council =

Type of local government used in the Palestinian National Authority

A Village council is a type of local government used in the Palestinian Authority localities that usually number between 800 and 3,000+ inhabitants. The village council is also known D-level municipalities. There are 355 village councils in Palestine.

Village councils could consist of three to eleven members, including a chairman, a deputy chairman and secretary. The chairman is the head of the council. Unlike municipalities, village councils do not hold elections; rather, the representatives of a village's largest clans choose a chairman who is then appointed by the Local Government Minister of the Palestinian National Authority.

== See also ==
- List of cities in Palestine
- Palestinian refugee camps
