= Wadi Ubeid =

Village in Hebron Governorate, Palestine

Wadi Ubeid Arabic: وادي عبيد
- Wadi Ubeid
- Location of Wadi Ubeid within Palestine
- Country: Palestine
- Governorate: Hebron Governorate
- Elevation: 726 m (2,382 ft)

Population (2007)
  - Total: 130

Wadi Ubeid is a Palestinian village located west of the city of Dura in the Hebron Governorate, in the southern West Bank.

== Geography ==
Wadi Ubeid is approximately 4 km from the city of Dura and 12 km from the city of Hebron. It is 726 meters above sea level.

It is bordered to the north by the lands of At-Tabaqa, to the east by Khursa, to the south by as-Sura, and to the west by Khirbet Salama.

== Population ==
The village's population in 2007 was approximately 130, according to the Palestinian Central Bureau of Statistics.

== See also ==
- Hebron Governorate
- Dura, Hebron
