= Al-Muwarraq =

Village in Hebron Governorate, Palestine

Al-Muwarraq Arabic: المورق
- Al-Muwarraq
- Location of Al-Muwarraq within Palestine
- Country: Palestine
- Governorate: Hebron Governorate
- Elevation: 470 m (1,540 ft)

Population (2017)
  - Total: 839

Al-Muwarraq is one of the villages of Dura in the Hebron Governorate, located west of the city of Hebron, approximately 15 kilometers south of the West Bank.

== Geography ==
It is approximately 470 meters above sea level and is bordered by:

- To the south: As Simiya
- To the north: Beit Maqdum
- To the east: :Deir Sammit
- To the west: Al-Kum

== Population ==
The population in 1961 was approximately 150, and in 2017, the population was approximately 839, according to the Palestinian census.

== See also ==
- Dura, Hebron
- Hebron Governorate
- Khirbet el-Muraq – Herodian-era mansion located in the village
