= Tawas, Hebron =

Community in Palestine

Tawas
- Tawas, Hebron Arabic: طواس (الخليل)
- Location within the West Bank
- Country: State of Palestine
- Governorate: Hebron Governorate

Government
  - Type: Village council (part of Sikka–Tawas)

Population (2017)
  - Total: 204
- Palestinian Central Bureau of Statistics
- Time zone: UTC+2 (EET)
  - Summer (DST): UTC+3 (EEST)

Tawas (Arabic: طواس) is a Palestinian community within the Sikka and Tawas Village Council, located to the west of the Hebron Governorate in the southern West Bank.

== Geography ==
Tawas is situated west of Hebron, in the hilly terrain that marks the transition between the Hebron highlands and the plains further west. Together with the nearby locality of Sikka, it forms a joint village council. The community is characterized by agricultural land, particularly olive groves and cereal fields, alongside some residential and grazing areas.

== History ==
French explorer Victor Guérin visited the area in the 19th century, noting its small size and rural character. During the British Mandate of Palestine, the village was listed together with Sikka in official surveys, reflecting its longstanding administrative association with the neighboring locality.

Following the 1948 Arab–Israeli War and the 1949 Armistice Agreements, Tawas came under Jordanian rule. Since the Six-Day War in 1967, it has been under Israeli occupation. The Oslo Accords classified much of the surrounding land as Area C, placing restrictions on building and land use.

== Demographics ==
According to the Palestinian Central Bureau of Statistics, Tawas had a population of 204 in the 2017 census. Most residents belong to extended families that are also found in neighboring villages of the Hebron Governorate.

== Economy ==
The economy of Tawas is primarily based on small-scale agriculture and livestock herding, with olives, grapes, and field crops as the main produce. Some residents are also employed in Hebron and surrounding towns. Development in the village is hampered by limited infrastructure, restrictions on land use, and dependence on the joint council with Sikka for public services.

== Israeli settlements and land issues ==
According to the Applied Research Institute–Jerusalem (ARIJ), land from Tawas has been subject to confiscation for the construction and expansion of nearby Israeli settlements. Large areas of village land classified as Area C are under the control of the Israeli Civil Administration, restricting Palestinian building and agricultural use. ARIJ reports that residents face difficulties accessing agricultural land due to closures, settler activity, and the proximity of settlement infrastructure such as bypass roads. These restrictions have contributed to economic decline and out-migration from the village.

== See also ==
- Sikka, Hebron
- Hebron Governorate

== Bibliography ==
- Guérin, V. (1869). Description Géographique Historique et Archéologique de la Palestine (in French). Vol. 1: Judee, pt. 2. Paris: L'Imprimerie Nationale.
