= Beit Awwa =

Beit Awwa بيت عَوَّا
- Municipality type B

Arabic transcription(s)
  - Arabic: بيت عوّا
  - Latin: Khirbet Beit 'Awwa (official); Bayt 'Awwa (unofficial)
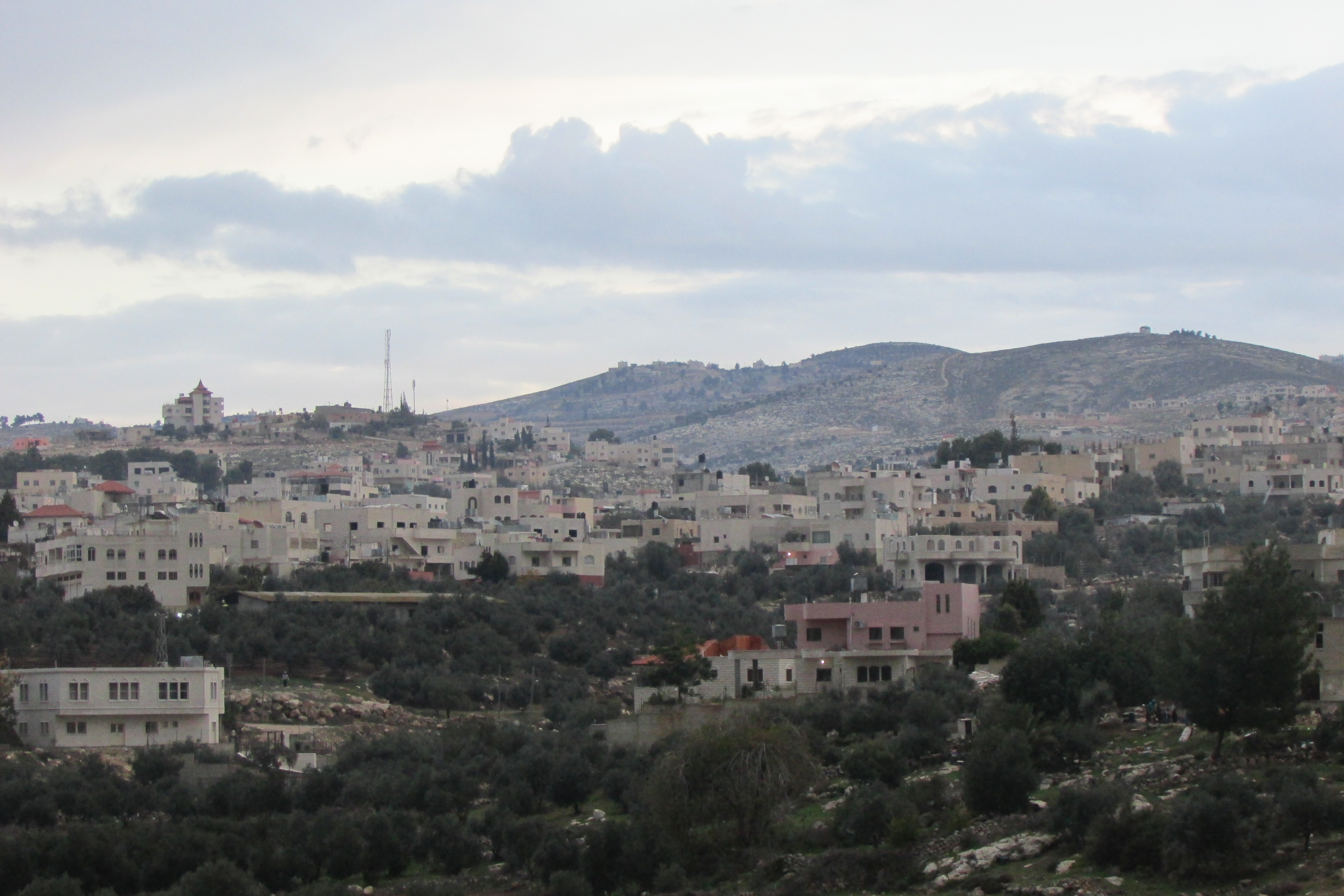
- Beit Awwa, 2015

- Location of Beit Awwa within Palestine
- Coordinates: 31°30′31″N 34°57′01″E
- Palestine grid: 145/101
- State: State of Palestine
- Governorate: Hebron

Government
  - Type: Municipality

Area
  - Total: 0.5 km^{2} (0.19 sq mi)

Population (2017)
  - Total: 10,436
  - Density: 21,000/km^{2} (54,000/sq mi)
- Name meaning: "House of Auwa"

Beit Awwa (Arabic: بيت عوّا) is a Palestinian town in the southern West Bank, in the Hebron Governorate of the State of Palestine, located 22 kilometres (14 mi) west of Hebron and 4 kilometers west of Dura. According to the Palestinian Central Bureau of Statistics, Beit Awwa had a population of 10,436 inhabitants in 2017.

Beit Awwa saw ruins and artificial caves noted by various visitors throughout the 19th century. Following the 1948 Arab–Israeli War, it came under Jordanian rule, then Israeli occupation after the Six-Day War in 1967. Today, it is home to prominent clans, the Masalmea and Al Swaty.

== Geography ==
From the east is Fuqeiqis, from the west is the Green Line, from the south is Sikka, Hebron, and from the north is As Simiya.

== History ==
In 1838, during the Ottoman era, Edward Robinson noted Beit 'Auwa as a place "in ruins or deserted," part of the area between the mountains and Gaza, but subject to the government of el-Khulil. He further remarked that the ruins "covering low hills on both sides of the path, exhibiting foundations of hewn stones, from which all that can be inferred is, that here was once an extensive town."

In 1863, Victor Guérin visited Beit Awwa, which he called Khirbet Beit el-Haoua. He described finding many artificial caves, some of which were large and had shaped domes, other smaller with square ceilings. Most entries were surrounded by piles of stones from old demolished buildings.

In 1875, the Palestine Exploration Fund's Survey of Palestine visited Beit Awwa. They described several ruins, each with a different name;

"Khurbet es Sueity, Khurbet el Mehami, Khurbet el Kusah are all sites with foundations and caves. El Kusr is an ancient watch-tower, with drystone walls in ruins; el Keniseh seems to be a ruined church; foundations, capitals, shafts, and lintels with the Maltese cross on them, remain showing a Byzantine building. There is also a fine font fitted for immersion. In the centre a square basin, 2 feet 3 inches side, 7 inches deep; four steps lead down, 5 inches high, 9 inches broad; the whole surrounded by four segmental recesses, the external form of the font being that of a rounded cross, the longest measurement either way being 5 feet, and the total height outside 2 feet 4 inches."

=== British Mandate era ===
At the time of the 1931 census of Palestine the population of Beit Awwa was counted under Dura.

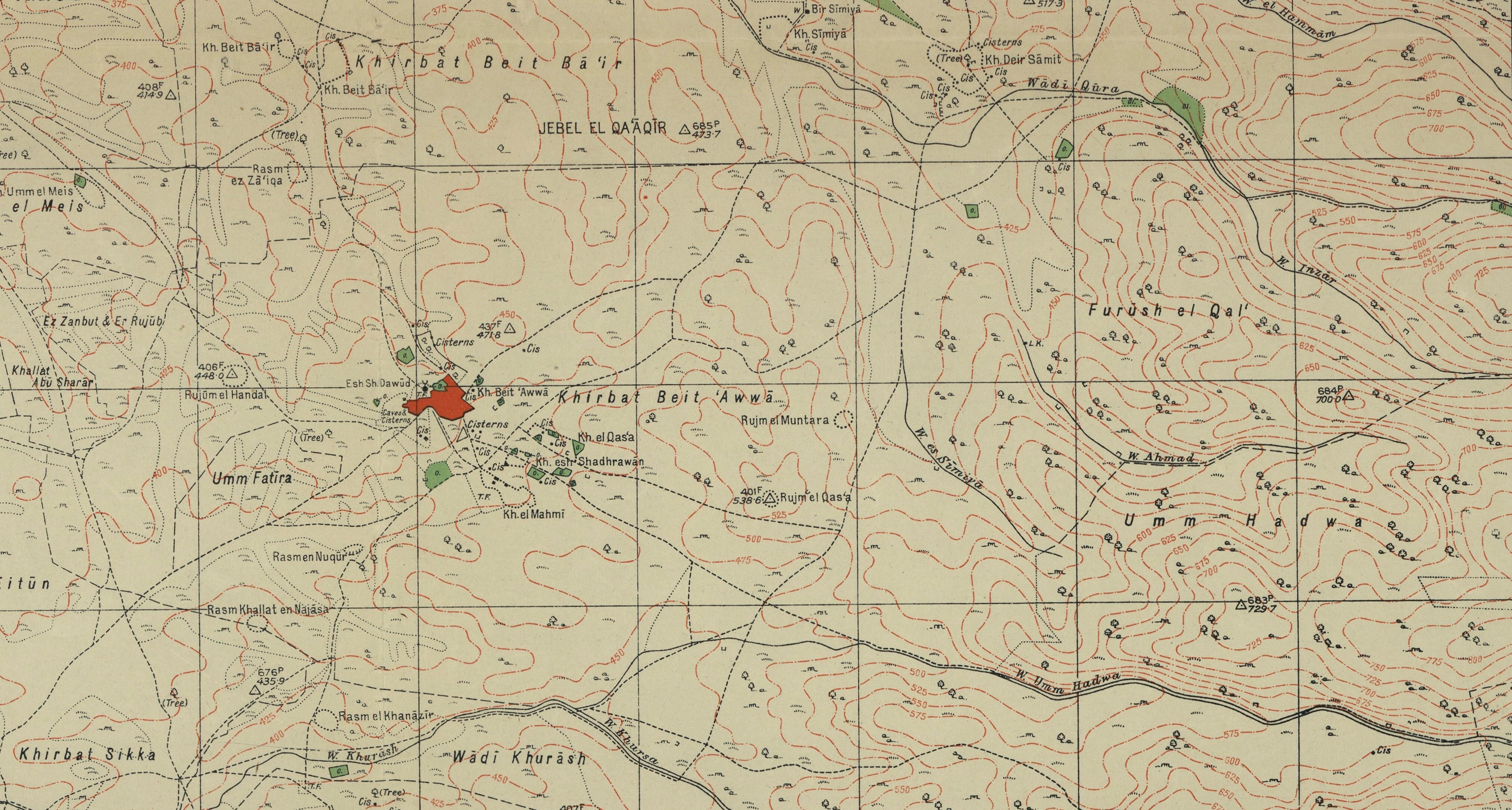
Beit Awwa 1933 1:20,000

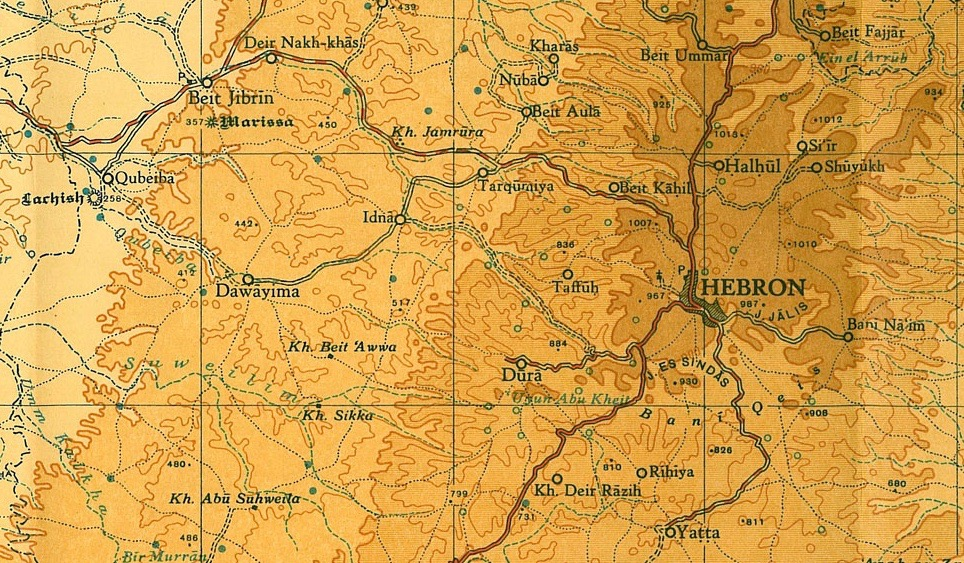
Beit Awwa 1945 1:250.000

=== Jordanian era ===
In November 1948, during the 1948 Arab-Israeli War soldiers from the Israeli 5th Brigade attacked Beit Awwa, Idhna and Kh. Sikka. At Beit Awwa, the attackers were driven off. In March 1949, the 4th Brigade attacked Beit Awwa and surrounding villages. Their attack orders were to "hit every [adult male] Arab" they encountered. All in all, they drove out 7,000 people eastward. With UN the villagers were eventually allowed back.

In the wake of the 1948 Arab–Israeli War, and after the 1949 Armistice Agreements, Beit Awwa came under Jordanian rule.

In 1961, the population of Beit Awwa was 1,368.

=== 1967, aftermath ===
After the Six-Day War in 1967, Beit Awwa has been under Israeli occupation.

The population in the 1967 census conducted by the Israeli authorities was 1,468. After the 1967 six day war Beit Awwa was completely destroyed. Moshe Dayan claimed the destruction was carried out under the orders of an officer who wished to expel the residents, Brigadier General Uzi Narkiss claimed the credit for the action.

Its total land area is 470 dunams (0.47 km^{2}; 0.18 sq mi), 30% of it lands before 1948; due to the town's proximity Green Line hundreds of dunams are a part of modern-day Israel.

=== 21st-century ===
On 18 March 2026, three Palestinian women were killed and eight others injured by the "direct impact of missile shrapnel" on a beauty salon during the 2026 Iran war, after an earlier report said that there had been four fatalities in the incident. The origin of the projectile was initially undetermined, though the Israeli military attributed the incident to an Iranian cluster munition; this claim was not confirmed by Palestinian officials and remained independently unverified. Palestinian medics said the deaths were caused by "shrapnel falling".

== Economy ==
Beit Awwa is among the Hebron Governorate locations where almonds are cultivated.

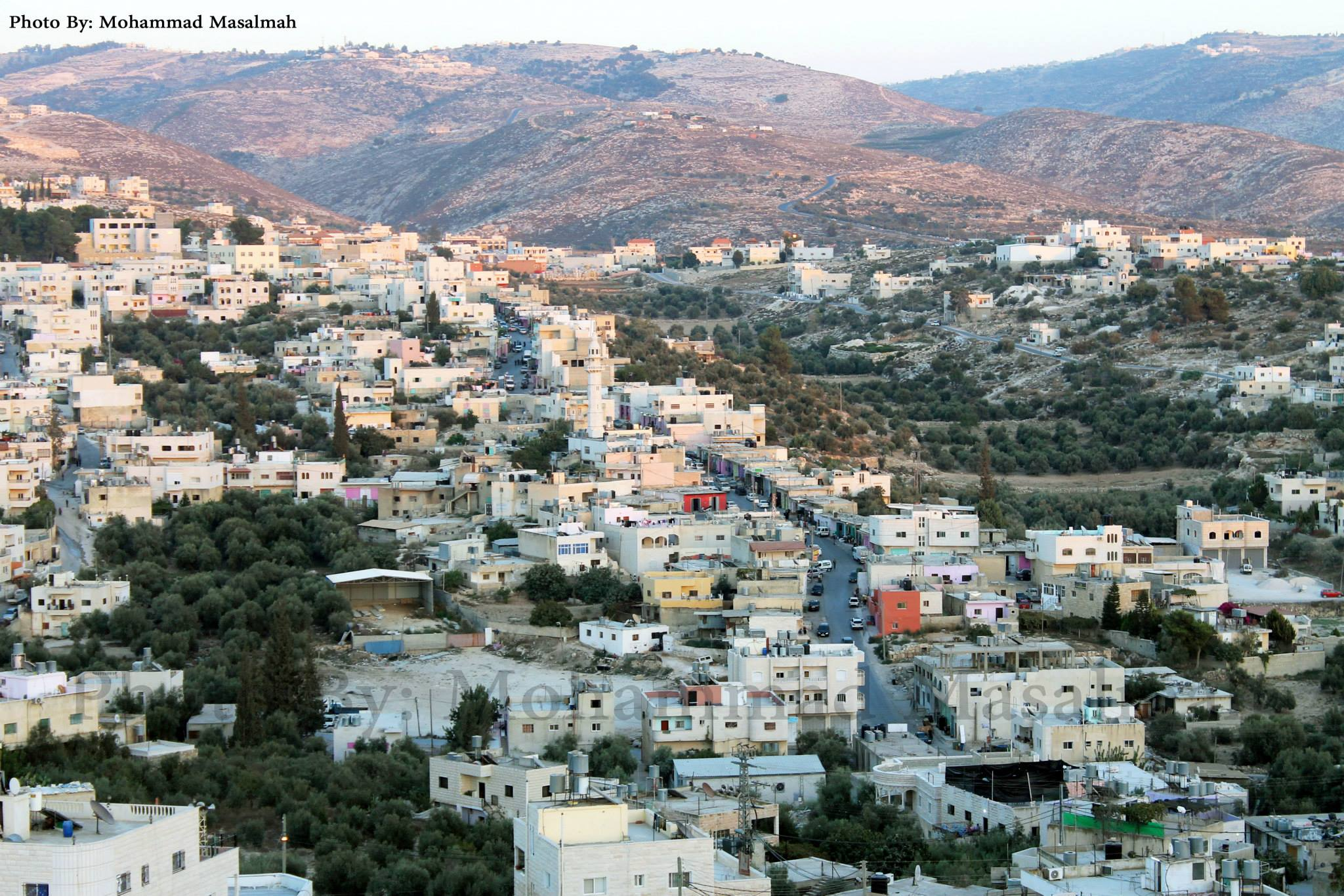

== Population ==
The two prominent clans of Beit 'Awwa are Masalmea and Al Swaty. The Al Swaty clan relocated to the region either from ar-Ramtha, Jordan, or, according to another account, from what is today the northern West Bank, passing through the Judean Lowlands. The Masalmea family originated from Beit Jala.

== Bibliography ==
- Conder, C.R.; Kitchener, H.H. (1883). The Survey of Western Palestine: Memoirs of the Topography, Orography, Hydrography, and Archaeology. Vol. 3. London: Committee of the Palestine Exploration Fund.
- Government of Jordan, Department of Statistics (1964). First Census of Population and Housing. Volume I: Final Tables; General Characteristics of the Population (PDF).
- Guérin, V. (1869). Description Géographique Historique et Archéologique de la Palestine (in French). Vol. 1: Judee, pt. 2. Paris: L'Imprimerie Nationale.
- Mills, E., ed. (1932). Census of Palestine 1931. Population of Villages, Towns and Administrative Areas. Jerusalem: Government of Palestine.
- Morris, B. (2004). The Birth of the Palestinian Refugee Problem Revisited. Cambridge University Press. ISBN 978-0-521-00967-6.
- Palmer, E.H. (1881). The Survey of Western Palestine: Arabic and English Name Lists Collected During the Survey by Lieutenants Conder and Kitchener, R. E. Transliterated and Explained by E.H. Palmer. Committee of the Palestine Exploration Fund.
- Robinson, E.; Smith, E. (1841). Biblical Researches in Palestine, Mount Sinai and Arabia Petraea: A Journal of Travels in the year 1838. Vol. 3. Boston: Crocker & Brewster.
- Segev, T. (2007). 1967: Israel, the War, and the Year that Transformed the Middle East. Translated by Jessica Cohen. Macmillan. ISBN 978-0-8050-7057-6.
