= Deir Sammit =

Deir Sammit دير سامت
- Municipality type C

Arabic transcription(s)
  - Arabic: دير سامت
- Location of Deir Sammit within Palestine
- Coordinates: 31°31′22″N 34°58′27″E
- Palestine grid: 148/103
- State: State of Palestine
- Governorate: Hebron

Government
  - Type: Municipality

Population (2017)
  - Total: 8,114
- Name meaning: Kh. Deir Sâmat, the ruin of the monastery of the silent man

Deir Sammit (Arabic: دير سامت) is a Palestinian town located eight kilometers west of Hebron. The town is in the Hebron Governorate Southern West Bank. According to the Palestinian Central Bureau of Statistics, the town had a population of 8,114 in 2017.

== Geography ==
From the east is Dura, Hebron, from the west is As Simiya, from the south is Beit Awwa, and from the north is Al-Muwarraq.

== History ==
An amulet composed of a very thin copper sheet with a Christian Palestinian Aramaic inscription was discovered at Deir Sammit.

=== Ottoman period ===
In the early tax registers from the 1500s in the Ottoman Empire, Deir Sammit was noted as being cultivated by the villagers of Suba.

In 1838, it was noted as a place "in ruins or deserted," part of the area between Hebron and Gaza, but under the jurisdiction of Hebron.

In 1863, Victor Guérin called the place Khirbet Deir Samit.

In 1883, the PEF's Survey of Palestine noted "traces of ruins, caves, and cisterns" here.

=== British Mandate era ===
At the time of the 1931 census of Palestine the population of Deir Samit was counted under Dura.

=== Modern era ===
In the wake of the 1948 Arab–Israeli War, and after the 1949 Armistice Agreements, Deir Sammit came under Jordanian rule. The Jordanian census of 1961 found 808 inhabitants in Deir Sammit.

After the Six-Day War in 1967, Deir Sammit has been under Israeli occupation. Since 1995, it has been governed by the Palestinian National Authority as part of Area B of the West Bank.

== Demography ==
The residents of Deir Samit belong to four main families: Al-Haroub, Al-Sharowna, Al-Sharha', and the Al'Awawdh family. The local Haribat (Haroub) clan has its origins in Bedouins who migrated from Tubas.

== Bibliography ==
- Conder, C.R.; Kitchener, H.H. (1883). The Survey of Western Palestine: Memoirs of the Topography, Orography, Hydrography, and Archaeology. Vol. 3. London: Committee of the Palestine Exploration Fund.
- Government of Jordan, Department of Statistics (1964). First Census of Population and Housing. Volume I: Final Tables; General Characteristics of the Population (PDF).
- Guérin, V. (1869). Description Géographique Historique et Archéologique de la Palestine (in French). Vol. 1: Judee, pt. 2. Paris: L'Imprimerie Nationale.
- Mills, E., ed. (1932). Census of Palestine 1931. Population of Villages, Towns and Administrative Areas. Jerusalem: Government of Palestine.
- Palmer, E.H. (1881). The Survey of Western Palestine: Arabic and English Name Lists Collected During the Survey by Lieutenants Conder and Kitchener, R. E. Transliterated and Explained by E.H. Palmer. Committee of the Palestine Exploration Fund.
- Robinson, E.; Smith, E. (1841). Biblical Researches in Palestine, Mount Sinai and Arabia Petraea: A Journal of Travels in the year 1838. Vol. 3. Boston: Crocker & Brewster.
- Toledano, E. (1984). "The Sanjaq of Jerusalem in the Sixteenth Century: Aspects of Topography and Population". Archivum Ottomanicum. 9: 279–319. Archived from the original on 2016-03-05.
