= Horvat Eleq =

Archaeological site in northern Israel

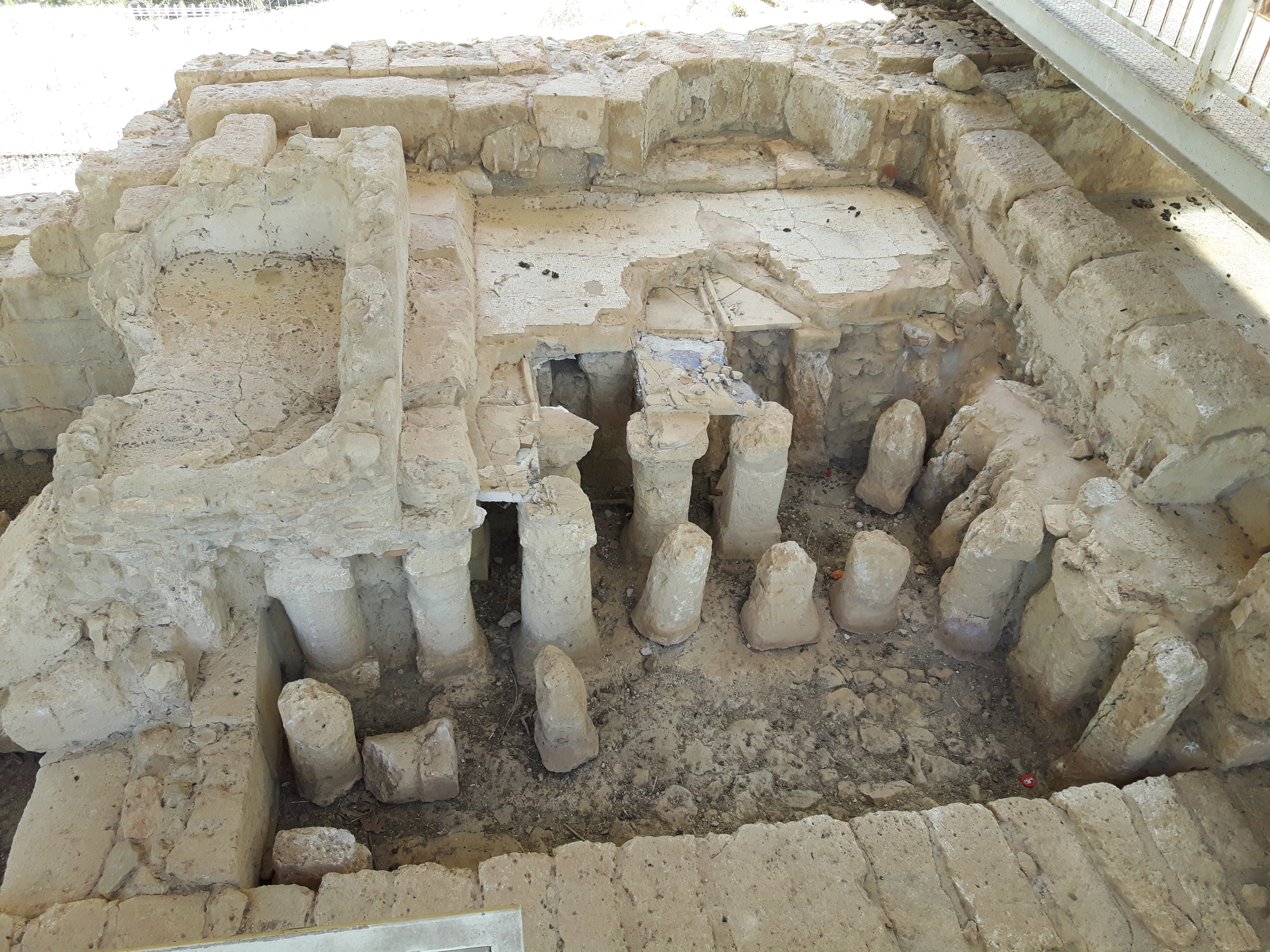
Remains of a Roman bath

Horvat Eleq is located in the southeastern area of Ramat HaNadiv, at the southern edge of Mount Carmel at an altitude of 141 meters above sea level. Nearby within 10 km are the cities of Dor, Caesarea and their ports, Tel Taninim and Tel Mevorakh to the west and Tel Burga to the southeast.

== History ==
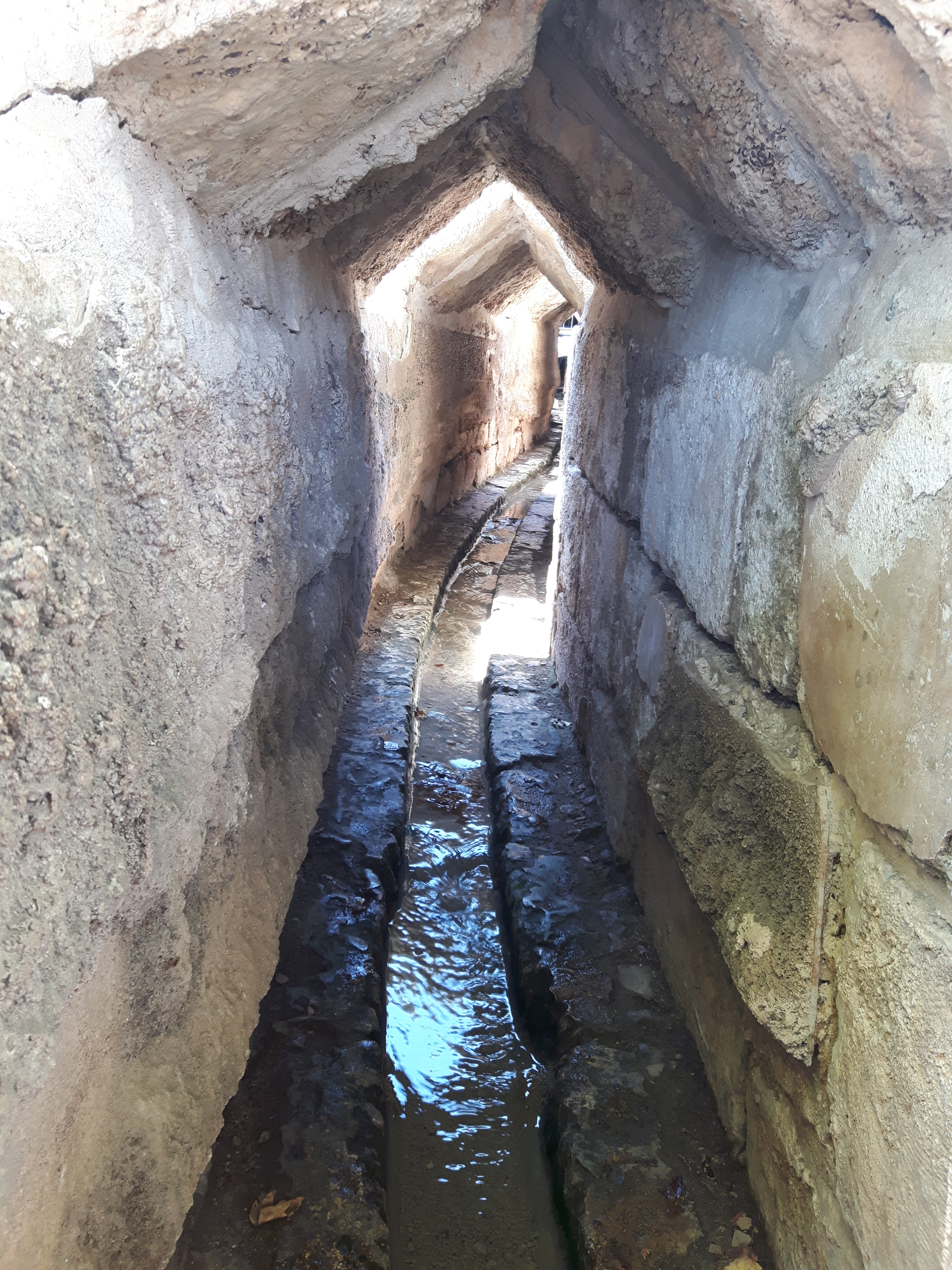
Section of the water aqueduct

Horvat Eleq has almost a continuous history of settlement starting at the Paleolithic period until the Ottoman period. Throughout history the settlement has benefited from its location next to an abundant and constant water source and overlooking two historical roads. Archaeological excavations at the site began in 1989 by Yizhar Hirschfeld and continued almost continuously until 2007. The main remains discovered and studied in the excavations are mainly associated with the end of the Persian period where the remains of a fortified wall are visible and the Hellenistic and Roman periods, as they are the major visible remains today. In the early Roman period, the site reaches its peak in terms of construction and settlement.

After the First Jewish–Roman War the site was abandoned.

== Archeology ==
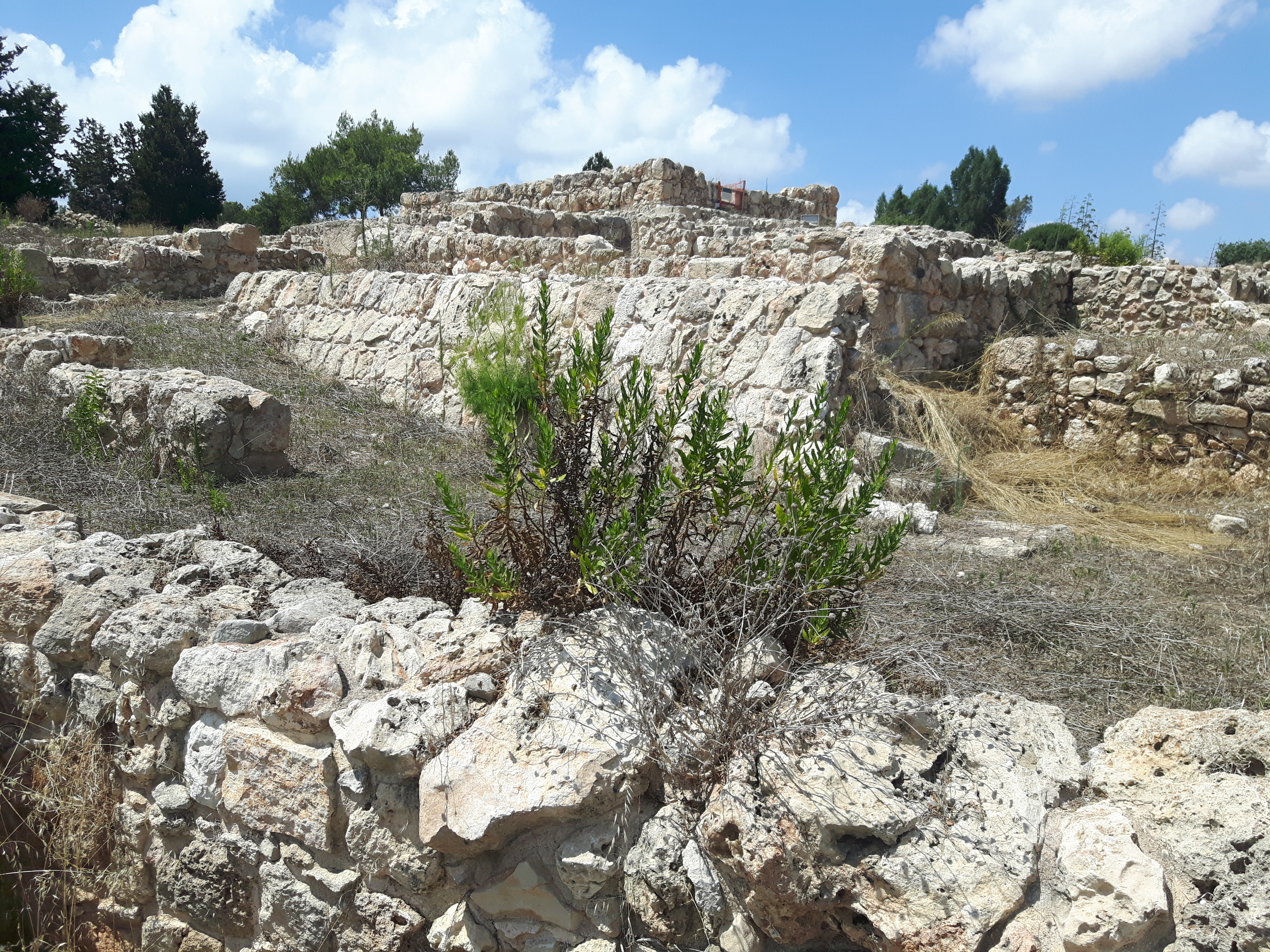
Walls and settlement ruins

Between the years 1989 and 2007, archaeological excavations were conducted continuously at the site. The findings at the site are mainly categorized to five time periods that begin at the end of the Persian period, from which the remains of a fortified wall can be seen, to the end of the Ottoman period, when a Jewish settlement was abandoned.

== See also ==
- Khirbet el-Muraq
