= Tzova =

Tzova: צובה (Hebrew)
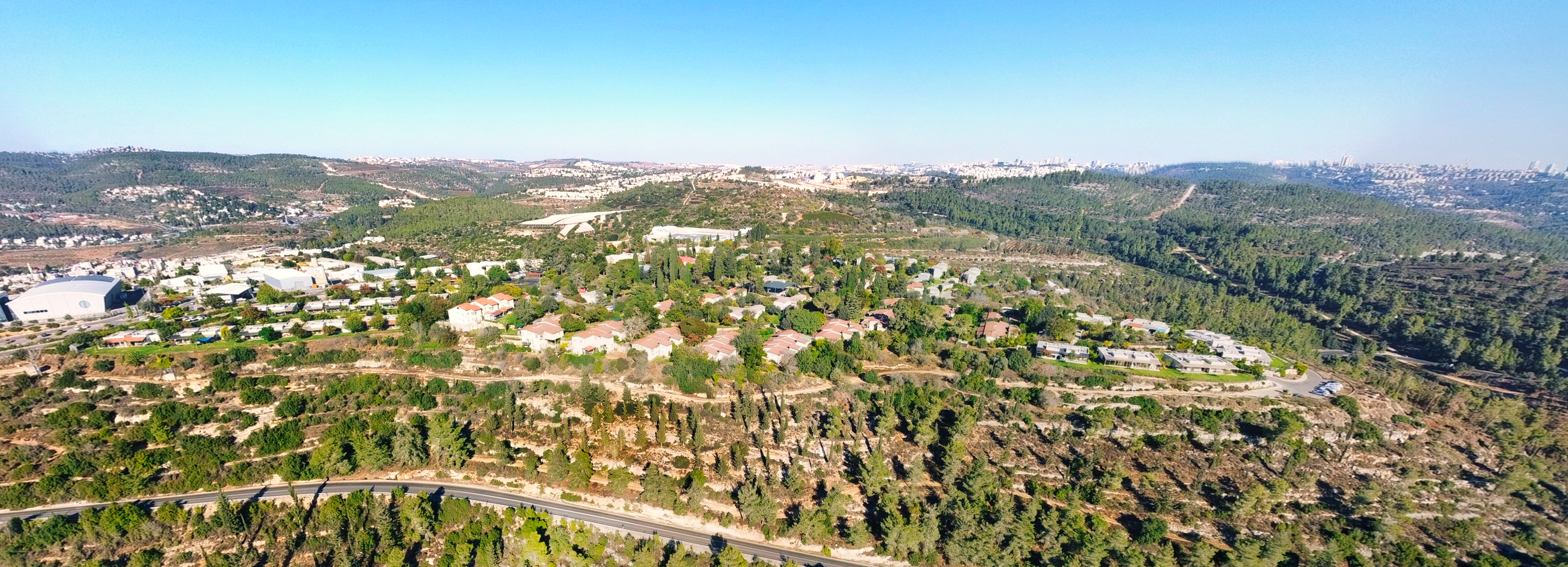

- Location within Jerusalem District Location within Israel
- Coordinates: 31°47′3″N 35°7′11″E
- Country: Israel
- District: Jerusalem
- Council: Mateh Yehuda
- Affiliation: Kibbutz Movement
- Founded: 1000 BCE (Tel Tzova); 1170 (Crusader fortress); 1187 (Suba, Jerusalem); 1948 (Israeli kibbutz)
- Founder: Former Palmach soldiers
- Population (2024): 583
- Website: www.tzuba.org.il

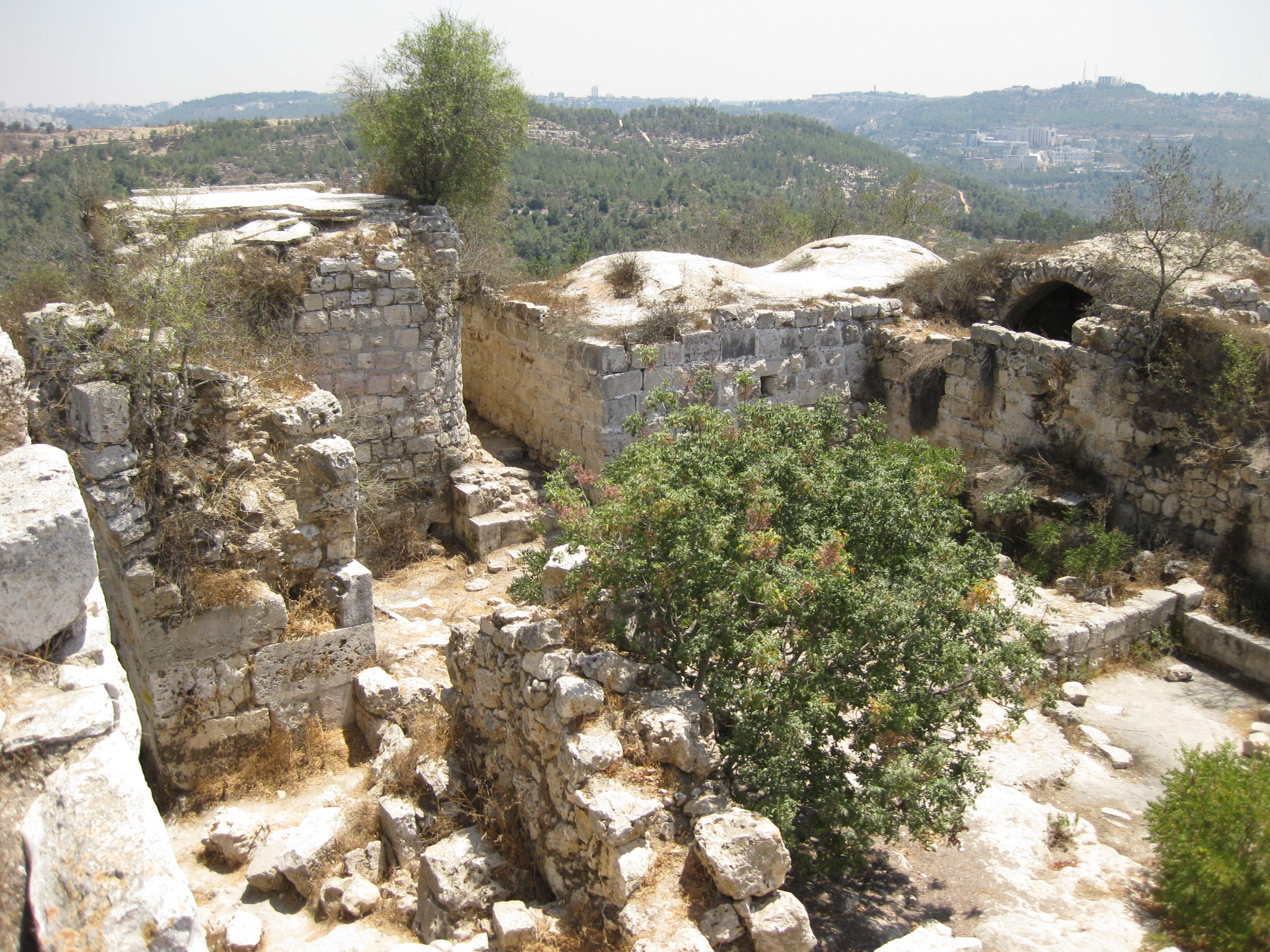
Tel Tzova

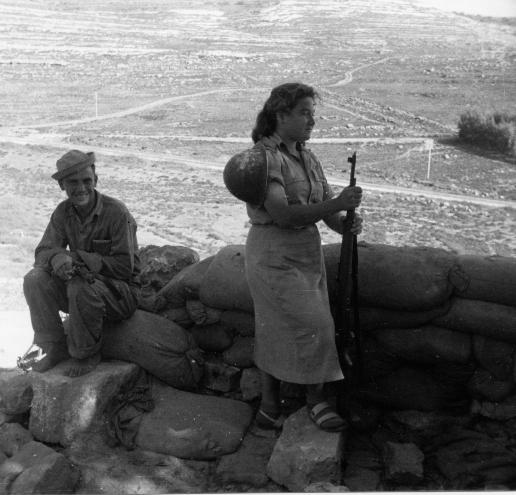
A Harel Brigade lookout post at Tzova in 1948

Tzova (Hebrew: צובה) also Palmach Tzova or Tzuba, is a kibbutz in central Israel. Located in the Judean Hills, on the western outskirts of Jerusalem, it falls under the jurisdiction of Mateh Yehuda Regional Council. In 2024 it had a population of 583.

== Biblical references ==
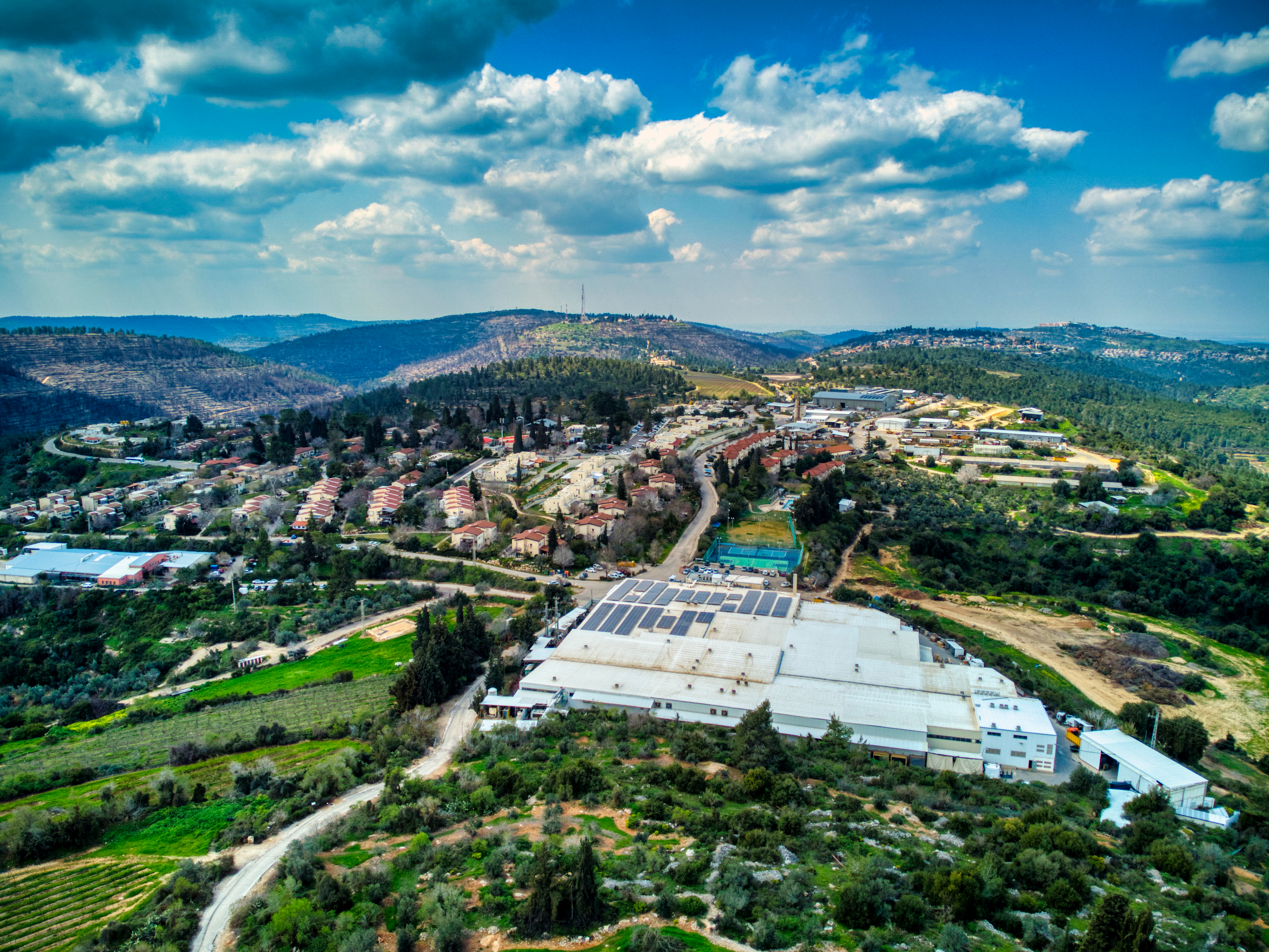
The kibbutz, view from Tel Tzova

The nearby Tel Tzova was the site of an ancient town in the days of David and perhaps of Saul. The Septuagint at Joshua 15:59 gives a list of eleven towns in Judaea, which is missing in the Masoretic text. One of them is given as Σωρης ("Sōrēs") in most manuscripts but as Εωβης ("Eobes") in the Codex Vaticanus. This has led to the suggestion that the original was Σωβης ("Sōbēs"), and that Tsova can thus be dated back to the time of Joshua Bin-Nun, based on this verse in the Septuagint.

The kibbutz's name is also similar to, and is related to, that of the nearby depopulated Palestinian village of Suba.

== History ==
=== Antiquity ===
Middle Bronze Age cairn-tombs were excavated in the vicinity of the ruined Arab village. Excavations at the summit (Tel Tzova) revealed occupation layers predating the Crusader fortress, including pottery and structural remains from the Iron Age (First Temple period) and later Roman–Byzantine phases.

During the Roman and Byzantine periods, some sources describe it as a Jewish village known as Seboim. The Septuagint version of Joshua 15:59 also lists a place called Σωβης (Sōbes), cautiously identified with Tzova.

The 19th-century Palestine Exploration Fund survey described the village of Suba as "undoubtedly an ancient Jewish site," noting rock-cut tombs and other remains around the hill.

=== Crusader period ===
In 1170, a Crusader fortress, Belmont, was built on Tel Tzova to guard the route to Jerusalem. Belmont was conquered by Saladin in 1191.

=== 1947–49 war ===
The Palestinian village of Suba, built on the ruins of Belmont Castle, was the scene of fierce fighting during the 1947–1949 Palestine war due to its strategic location overlooking the road to Jerusalem. In late 1947 and early 1948, irregular forces and militiamen stationed in Suba attacked Jewish traffic on the main highway from Tel Aviv to Jerusalem. The village was conquered by the Palmach during the night of July 12–13 as part of Operation Danny. Most of the inhabitants fled before the fighting, with the brigades involved in Operation Danny ordered to prevent their return. Most moved to Kalandia or Amman, Jordan, although some moved only 1 km away to the nearby village of Ein Rafa – where they and their descendants live to this day as Israeli citizens.

In October 1948 a group of Palmach veterans established kibbutz Misgav Palmach 1 km south of Suba, which was later renamed Palmach Tzova.

On 12 September 2025 a stabbing attack took place at a hotel in Tzova. Israeli police described it as a militant attack, in which a Palestinian employee stabbed two guests in the dining room.

== Economy ==
The kibbutz's main income comes from its glass factory: Oran Safety Glass (OSG), which produces laminated, tempered and bulletproof security glass. It was reported that OSG has begun "manufacturing a bullet-resistant windshield with a touch screen embedded in it" and that the product, called ScreeneX, "screen is connected to the vehicle's multimedia system, so it may be used to display maps, live feeds from the day or night vision cameras mounted on the vehicle, and other video options".

There is also a hotel overlooking the Jerusalem Hills, a children's amusement park ("Kiftzuba"), orchards, vineyards, a winery and a chocolate workshop. The kibbutz also hosts a residential Hebrew language ulpan. Other sources of income – located away from the kibbutz – are the dairy farm (located in kibbutz Tzora) and cotton fields. As the kibbutz is based on socialist principles, the salaries of kibbutz members who work independently in the city are automatically paid into the communal purse.

Kibbutz Tzova is the current location of URJ Heller High, the Union for Reform Judaism's study abroad high school in Israel.

== Archaeology ==
=== The "Cave of Saint John the Baptist" ===
In 1999, a cave believed to have been the cave of John the Baptist was discovered by Reuven Kalifon during archaeological excavations in the area of the kibbutz orchards, not far from Ein Karem, St. John's traditional birthplace.

In the 4th and 5th century CE, the cave was sanctified and used by Byzantine monks as a Christian holy place. On its walls are some of the earliest drawings known in local Christian art.

Structures outside the cave date to the Hellenistic period (2nd century BCE) and indicate that the cave was used as both a water reservoir and a place for bathing. Water was collected from the valley and channeled into the cave via a water-filtering basin. A sluice allowed some of the water to be channeled from the filtering basin into the fields.

Archaeologists discovered a flight of 7 steps leading to an underground, man-made rectangular pool of water. Thousands of pottery shards, possibly the remnants of small water jugs used in the baptismal ritual, were found at the site.

== Art ==
In the early 1970s Joseph Zaritsky, leader of the New Horizons group, established a studio in Tzova which he visited every year until his death in 1985, where he painted the landscapes of the area in his abstract painterly language.

In 1995 the artist Larry Abramson presented the exhibition "tsooba" at the kibbutz gallery. This series relates to Suba, a mound of ruins near Tzova. While Zaritsky ignored the Palestinian ruins found on the site and abstracted the landscape, Abramson painted the view realistically and then defaced it. By "seeing" the ruins of the Palestinian village, he criticized the Israeli point of view which seeks to erase the Palestinian identity from the appropriated territory.

In 2013 Jonathan Hirschfeld's series of paintings "On the Land" was presented at Mishkenot Sha'ananim in which he referred to Zaritsky's and Abramson's paintings of Tzova and the ethical and aesthetic discussion that arises in the meeting between the three generations of artists.

== See also ==
- Battle for Jerusalem (1948)
