= Al-Kum =

Village in West Bank, Palestine

al-Kum
- Municipality type D (Village council)

Arabic transcription(s)
  - Arabic: الكوم
  - Latin: al-Kum-al-Muwarraq-Beit Maqdum-Humsa (official)
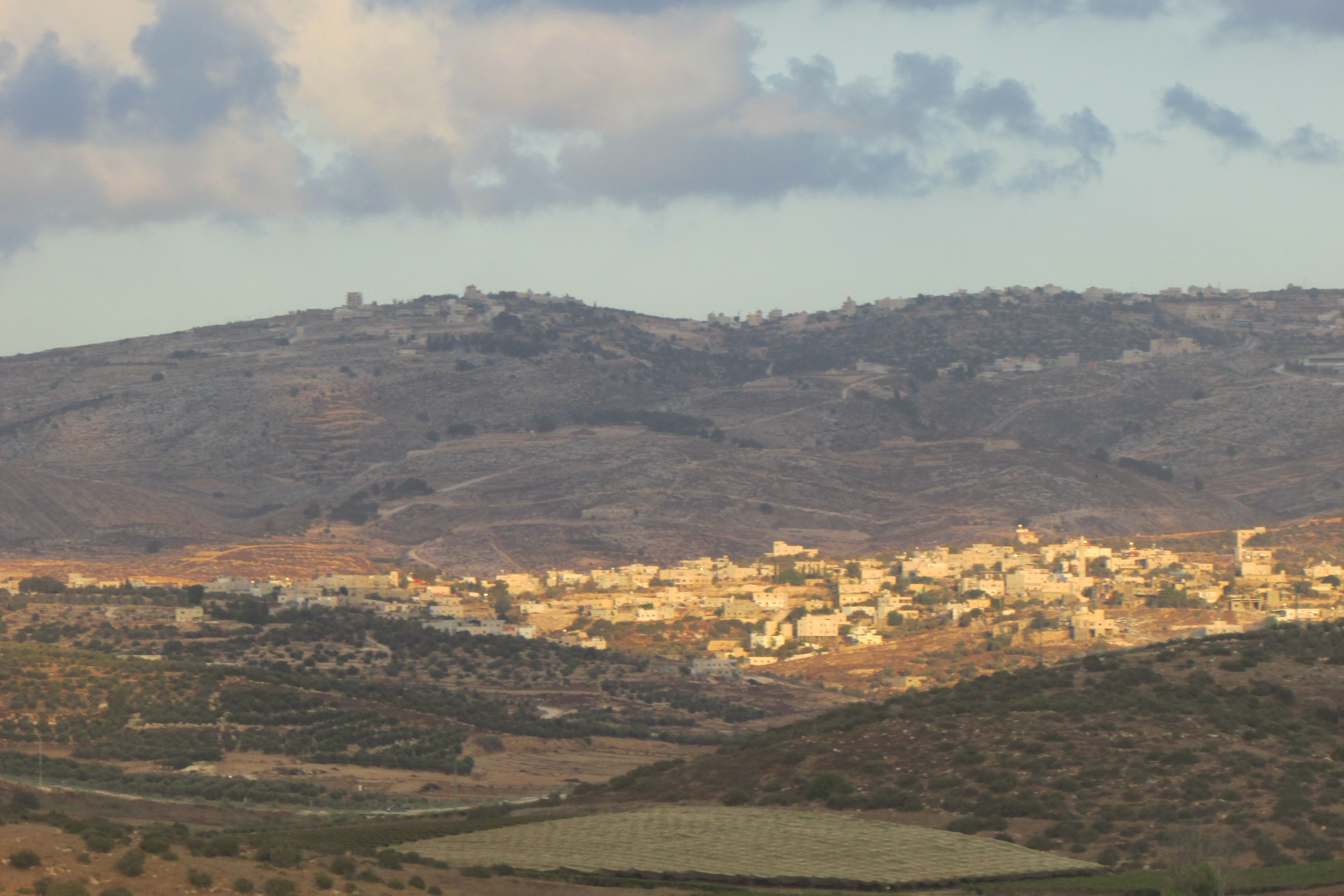

- Location of al-Kum within Palestine
- Coordinates: 31°31′53″N 34°57′38″E
- Palestine grid: 147/105
- State: State of Palestine
- Governorate: Hebron
- Founded: Early 19th-century

Government
  - Type: Village council (from 1996)
  - Head of Municipality: Musharraf Rajoub

Area
  - Total: 7.0 km^{2} (2.7 sq mi)

Population (2017)
  - Total: 1,464
  - Density: 210/km^{2} (540/sq mi)
- Name meaning: Kh. el Kôm: the ruin of heaps Kh. el Mûrak: the ruin the leafy place Beit Makdûm: the house of Makdûm, personal name

Al-Kum (Arabic: الكوم, romanized: al-Kūm, officially known as al-Kum-al-Muwarraq-Beit Maqdum-Humsa) is a Palestinian village in the southern West Bank, part of the Hebron Governorate and located 13 kilometers west of Hebron. Its municipal borders stretch from the border with Israel in the west to boundaries of the city of Dura in the east. It had a population of 1,464 in the 2017 census by the Palestinian Central Bureau of Statistics.

== Geography ==
From the east is Beit Maqdum, from the west is the Green Line (Israel), from the south is As Simiya, and from the north is Idna.

== History ==
=== Mamluk period ===
A Mamluk endowment record attests to Bayt Maqdum's inhabited status in 1262 CE.

=== Ottoman period ===
Early Ottoman tax registers in the 16th century have Bayt Makhdum/Bayt Maqdum located in the Nahiya of Halil of the Liwa of Quds. It was classified as Mazra'a (=cultivated) land.

In 1883, the PEF's Survey of Palestine found at Kh. el Kôm "traces of ruins and caves on a white hill-top." It further described it as "rather a large ruin." Khurbet el Murak was described as "caves and two large foundations", while at Beit Makdûm they noted "cisterns, caves, foundations, and walls, apparently an old site."

=== British Mandate era ===
At the time of the 1931 census of Palestine the populations of Kh. el Kum and Kh. Muraq were counted under Dura.

=== Jordanian era ===
After the 1948 Arab-Israeli War, the area was under Jordanian rule. The Jordanian census of 1961 found 247 inhabitants in Kaum and 150 in Muwarraq.

=== Post-1967 ===
After the 1967 Six-Day War, the Al-Kum area (together with the rest of the West Bank) has been under Israeli occupation.

The modern Al-Kum village was formed as a result of a 1995 merger between the villages of al-Kum, al-Muwarraq, Beit Maqdum and Humsa, with al-Kum being the largest and in the middle of the latter three. Al-Kum and Beit Maqdum were founded sometime in the early 19th century during Ottoman rule in Palestine. Most of the residents of the four villages were migrants from nearby Dura or Palestinian refugees who fled there following the 1948 Arab-Israeli War. The principal families are Rajoub, al-Awawda and al-Sharha. Following the founding of the modern village, a six-member village council was established to administer its affairs and provide some municipal services.

The primary health care facilities for the village are at al-Kum designated by the Ministry of Health as level 1. Close by is Deir Sammit where the primary healthcare facilities are at level 2.

== Bibliography ==
- Conder, C.R.; Kitchener, H.H. (1883). The Survey of Western Palestine: Memoirs of the Topography, Orography, Hydrography, and Archaeology. Vol. 3. London: Committee of the Palestine Exploration Fund.
- Government of Jordan, Department of Statistics (1964). First Census of Population and Housing. Volume I: Final Tables; General Characteristics of the Population (PDF).
- Mills, E., ed. (1932). Census of Palestine 1931. Population of Villages, Towns and Administrative Areas. Jerusalem: Government of Palestine.
- Palmer, E.H. (1881). The Survey of Western Palestine: Arabic and English Name Lists Collected During the Survey by Lieutenants Conder and Kitchener, R. E. Transliterated and Explained by E.H. Palmer. Committee of the Palestine Exploration Fund.
- Toledano, E. (1984). "The Sanjaq of Jerusalem in the Sixteenth Century: Aspects of Topography and Population". Archivum Ottomanicum. 9: 279–319. Archived from the original on 2016-03-05.
