= Fuqeiqis =

Village in Hebron Governorate, Palestine

Fuqeiqis Arabic: فقيقيس
- Fuqeiqis
- Location of Fuqeiqis within Palestine
- Country: Palestine
- Governorate: Hebron Governorate
- Elevation: 726 m (2,382 ft)

Population (2007)
  - Total: 271

Fuqeiqis is a Palestinian village located southwest of Dura, in the Hebron Governorate of the southern West Bank.

== Geography ==
Fuqeiqis is situated at an elevation of approximately 726 meters above sea level. The village is administered by a local village council, which also oversees the nearby villages of Khirbet Salama and Wadi Ubeid.

== Population ==
According to the Palestinian Central Bureau of Statistics, the population of Fuqeiqis was approximately 271 in 2007.

== See also ==
- Dura, Hebron
- Hebron Governorate
