= Khirbet Salama, Hebron =

Village in Hebron Governorate, Palestine

Khirbet Salama Arabic: خربة سلامة
- Khirbet Salama, Hebron
- Country: Palestine
- Governorate: Hebron Governorate
- Elevation: 726 m (2,382 ft)

Population (2007)
  - Total: 371

Khirbet Salama is a Palestinian village located west of the city of Dura, Hebron in the Hebron Governorate, in the southern West Bank.

== Population ==
In 2007, its population was approximately 371, according to the Palestinian Central Bureau of Statistics.

== Geography ==
Its elevation is approximately 726 meters above sea level. It is bordered to the north by the lands of At-Tabaqa, to the east by Khursa, to the south as-Sura, and to the west by Fuqeiqis.

== See also ==
- Dura, Hebron
- Hebron Governorate
