= Suba, Jerusalem =

Suba صوبا Soba, Sobetha, Zova
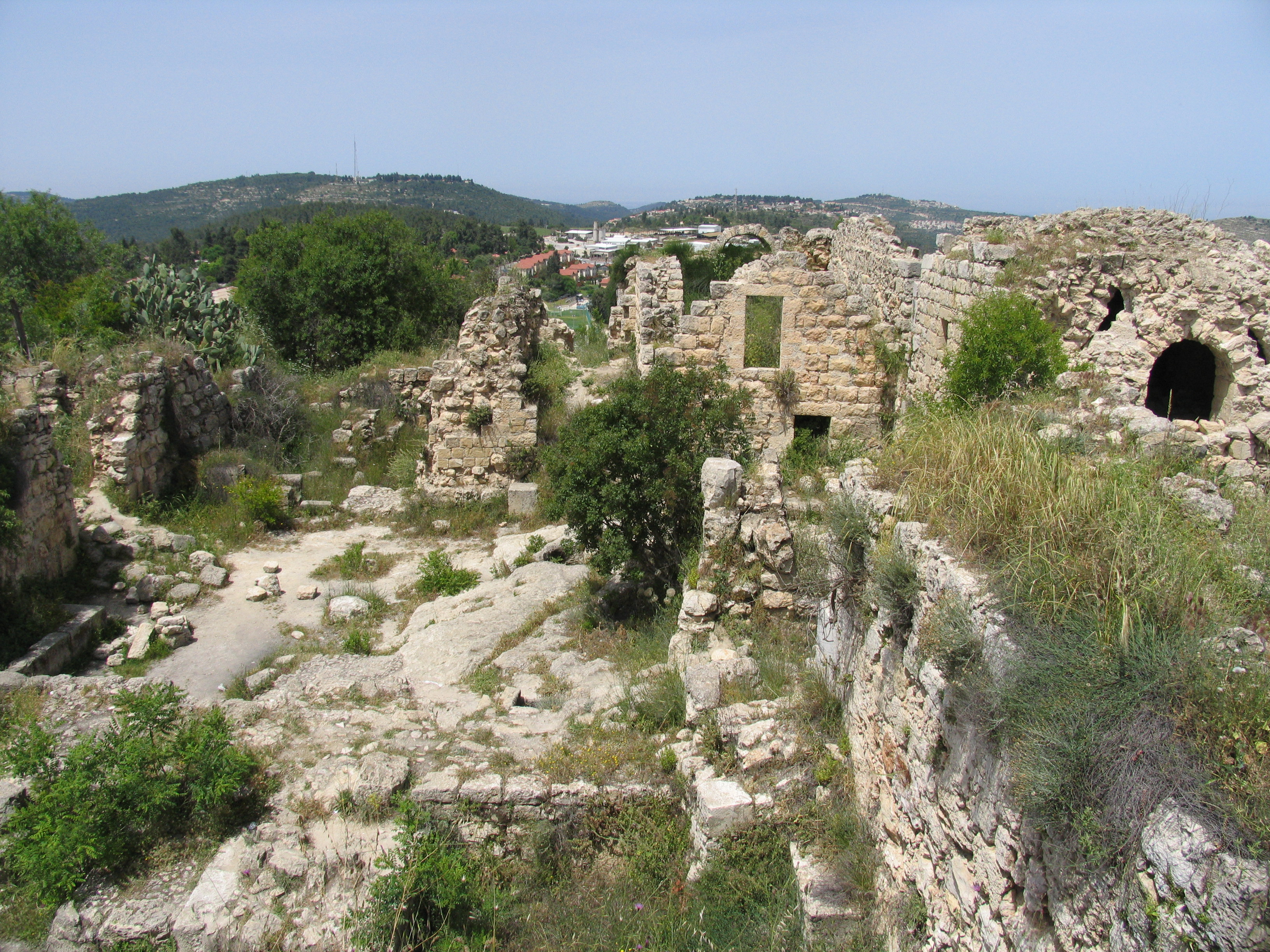
- Remains of the Suba village square and surrounding buildings, formerly the Belmont Castle courtyard
- Etymology: The heap
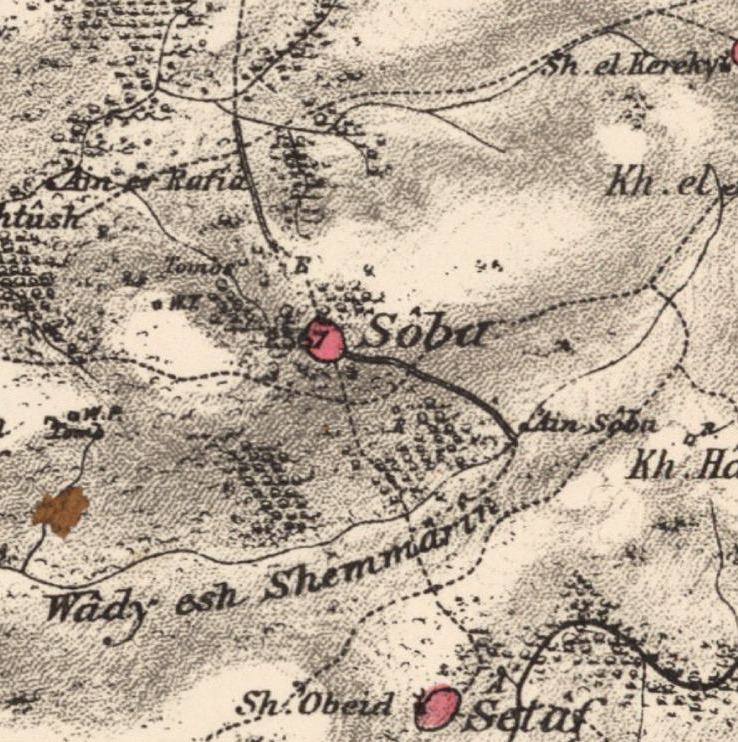
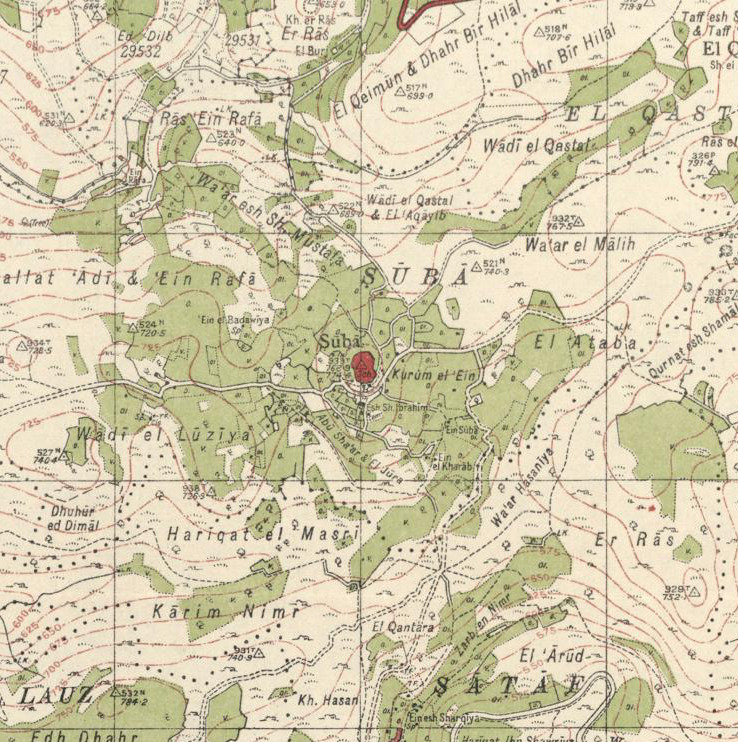
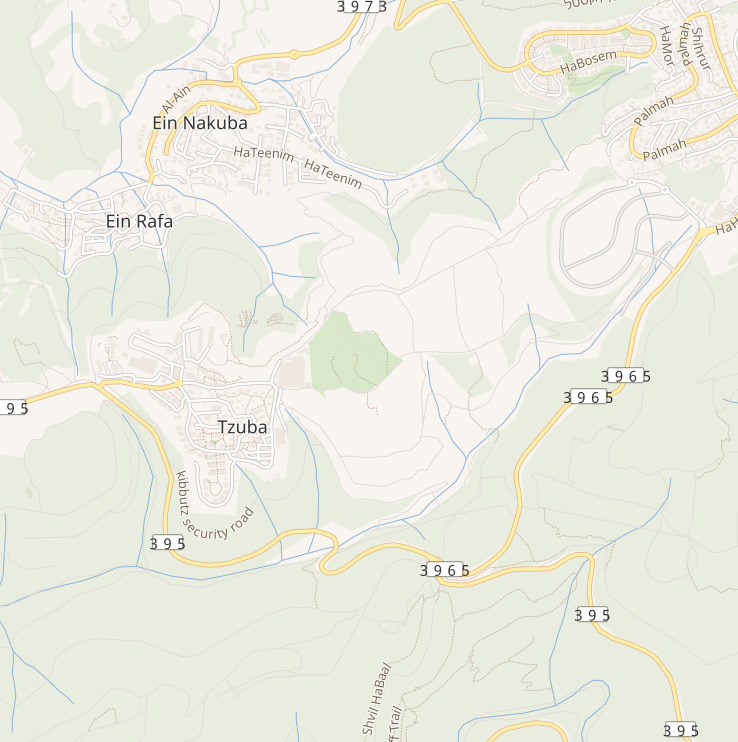
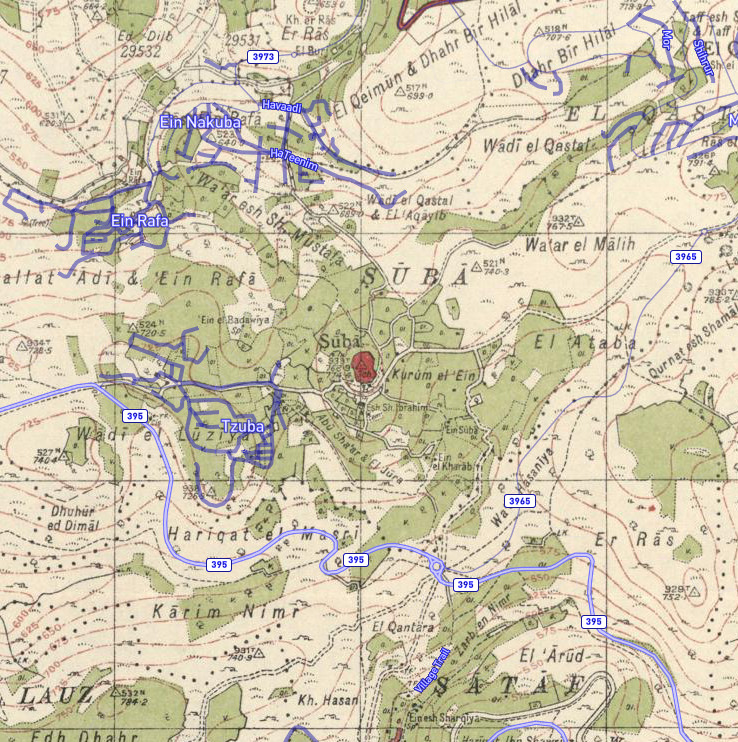
- 1870s map 1940s map modern map 1940s with modern overlay map A series of historical maps of the area around Suba, Jerusalem (click the buttons)

- Location within Mandatory Palestine
- Coordinates: 31°47′5″N 35°7′34″E
- Palestine grid: 162/132
- Geopolitical entity: Mandatory Palestine
- Subdistrict: Jerusalem
- Date of depopulation: 13 July 1948

Area
  - Total: 4,102 dunams (4.102 km^{2}; 1.584 sq mi)

Population (1945)
  - Total: 620
- Cause(s) of depopulation: Military assault by Yishuv forces
- Current Localities: Tzova

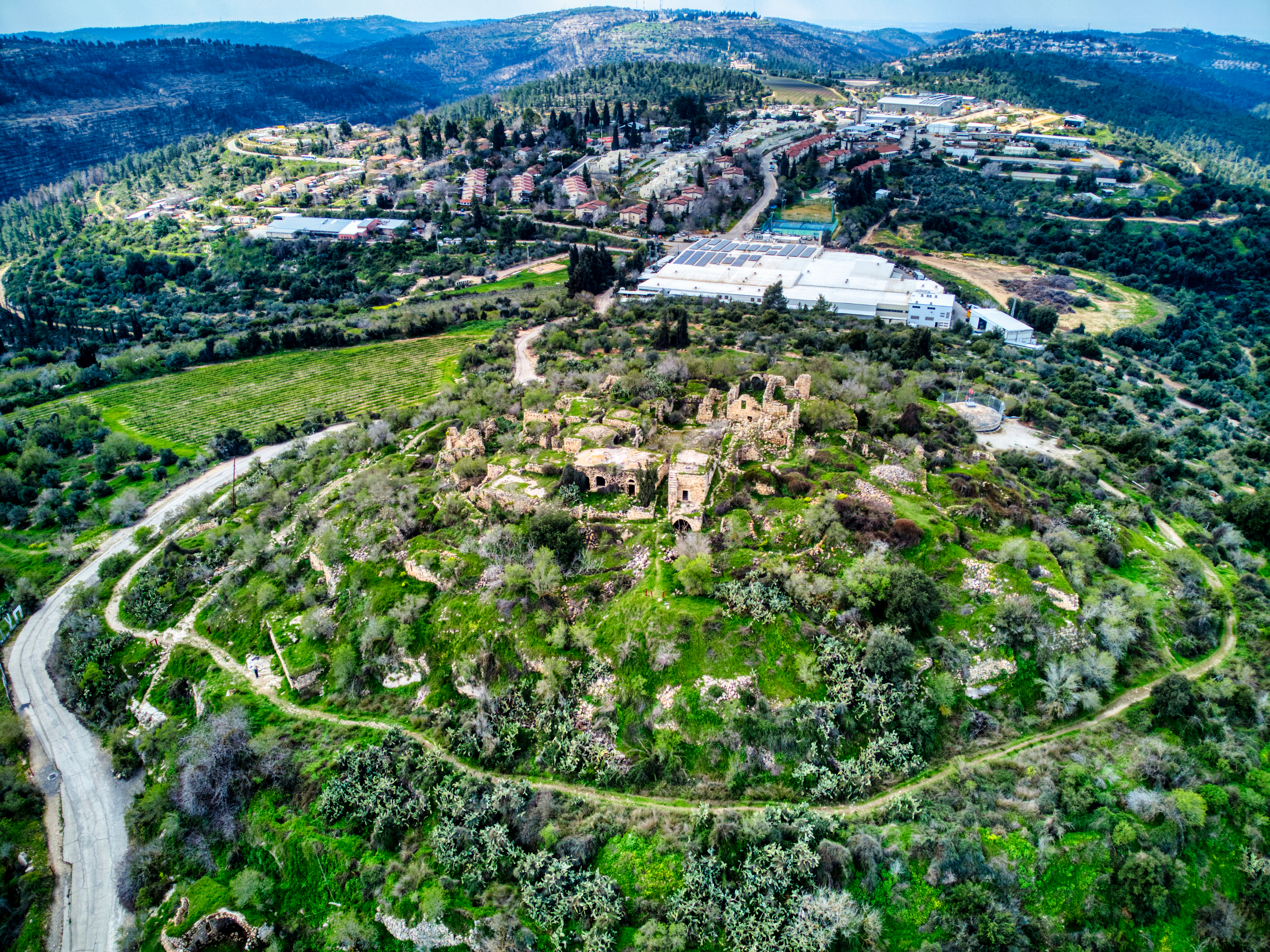
The Belmont hill and on it the remains of Suba village and the castle. In the background - Kibbutz Tzova

Suba (Arabic: صوبا, romanized: Ṣūbā) was a Palestinian Arab village west of Jerusalem that was depopulated and destroyed in 1948. The site of the village lies on the summit of a conical hill called Tel Tzova (Hebrew: תל צובה), or Jabal Suba, rising 769 meters above sea level, and it was built on the ruins of a Crusader castle.

== Biblical reference ==
The place has been tentatively identified with a town mentioned in the Septuagint version of Joshua 15:59. The Septuagint gives a list of eleven towns, which is missing in the Masoretic text. One of them is given as Σωρης ('Sōrēs') in most manuscripts but as Εωβης ("Eobes") in the Codex Vaticanus. The original therefore might have been Σωβης ("Sōbes"). There has also been a tentative identification with Tzova or Zobah (Greek Σουβα, "Sūba") from the Books of Samuel (1 Samuel 14:47 and 2 Samuel 23:36), but others consider the identification to be unfounded.

== History ==
=== Antiquity ===
Middle Bronze Age cairn-tombs were excavated in the neighborhood of the ruined Arab village, though the site itself has not yielded artifacts from before the late Iron Age.

March 2000 excavations at a plastered cave on the grounds of Kibbutz Tzova identified it as the cave of John the Baptist.

In the later Roman period, the site was possibly mentioned in rabbinical sources as Seboim.

=== Crusader era ===
It has been suggested that Suba was Subahiet, one of 21 villages given by King Godfrey as a fief to the Church of the Holy Sepulchre. In 1114, the gift was re-confirmed by Baldwin I of Jerusalem.

A "Brother William of Belmont" was mentioned in Crusader sources in the years 1157 and 1162, he might have been castellan at Belmont.

Sometime before 1169, the Crusaders built a castle there called Belmont, run by the Hospitallers. In 1170 an unnamed castellan was mentioned. Today, parts of the northern and western Crusader wall remain, as well as ruins of a tower and other structures. These include large underground cisterns, some pre-dating the Crusader period.

Belmont Castle was taken by Saladin in 1187. According to the chronicles it was destroyed by him in 1191 but no trace of the destruction was located during the archaeological investigation.

Settlement at the site continued, and it was mentioned as "Suba", a village of Jerusalem, about 1225 by Yakut.

Belmont castle was excavated by archaeologists in 1986–9.

=== Ottoman era ===
Suba, like the rest of Palestine, was incorporated into the Ottoman Empire in 1517, and in the tax registers of 1596, there were 60 Muslim and 7 Christian families living there; an estimated 369 persons. They paid a fixed tax-rate of 33.3% on agricultural products, including wheat, barley, olives and grapes; a total of 3,800 akçe. In the 1500s, Suba villagers also paid taxes for the cultivation of the land of Deir Sammit.

In the 17th century, Christian villagers of the Greek Orthodox denomination in Ṣūbā converted to Islam, as documented in records from the Islamic court of Jerusalem. These conversions are believed to have been influenced by economic challenges.

In 1838 Suba was noted as a Muslim village, located in the Beni Malik district, west of Jerusalem.

In the mid-nineteenth century, the village was controlled by the Abu Ghosh family. The Crusader walls and the fortifications they built in the village were destroyed by Ibrahim Pasha in 1834.

The French explorer Victor Guérin visited the village on 30 April 1863, and noted: "This mountain, isolated and cone-shaped, was crowned at its summit by a small town, now reduced to the state of a simple village, which is still called Souba. Before Ibrahim Pasha's invasion, it was a stronghold, surrounded by old walls perfectly built with magnificent, well-fitted blocks; but in 1834, after fairly stiff resistance, it was stormed by Ibrahim and almost completely dismantled. Nevertheless, there still remain, in several places, entire sections of walls almost intact, showing, by the regularity and large size of their courses, the beauty of the enclosure that surrounded this town".

An Ottoman village list of about 1870 showed that Suba had 33 houses and a population of 112, though the population count included only men.

In 1896 the population of Suba was estimated to be about 360 persons.

=== British Mandate era ===
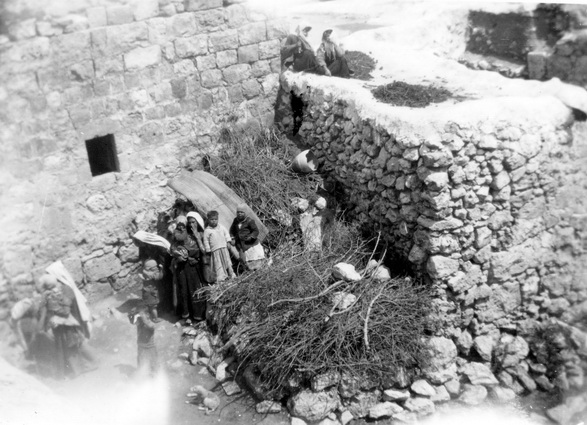
Suba residents, 1935

In the 1922 census of Palestine conducted by the British Mandate authorities, Suba had a population 307, all Muslims, increasing in the 1931 census (when it was counted with Dayr 'Amr) to 434 Muslims, in 110 houses.

In the 1945 statistics the population of Suba was 620, all Muslims, who owned 4,082 dunams of land according to an official land and population survey. 1,435 dunams were plantations and irrigable land, 712 for cereals, while 16 dunams were built-up (urban) land.

=== State of Israel ===
During the 1948 Arab-Israeli War, the village saw fierce fighting, due to its key location near the Jerusalem highway. In late 1947 and early 1948, irregular forces of the Egyptian Muslim Brotherhood stationed in Suba took part in the fighting against Jewish forces, including attacks on Jewish traffic on the Tel Aviv-Jerusalem Road. The village was attacked several times by the Haganah, and finally conquered by the Palmach during the night of July 12–13 as part of Operation Danny. Most of the inhabitants had fled during the fighting, and those who remained were expelled. In October 1948, the "Ameilim" group of Palmach veterans established a kibbutz called Misgav Palmach on village lands 1 km to the south. Later it was renamed Tzova.

Today Tel Tzova is a national park surrounded by the lands of the kibbutz. The ruins of the village are visible along with remains of Belmont Castle.

By 2011, the history of the village of Suba has been the subject of two books; one by Ibrahim ‘Awadallah published in Amman, Jordan in 1996, and another by Muhammad Sa’id Muslih Rumman in the West Bank, published in 2000.

=== Gallery ===
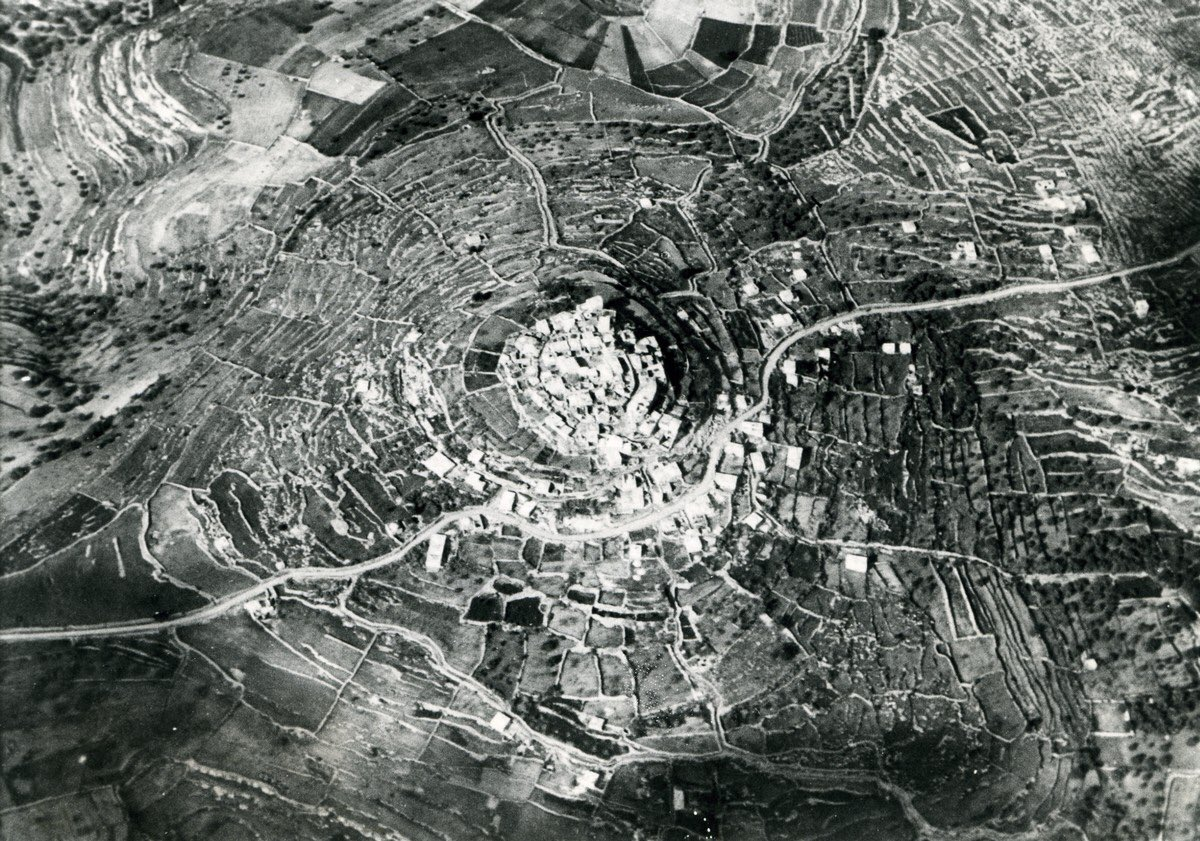
Suba, Jerusalem 1947 from Palmach archive

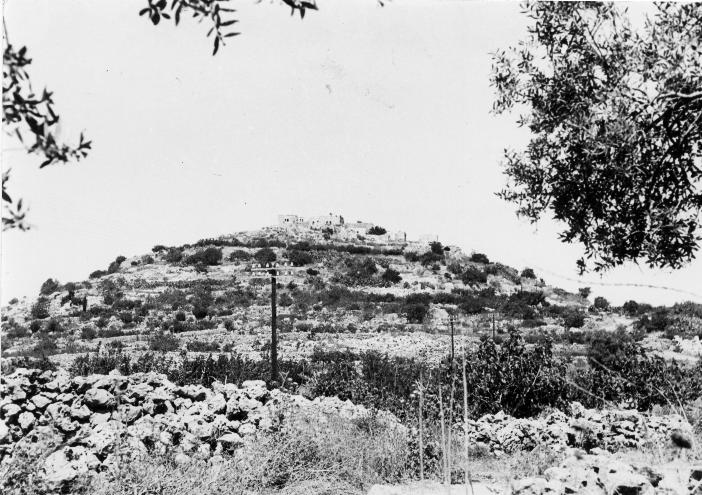
View of Suba 1948

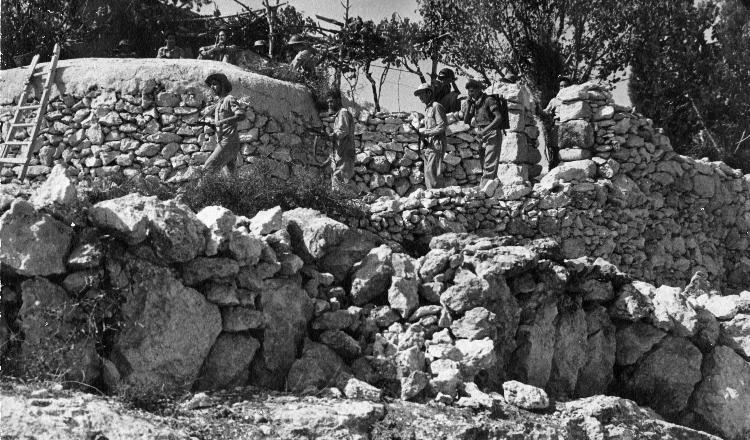
Soldiers from the Harel Brigade in Suba, 1948

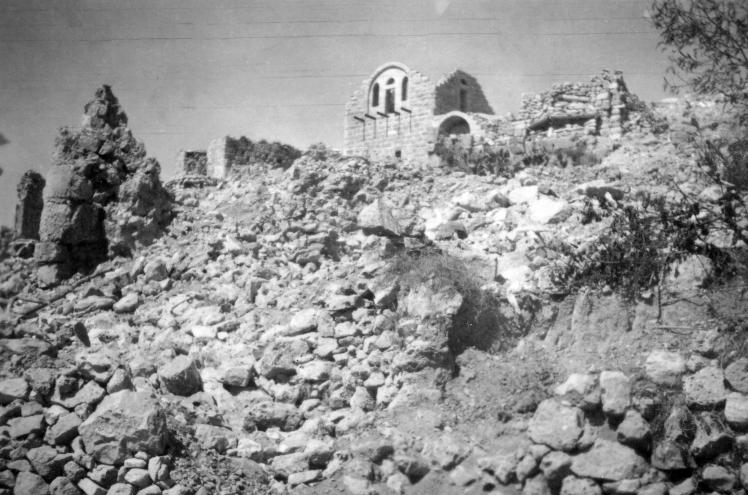
Suba, October 1948, after demolition had started

== Bibliography ==
- Ambroise (1897). L'estoire de la guerre sainte: histoire en vers de la troisième croisade (1190-1192) (in Old French). Vol. 11. Paris: Imprimerie nationale.
- ‘Awadallah, Ibrahim. 1996. Suba: Ihda qura Filastin al-mudammara [Suba: One of Palestine’s destroyed villages], 2nd ed. Jordan: Jam‘iyyat Suba al-Ta‘awuniyya.
- Barron, J.B., ed. (1923). Palestine: Report and General Abstracts of the Census of 1922. Government of Palestine.
- Conder, C.R.; Kitchener, H.H. (1883). The Survey of Western Palestine: Memoirs of the Topography, Orography, Hydrography, and Archaeology. Vol. 3. London: Committee of the Palestine Exploration Fund.
- Conder, C.R. (1890). "Norman Palestine". Quarterly Statement - Palestine Exploration Fund. 22: 29–37. doi:10.1179/peq.1890.22.1.29.
- Clermont-Ganneau, C.S. (1899). [ARP] Archaeological Researches in Palestine 1873-1874, translated from the French by J. McFarlane. Vol. 1. London: Palestine Exploration Fund. p. 480-481
- Davis, Rochelle (2004). "Peasant Narratives Memorial Book Sources for Jerusalem Village History". Jerusalem Quarterly (20): 62–72. doi:10.70190/jq.I20.p62.
- Davis, Rochelle (2011). Palestinian Village Histories: Geographies of the Displaced. Stanford: Stanford University Press. ISBN 978-0-8047-7313-3.
- Dauphin, C. (1998). La Palestine byzantine, Peuplement et Populations. BAR International Series 726 (in French). Vol. III : Catalogue. Oxford: Archeopress. ISBN 0-860549-05-4. (p. 902)
- Government of Palestine, Department of Statistics (1945). Village Statistics, April, 1945.
- Guérin, V. (1868). Description Géographique Historique et Archéologique de la Palestine (in French). Vol. 1: Judee, pt. 1. Paris: L'Imprimerie Nationale.
- Hadawi, S. (1970). Village Statistics of 1945: A Classification of Land and Area ownership in Palestine. Palestine Liberation Organization Research Center.
- Harper, R.P.; Pringle, D. (2000). Belmont Castle, The excavation of a Crusader Stronghold in the Kingdom of Jerusalem. Oxford University Press. ISBN 0-19-727009-3.
- Hartmann, M. (1883). "Die Ortschaftenliste des Liwa Jerusalem in dem türkischen Staatskalender für Syrien auf das Jahr 1288 der Flucht (1871)". Zeitschrift des Deutschen Palästina-Vereins. 6: 102–149.
- Hütteroth, W.-D.; Abdulfattah, K. (1977). Historical Geography of Palestine, Transjordan and Southern Syria in the Late 16th Century. Erlanger Geographische Arbeiten, Sonderband 5. Erlangen, Germany: Vorstand der Fränkischen Geographischen Gesellschaft. ISBN 3-920405-41-2.
- Khalidi, W. (1992). All That Remains: The Palestinian Villages Occupied and Depopulated by Israel in 1948. Washington D.C.: Institute for Palestine Studies. ISBN 0-88728-224-5.
- Le Strange, G. (1890). Palestine Under the Moslems: A Description of Syria and the Holy Land from A.D. 650 to 1500. Committee of the Palestine Exploration Fund.
- McCown, C. (1921). "Muslim Shrines in Palestine". Annual of the American Schools of Oriental Research. 2–3: 47–79. (p. 55 p. 76: Plate 15)
- Mills, E., ed. (1932). Census of Palestine 1931. Population of Villages, Towns and Administrative Areas. Jerusalem: Government of Palestine.
- Morris, B. (2004). The Birth of the Palestinian Refugee Problem Revisited. Cambridge University Press. ISBN 978-0-521-00967-6.
- Palmer, E.H. (1881). The Survey of Western Palestine: Arabic and English Name Lists Collected During the Survey by Lieutenants Conder and Kitchener, R. E. Transliterated and Explained by E.H. Palmer. Committee of the Palestine Exploration Fund.
- Pringle, D. (1997). Secular buildings in the Crusader Kingdom of Jerusalem: an archaeological Gazetter. Cambridge University Press. ISBN 0521-46010-7.
- Pringle, D. (1998). The Churches of the Crusader Kingdom of Jerusalem: L-Z (excluding Tyre). Vol. II. Cambridge University Press. ISBN 0-521-39037-0.
- Robinson, E.; Smith, E. (1841). Biblical Researches in Palestine, Mount Sinai and Arabia Petraea: A Journal of Travels in the year 1838. Vol. 2. Boston: Crocker & Brewster.
- Robinson, E.; Smith, E. (1841). Biblical Researches in Palestine, Mount Sinai and Arabia Petraea: A Journal of Travels in the year 1838. Vol. 3. Boston: Crocker & Brewster.
- RHC Or: Recueil des historiens des croisades : Historiens orientaux (in French). Vol. 4. Paris: Imprimerie nationale. 1898.
- Röhricht, R. (1893). (RRH) Regesta regni Hierosolymitani (MXCVII-MCCXCI) (in Latin). Berlin: Libraria Academica Wageriana.
- Röhricht, R. (1904). (RRH Ad) Regesta regni Hierosolymitani Additamentum (in Latin). Berlin: Libraria Academica Wageriana.
- de Roziére, E., ed. (1849). Cartulaire de l'église du Saint Sépulchre de Jérusalem: publié d'après les manuscrits du Vatican (in Latin and French). Paris: Imprimerie nationale.
- Rumman, Muhammad Sa‘id Muslih. 2000. Suba: Qarya maqdisiyya fi al-dhakira [Suba:A Jerusalem village in memory]. Jerusalem, West Bank: n.p.
- Schick, C. (1896). "Zur Einwohnerzahl des Bezirks Jerusalem". Zeitschrift des Deutschen Palästina-Vereins. 19: 120–127.
- Socin, A. (1879). "Alphabetisches Verzeichniss von Ortschaften des Paschalik Jerusalem". Zeitschrift des Deutschen Palästina-Vereins. 2: 135–163.
- Toledano, E. (1984). "The Sanjaq of Jerusalem in the Sixteenth Century: Aspects of Topography and Population". Archivum Ottomanicum. 9: 279–319.
