= 2026 Beit Awwa salon strike =

2026 Iran war airstrike

- Part of the 2026 Iran war
- A CCTV footage of the incident. The record shows the time 22:10 local time at its beginning. The footage was later verified and used by Sky News.
- Location: Beit Awwa, Palestine
- Date: 18 March 2026
- Attack type: Strike
- Deaths: 4 civilians (6 when including unborn children)
- Injuries: 13
- Victims: Mais Ghazi Masalmeh, Sahira Rizq Masalmeh, Amal Sobhi Abdel Karim Matawa’ Masalmeh and Asil Samir Masalmeh
- Accused: Iran (per Israel); Israel (per Palestine)

On 18 March 2026, during a broader exchange of missile attacks in the 2026 Iran war, a missile struck a location next to a beauty salon in the town of Beit Awwa in the West Bank, near Hebron. The strike killed four Palestinian women and injured more than a dozen others. The incident was the first time a missile struck a territory controlled by the Palestinian Authority during the war.

Whilst the Palestinian Authority have stated it was "likely" an errant Israeli interceptor, multiple international media outlets have confirmed that the missile originated from Iran.

== Background ==
=== Start of the 2026 Iran War ===
The strike took place amid escalating hostilities between Iran, Israel, and the United States, which began on 28 February 2026 following coordinated U.S–Israeli strikes on Iranian targets and their allies within the Axis of Resistance. Iran responded with large-scale missile barrages directed towards Israel, U.S. bases and their allies in the Persian Gulf and other areas of the globe, mostly within Western Asia.

During the conflict Palestinians were also affected by the war indirectly, with most consequences deriving from the attitude of the State of Israel. The Israeli Coordinator of Government Activities in the Territories closed multiple aid crossings in the Gaza Strip, Israeli forces suspended United Nations humanitarian movements and postponed planned rotations of international humanitarian staff, blocked various roads in the West Bank (thus causing harder accessibility to medications for Palestinians living within it) and Israeli settler violence against Palestinians in occupied West Bank had overall increased. However, the incident was the first time a bellicose object had struck the West Bank, and a territory controlled by the Palestinian Authority, directly during the conflict.

=== Context of the strike ===
The salon was not in an established building, however, it was in a makeshift caravan/trailer (as described by different sources) run by the sisters-in-law Masalmeh extended family and described as a "hopeful project" in dire economic conditions. One of the victims was one of the co-owners.

The people within the beauty salon were mostly getting their eyelashes and nails done in preparation for the Islamic holiday of Eid al-Fitr.

== Strike ==
Moments before the impact, people outside the salon noticed a flash of light in the sky. A group of women were gathered on steps nearby waiting for their turn to get their nails done. Upon hearing an explosion, members of the Masalmeh family rushed to the salon.

Initially, three victims were identified by local authorities based on witness testimonies: 17-year-old Mais Ghazi Masalmeh, 50-year-old Sahira Rizq Masalmeh, and 36-year-old Amal Sobhi Abdel Karim Matawa’ Masalmeh. Another casualty was Asil Samir Masalmeh, who died from her injuries the following day. Two of the women were pregnant. Thirteen other individuals were injured according to local authorities.

== Aftermath ==
Shortly after the strike, Palestinian Civil Defence and medics arrived and treated the wounded, secured the area, and warned residents to avoid possible unexploded debris. The Palestinian Health Ministry later reported that some of the injured people underwent amputations and surgery following the incident. The Palestine Red Crescent Society stated that they had difficulties reaching the site of the explosion due to the presence of multiple barriers, including iron gates.

The local community mobilized alongside relatives of the deceased in order to mourn their death. The women were given a military funeral in Hebron, which began at Dora Government Hospital. Hebron Governor Khaled Dudin and other senior security officials attended, and the military bestowed martyrdom honors upon them. Thousands of people attended the funeral.

== Reactions ==
=== Palestinian reaction ===
Palestinian Authority officials blamed an errant Israeli interceptor, however subsequent reporting stated that Palestinian authorities could not confirm whether the debris came from an Iranian missile or an Israeli interceptor.

=== Israeli reaction ===
Israeli authorities commented that the event was most likely caused by an Iranian cluster munition. Israeli reports also stated that damages, but no injuries, were reported in the Israeli community of Neta and Asa'el, claiming it was from the same cluster munition. Israeli president Isaac Herzog visited the site of the impact. Upon offering his condolences, he said that "Iranian missiles do not differentiate between Muslim and Christian and Jew and whichever religion, they're out there to kill anybody because they feel everybody who doesn't accept their belief is an infidel."

=== International reaction ===
Following the incident, UAE foreign affairs minister Abdullah bin Zayed Al Nahyan strongly condemned the strike, calling it an "unprovoked, terrorist Iranian missile attack" during a call with the vice president of the Palestinian Authority, Hussein al-Sheikh.

== Analysis ==
The Observer Post and testimonies interviewed by Sky News pointed out how those living within the boundaries of the Palestinian Authority, unlike those living within Israel, have very limited protection during such attacks and often have to rely to sirens from nearby Israeli settlements or cities to get a warning of incoming missiles, giving little time for evacuations.

The Yesha Council issued a statement accusing Arab outlets in the West Bank of spreading "falsehood" due to some local reportage blaming Israel for the event, stating the event was being used for anti-Israeli sensationalism.
