= As Simiya =

Village in Hebron Governorate, Palestine

As Simiya السيمياء
- Municipality type D (Village council)
- السيمياء (Arabic)
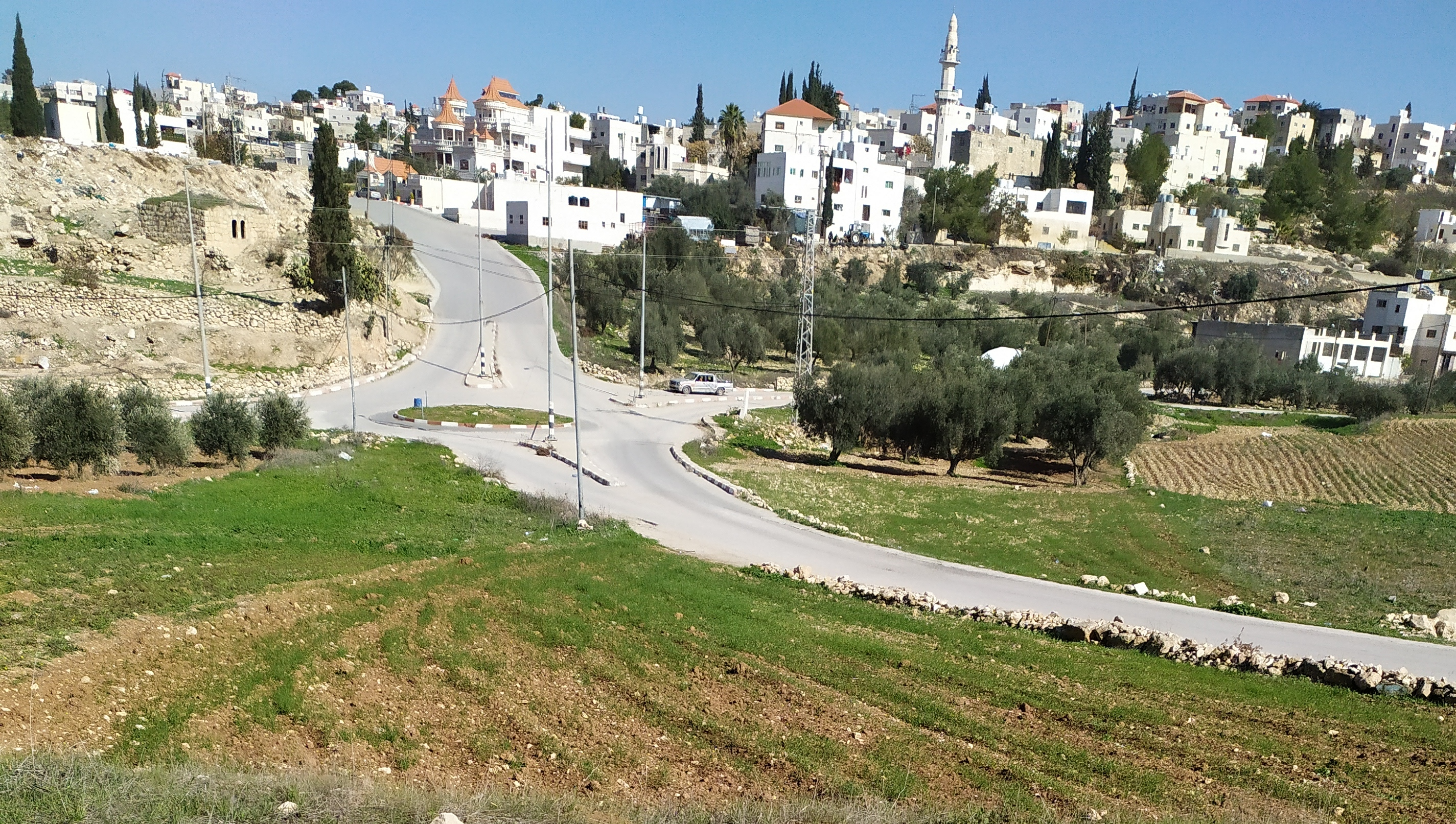
- As Simiya village, west of Dura city

- Location within State of Palestine
- Coordinates: 31°31′26″N 34°58′08″E
- Country: Palestine
- Governorate: Hebron Governorate

Government
  - Type: Village council (from 1978)
- Elevation: 460 m (1,510 ft)

Population (1997)
  - Total: 1,225
- Name meaning خربة سمية: Khurbet es Simieh, "The ruin of the mark or sign": Guérin, V.KHIRBET SiMIA (1869). Description Géographique Historique et Archéologique de la Palestine (in French). Vol. 1: Judee, pt. 2. Paris: L'Imprimerie.KHIRBET SiMIA Nationale.

As Simiya (Arabic: السيمياء) Simiya is a Palestinian village located 15 kilometers west of Dura in Hebron. The village is located in the Hebron Governorate in the southern West Bank. In 2018 Simiya and Deir Sammit had one municipal council.

== Geography and boundaries of the village ==
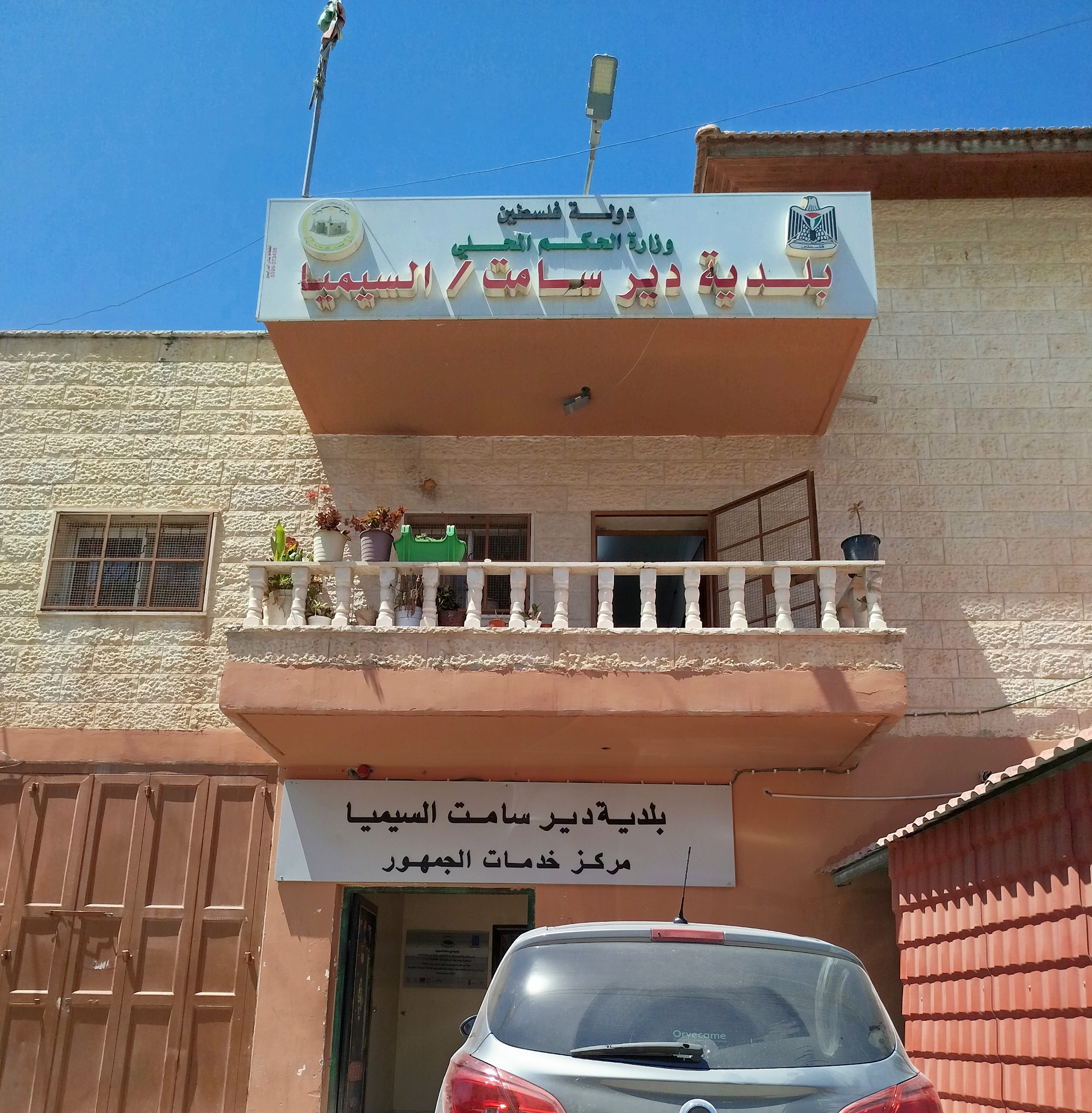
Dayr Samit And As Simiya Municipality

The village is located to the west of the city of Dura and within its lands (Natural Basin No. 22). The town of As Simiya is located at an altitude of 460 meters above sea level.

- From the south: Beit Awwa
- From the north: Al-Muwarraq
- From the east: Deir Sammit
- From the west: al-Kum

== Population ==
In 1961, the population of Khirbet Simiya or Khirbet Simia was 196. In the first Palestinian census in 1997, the population was 1,225.

== History ==
It includes village ruins, remnants of buildings, water cisterns, carved door lintels, and rock-cut tombs with columns.

=== Ottoman period ===
In tax records from the Ottoman empire, Khirbet Simia was mentioned as land cultivated by farmers in the area.

In 1838, it was registered as a place and ruin, part of the district of Hebron.

In 1863, Victor Guérin named the site Khirbet Simia.

=== British Mandate ===
It fell under the British Mandate for Palestine in 1922.

=== Jordanian rule ===
It fell under Jordanian administration after the 1948 war, as a result of the 1949 armistice agreements.

The Jordanian census of 1961 found 196 inhabitants in As Simiya, which it called Sumayyeh.

=== 1967 war ===
The village fell under Israeli occupation after the Six-Day War in 1967.

=== Palestinian authority ===
After the establishment of the Palestinian Authority in 1994, the village fell under its rule.

== Facilities and services ==
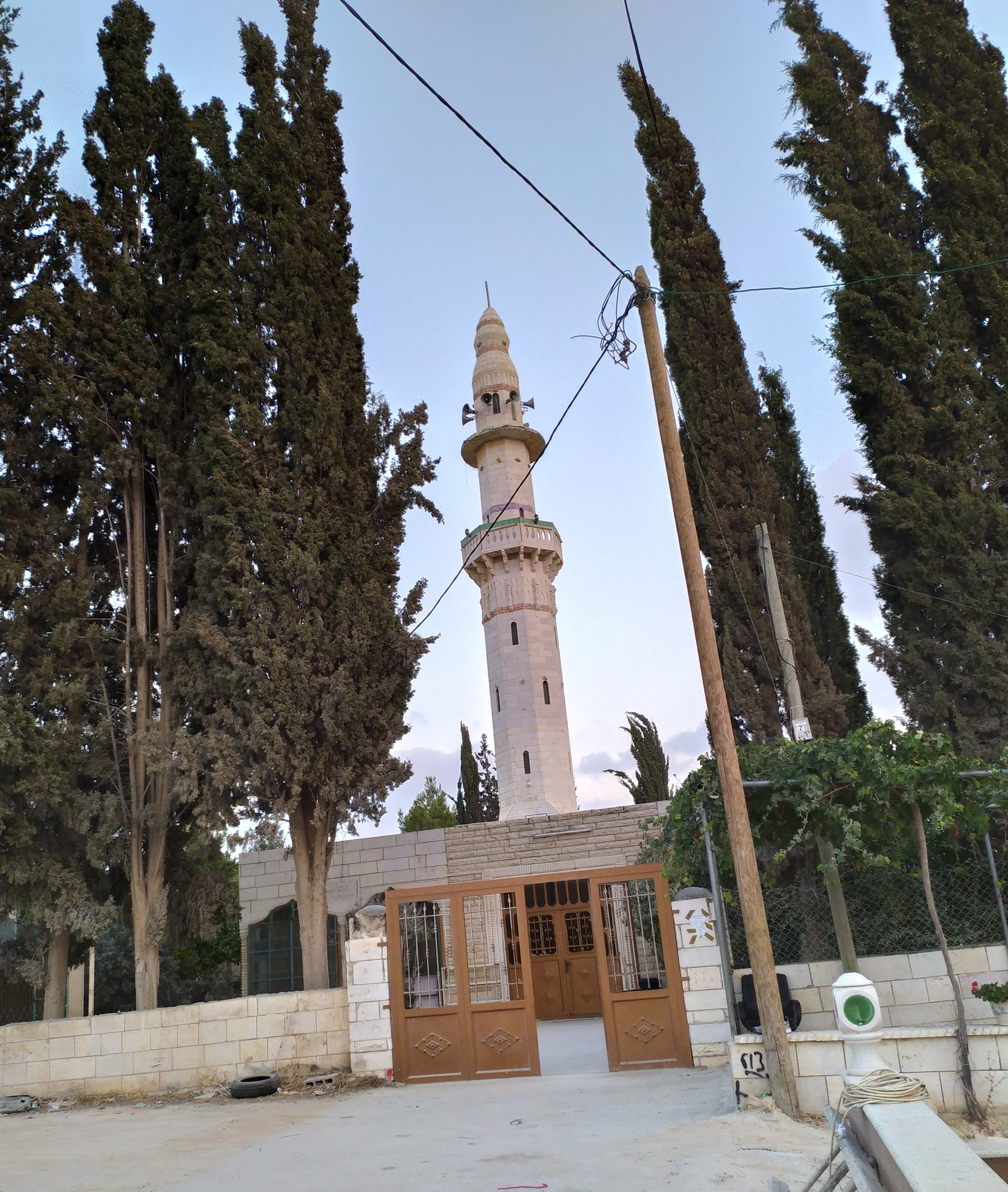
As Simiya Mosque, also known as the Mosque of Shurahbil bin Hasna

It includes an elementary school, a government health clinic, a Palestinian Red Crescent Society emergency center serving the Deir Sammit and Simiya areas, and a Simiya mosque. It was established in 1990 in the name of sahaba Shurahbil ibn Hasana.

== Water ==
In the village, there is a freshwater spring called Ain Nab' As Simiya or Bir Simiya (Biyara As Simiya).

== Antiquities ==
In 2000, all the old buildings, passages, caves, and historical and archaeological vaults were demolished to make way for a school construction project. Only a few of the old village buildings remain.

== See also ==
- Dura, Hebron
- Hebron Governorate

== Gallery ==
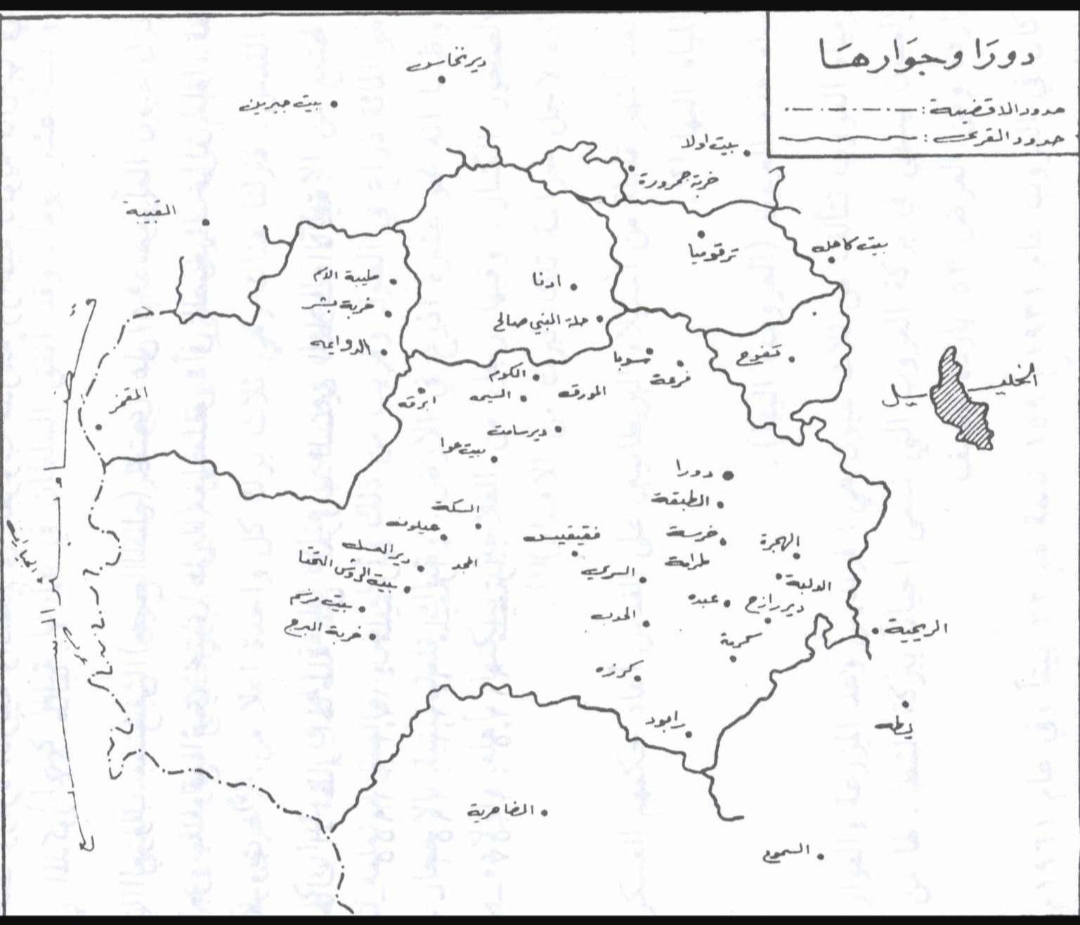
Khirbet Al-Simiya in Dura, Hebron

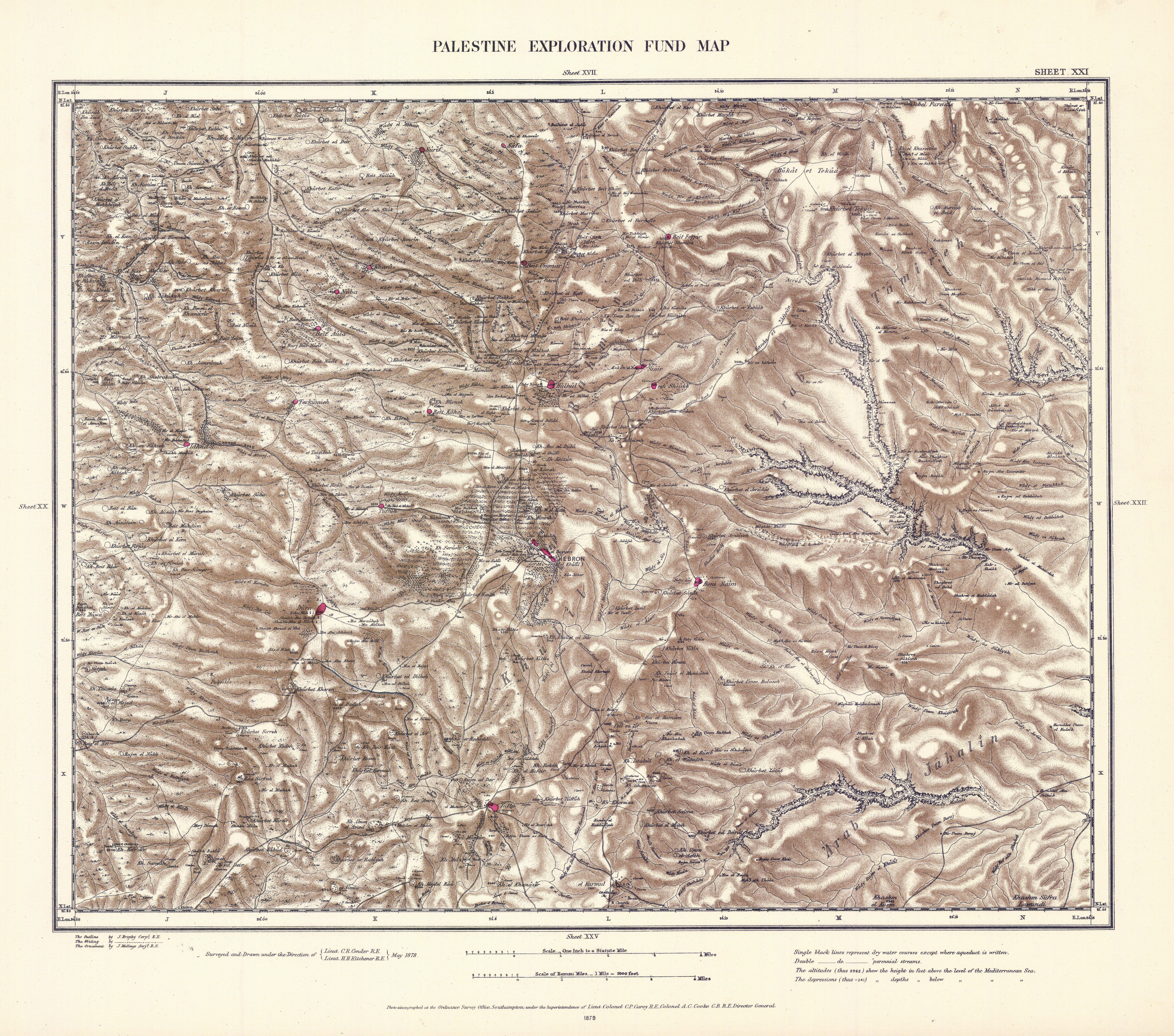
Khirbat es Simieh، File:Survey of Western Palestine 1880.21.jpg

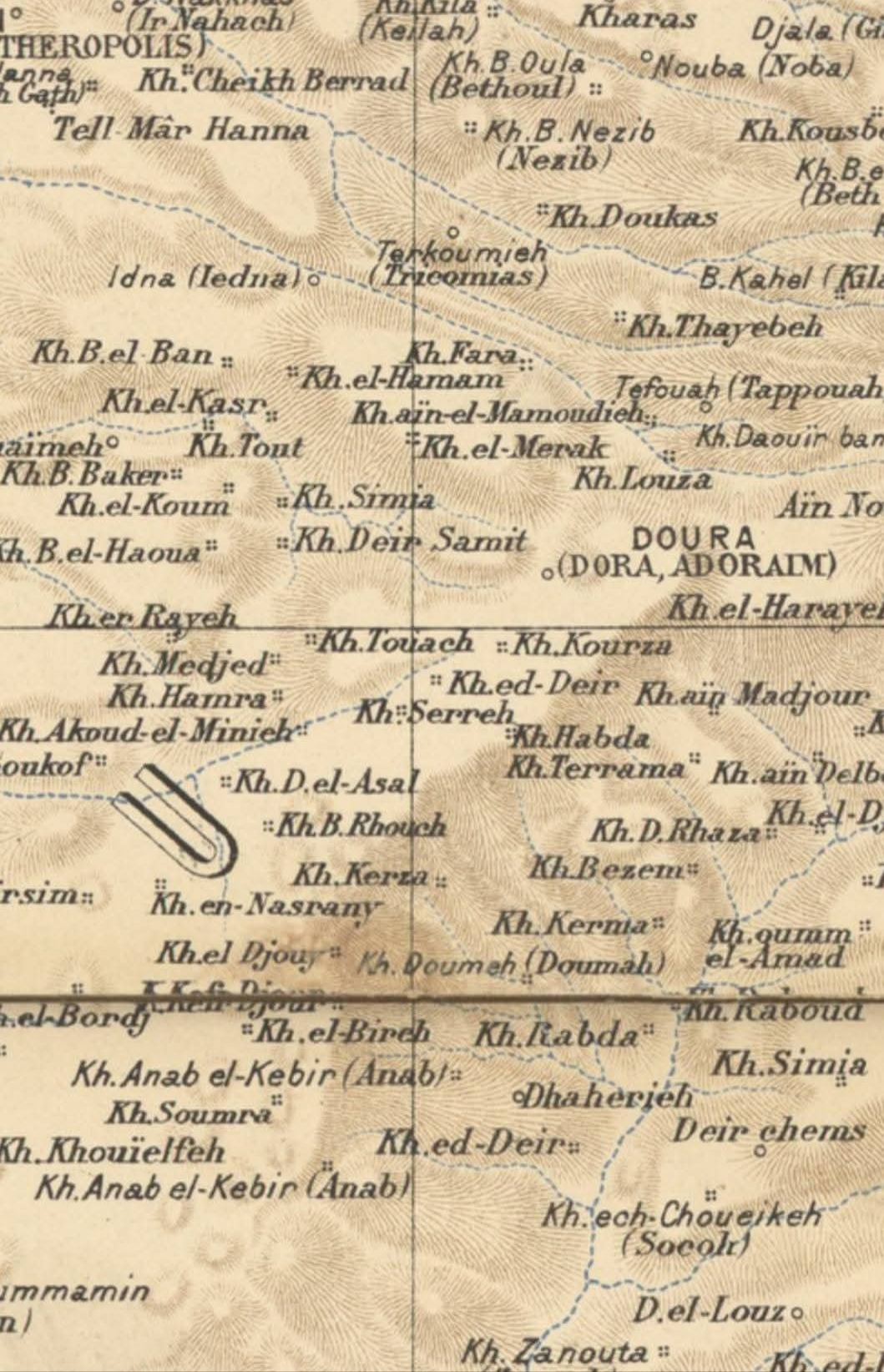
KHIRBET SIMIA, 1881

== Bibliography ==
- Conder, C.R.; Kitchener, H.H. (1883). The Survey of Western Palestine: Memoirs of the Topography, Orography, Hydrography, and Archaeology. Vol. 3. London: Committee of the Palestine Exploration Fund.
- Government of Jordan, Department of Statistics (1964). First Census of Population and Housing. Volume I: Final Tables; General Characteristics of the Population (PDF).
- Guérin, Victor (1869). Description Géographique Historique et Archéologique de la Palestine (in French). Vol. 1: Judee, pt. 2. Paris: L'Imprimerie Nationale.
- Mills, E., ed. (1932). Census of Palestine 1931. Population of Villages, Towns and Administrative Areas. Jerusalem: Government of Palestine.
- Palmer, E.H. (1881). The Survey of Western Palestine: Arabic and English Name Lists Collected During the Survey by Lieutenants Conder and Kitchener, R. E. Transliterated and Explained by E.H. Palmer. Committee of the Palestine Exploration Fund.
