= Khirbet el-Muraq =

Herodian-era mansion in the southern West Bank

- Khurbet el-Muraq, Hilkiyah's Palace, Palace of Helcias
- Location within the West Bank
- 31°31′40.2″N 34°58′04.3″E
- Type: Elite residential complex, peristyle, triclinium, Roman-style baths, mik'vaot, hiding complexes
- Periods: Hasmonean, Herodian, early Roman periods
- Cultures: Jewish (Second Temple period), Hellenistic, Roman
- Location: Al-Muwarraq, West Bank
- Region: Hebron Hills/Judaean Lowlands
- Palestine grid: 197/604

History
- Built: 2nd/1st century BCE
- Abandoned: 132–136 CE
- Event(s): First Jewish–Roman War, Bar Kokhba revolt

Site notes
- Excavation dates: 1968–1972
- Archaeologists: Emanuel Damati

Khirbet el-Muraq, also known as Hilkiyah's Palace or Palace of Helcias, is an archaeological site located in the southern West Bank, in a transitional zone between the Hebron Hills and the Judaean Lowlands. The site features a mansion dating primarily to the Herodian and early Roman periods. The estate provides an example for the adoption of Hellenistic and Roman architectural forms and pan-Mediterranean trends by the Jewish elite during the late Second Temple period.

The mansion was organized around a peristyle courtyard with a central garden triclinium, indoor and outdoor dining spaces, a Roman-style bath suite, mikva'ot, advanced water management installations, and a watchtower with glacis-like walls. The site features mosaic floors, Nabataean-style capitals, and a stone sundial. In addition, underground hiding complexes, considered among the largest known in Judea, indicate that the site was reused during the Bar Kokhba revolt (132–136 CE), at which point it may have met its final destruction by fire.

== Location and geography ==
Khirbet el-Muraq is located in a village of the same name, which is administratively affiliated with the nearby city of Dura (the ancient Adoraim). It is situated approximately 12 kilometres (7.5 mi) west of Hebron. Geographically, it lies in a transitional zone between the Hebron Hills and the Judaean Lowlands (Shephelah). In classical antiquity, this area formed the boundary between the districts of Judea and Idumaea. According to one survey, the ancient settlement covered approximately 40 dunams, an area that is today largely overlain by the modern village.

== Archaeology ==
The mansion, measuring approximately 42 by 37 metres (138 ft × 121 ft), is organized around a central courtyard, with a built-up area of approximately 2,000 square meters. The central focus is a peristyle courtyard, an open-air area surrounded on all four sides by colonnaded porticoes. At its center is a garden triclinium, an outdoor dining installation with three stone benches arranged in a U-shaped form (probably covered originally with cushions and other textiles). It seems to have been set among trees within a garden environment. The complex also contains a large indoor triclinium with stuccos used for banqueting and receiving guests.

The complex also includes a Roman-style bath suite featuring a caldarium (hot bath), tepidarium (warm bath), and frigidarium (cold bath), using hypocausts. According to Shlomit Miller, while this type of bathhouse is known from other sites in late Second Temple Judea, it represents one of the earliest examples of a Roman-style bathhouse incorporated into a domestic context. Additionally, a stepped mikveh (Jewish ritual bath) was uncovered near the northern portico. An advanced water-management system, including channels and three cisterns, supported rainwater harvesting as well as the bath installations and the gardens. The complex is surrounded by a 1.5 metres (4.9 ft) wide wall. It also featured a watchtower integrated into the building's plan; its walls functioned as a sort of glacis.

According to Shlomit Miller, the site is perhaps "one of the best structures for understanding the lifestyle of the social elite during the late Second Temple period," adding that its mix of architectural and cultural elements characterizes "the culture of the period and the growing participation of local elites in a pan-Mediterranean culture that accelerated during the reign of Augustus and the early Principate." Jodi Magness writes that Khirbet el-Muraq is one of only two sites in the Palestine region (alongside Horvat Eleq) that "approach Italian 'classical villas' in terms of size, architectural features, and decorative elements."

=== Finds ===
The excavations carried out at the site revealed a high standard of living. Several rooms were adorned with mosaic floors, and the colonnades utilized Nabataean-style "blocked-out" capitals, comparable to examples found in Masada's western palace, indicating familiarity with architectural styles common in the region. Additionally, a stone-carved sundial was found at the site as spolia, though it was probably originally taken from the garden. The use of such instruments is well attested in Jerusalem's Upper City, at Horvat Eleq (in Ramat HaNadiv), and throughout the wider Roman world.

Finds from the palatial phase include stone vessels, ceramic vessels (including terra sigillata), prutot coins dated to years 2 and 3 of the First Jewish Revolt, and a Hadrianic coin from 117 CE.

A limestone slab bearing a graffito in Greek was discovered to the east of the tower, placed over a water channel. The inscription reads Ἑλκίας Σίμωνος ἔγρα(ψα), which can be translated as, "I, Helcias, son of Simon, wrote this." This inscription has helped establish an alternative name for the site, "the Palace of Helcias." Letters were incised on column drums: one bears the Greek delta, another the Hebrew lamed in the Jewish script, along with Nabataean numerals for nine, likely serving as construction marks indicating the placement of the drums within the columns.

=== Hiding complexes ===
Khirbet el-Muraq contains two subterranean hiding complexes carved beneath the mansion's foundations. The northern system, documented in 1979, is relatively modest, consisting of a 37 metres (121 ft) tunnel connection to a cistern under the northern wing. In contrast, the southern system, exposed in 2016, is a massive, sophisticated network spanning approximately 240 metres (790 ft), making it one of the largest known hiding systems in Judea. This system was accessed via a hidden square shaft beneath the mansion's floor, and features narrow tunnels. The system was designed to impede Roman soldiers, incorporating turns and stone locking mechanisms to seal off sections. It also features hundreds niches carved into the walls to hold oil lamps.

The builders of the southern system integrated pre-existing underground installations, such as water cisterns, quarries and storage cellars, into the network. A small underground mikveh was built within one of the underground halls, indicating the rebels were determined to maintain ritual purity even under harsh conditions. The remains of ash and charred wood found at the system's entrance suggest that these rebels were besieged and "smoked out" by the Roman army.

== Reconstruction of the site's history ==
The site developed in three phases. The earliest parts were built during the 2nd to 1st century BCE, and included the mikveh, a wall, tabun oven, and perhaps the watchtower; remains from this period likely include the Hellenistic oil lamp and a Seleucid coin. According to Miller, at this stage the complex could be either an estate or a small village. The site was significantly expanded in another phase, during which the peristyle area was constructed. This phase likely represents the peak of occupation at the site and displays features paralleling those of Hasmonean and Herodian palaces. The last phase appears hasty and did not adhere to symmetrical planning. It was during this period that the hideout systems were developed.

=== Owners ===
The presence of mikva'ot (Jewish ritual baths) and chalkstone vessels points to the Jewish identity of the owners. However, it remains unclear whether they were Jews native to the same region, Jews settled there under Herod, or descendants of Idumaean families who converted to Judaism (either forcibly or voluntarily) during the reign of John Hyrcanus in the late 2nd century BCE.

=== Destruction ===
The site's original excavator, Emanuel Damati, believed that it met its end during the First Jewish Revolt, possibly in 68 CE, in the course of Vespasian's military campaign in Idumaea. A coin of Hadrian dating from 117 CE found at the site was interpreted by him as a stray find.

An alternative interpretation has been proposed by Dvir Raviv and Boaz Langford, who notes that a Roman discus lamp dating to the post-revolt period in the early 2nd century CE was found with signs of burning in the collapse of the mansion's gate, beneath charred wooden beams. On this basis, Raviv and Langford argue that the site's destruction should be dated not to the First Jewish Revolt but to the Bar Kokhba revolt (following an earlier suggestion by Zissu), which occurred some six decades later, between 132 and 136 CE. They suggest the villa functioned as headquarters for the Jewish rebels during this revolt.

Shlomit Miller writes that the evidence for settlement at the site during the Bar Kokhba Revolt, as presented by Raviv and Langford, is convincing. She adds, however, that it remains unclear whether the site was at least partially destroyed during the First Jewish Revolt, resettled after 70 CE and before 132 CE, and only later reused by rebels during the Bar Kokhba Revolt, when it was ultimately destroyed.

== Research history ==
The earliest archaeological documentation of the site was carried out in the 1880s, when Claude Reignier Conder and Herbert H. Kitchener of the Palestine Exploration Fund (PEF) recorded "caves and two large foundations" at the location. A survey was conducted at the site in 1967–1968 by the Emergency Survey team, who documented a structure excavated by local residents, as well as pottery sherds from the Hellenistic and Roman periods, including terra sigillata ware. The site was excavated between 1968 and 1972 by Emanuel Damati on behalf of the Archaeology Staff Officer for the Judea and Samaria Area. Surveys were conducted by Yigal Teper and Yuval Shahar in 1979, Boaz Zissu in 2001/2, and Dagan (as part of the Amatzia survey) in 2006/7. Dvir Raviv and Boaz Langford surveyed the hideout systems in 2016.

== See also ==
- Atrium
- Herodian architecture
- Horvat Eleq
- Roman villa

== Bibliography ==
=== Sources ===
- Conder, C.R.; Kitchener, H.H. (1883). The Survey of Western Palestine: Memoirs of the Topography, Orography, Hydrography, and Archaeology. Vol. 3. London: Committee of the Palestine Exploration Fund.
- Lupu, Eran; Heimbach, Marfa; Schneider, Naomi; Cotton, Hannah, eds. (2018). "Kh. el-Muraq". Corpus inscriptionum Iudaeae/Palaestinae: a multi-lingual corpus of the inscriptions from Alexander to Muhammad. Vol. IV: Iudaea / Idumaea. Berlin: de Gruyter. pp. 1289–1291. ISBN 978-3-11-022219-7.
- Magness, Jodi (2011). Stone and Dung, Oil and Spit: Jewish Daily Life in the Time of Jesus. Eerdmans. ISBN 978-0802865588.
- Miller, Shulamit (2024). "מבט מחודש על "ארמון חלקיה" בח'רבת אל־מורק - The Peristyle House at Kh. el-Muraq". Eretz-Israel: Archaeological, Historical and Geographical Studies / ארץ-ישראל: מחקרים בידיעת הארץ ועתיקותיה (in Hebrew). 35: 450–461. ISSN 0071-108X.
- Raviv, Dvir; Langford, Boaz (2017). ""מסתור חלקיה" – מערכת מסתור גדולה בגבול השפלה וההר" ["Ḥilqiyyah Hideout" – a large hiding complex on the border between the Shephelah and the hill country]. מחקרי ארץ יהודה (in Hebrew). א: 57–69.

=== Further reading ===
- Damati, Emanuel (1977). "Hilkiah's Palace". In Broshi, Magen (ed.). In Between Hermon and Sinai: Memorial to Amnon (in Hebrew). Jerusalem: Yedidim. pp. 93–113.
