= At-Tabaqa =

at-Tabaqa
- Municipality type D (Village council)

Arabic transcription(s)
  - Arabic: خربة الطبقه
- Location of at-Tabaqa within Palestine
- Coordinates: 31°29′55″N 35°00′55″E
- State: State of Palestine
- Governorate: Hebron

Government
  - Type: Village council

Population (2006)
  - Total: 1,435

at-Tabaqa (Arabic: خربة الطبقه) is a Palestinian village located seven kilometers west of Hebron. The town is in the Hebron Governorate Southern West Bank. According to the Palestinian Central Bureau of Statistics, the village had a population of 1,435 in mid-year 2006.

== History ==
In 1961, under Jordanian rule, Tabaqa had 200 inhabitants.
