= Sikka, Hebron =

Village in Hebron Governorate, Palestine

Sikka سكة
- Sikka, Hebron
- Location of Sikka within Palestine
- Coordinates: 31°29′28″N 34°56′39″E
- Palestine grid: 144/100
- Country: Palestine
- Governorate: Hebron Governorate
- Elevation: 425 m (1,394 ft)

Population (2017)
  - Total: 914
- Name meaning: Kh. Sirreh, the ruin of cold

Sikka is a Palestinian village in the Dura district of the Hebron Governorate, in the south of the West Bank.

== Population ==
The 2017 census listed the village's population at approximately 914.

== Geography ==
Located west of the city of Dura, the village is approximately 425 metres (1,394 ft) above sea level.

== History ==
=== Ottoman era ===
In 1883, the PEF's Survey of Western Palestine found "ruined walls, caves, and cisterns" in Sikka.

=== Jordanian era ===
After the 1948 Arab–Israeli War, the area fell under Jordanian rule. The Jordanian census of 1961 found 250 inhabitants in "Kh Sikka".

== See also ==
- Dura, Hebron
- Hebron Governorate

== Bibliography ==
- Conder, C.R.; Kitchener, H.H. (1883). The Survey of Western Palestine: Memoirs of the Topography, Orography, Hydrography, and Archaeology. Vol. 3. London: Committee of the Palestine Exploration Fund.
- Government of Jordan, Department of Statistics (1964). First Census of Population and Housing. Volume I: Final Tables; General Characteristics of the Population (PDF).
- Mills, E., ed. (1932). Census of Palestine 1931. Population of Villages, Towns and Administrative Areas. Jerusalem: Government of Palestine.
- Palmer, E.H. (1881). The Survey of Western Palestine: Arabic and English Name Lists Collected During the Survey by Lieutenants Conder and Kitchener, R. E. Transliterated and Explained by E.H. Palmer. Committee of the Palestine Exploration Fund.
