= Hatta =

Hatta may refer to:

Places

- Hatta, Hebron, a Palestinian village located in the Hebron Governorate, Palestine
- Hatta, Gaza, a Palestinian Arab village depopulated in 1948
- Hatta, Madhya Pradesh, a village in Damoh District, Madhya Pradesh, India
- Hatta, United Arab Emirates, a mountain town in the United Arab Emirates
- Hatta Fort Hotel in the United Arab Emirates
- Hatta Station in Nagoya, Japan
- Kintetsu Hatta Station on the Kintetsu Nagoya Line in Japan
- Ise-Hatta Station in Mie, Japan
- Kukkar Hatta, a town in Pakistan

Given name

- Hatta Rajasa (born 1953), Indonesian politician
- Mohammad Hatta (1902–1980), Indonesian independence leader and first Vice President

Surname

- Hamis Hatta, Timorese politician
- Ichiro Hatta (1906–1983), Japanese wrestler and politician
- Jaslee Hatta, Singapore football player
- Janet Hatta (born 1953), actress in Japan
- Kayo Hatta (1958–2005), Asian American filmmaker, writer, and community activist
- Madd Hatta, the owner of Paid in Full Entertainment
- Naoki Hatta (born 1986), Japanese football player
- Shinya Hatta (born 1984), Japanese football player
- Uichiro Hatta, Japanese football player
- Yoichi Hatta, Japanese engineer

== Other ==
- the Hatta number, a dimensionless parameter in chemical reaction engineering
- Hatta Club, a sports club based in Dubai
- Hatta, another name for the Keffiyeh
- The Hatter, a character in Through the Looking-Glass, by Lewis Carroll
