= Hatta, Hebron =

Village in Hebron Governorate, Palestine

Hatta, Hebron Arabic: (حتا (الخليل
- Hatta, Hebron
- Location of Hatta, Hebron within Palestine
- Coordinates: 31°37′07″N 35°01′37″E
- Country: Palestine
- Governorate: Hebron Governorate
- Elevation: 405 m (1,329 ft)

Population (2017)
  - Total: 1,155

Hatta is a Palestinian village located in the Hebron Governorate, in the southern West Bank.

== Geography ==
The village is located 13 km northwest of Hebron, at an elevation of 405 meters above sea level. It is bordered to the east by the town of Nuba , to the north by the town of Kharas, to the west by the Green Line, and to the south by the town of Beit Ula.

== Population ==
According to the Palestinian Central Bureau of Statistics, its population in 2017 was approximately 1,155.

== See also ==
- Hebron Governorate
