= Sa'ir =

Palestinian town in Hebron

Sa'ir سعير
- Municipality type B

Arabic transcription(s)
  - Arabic: سعير
  - Latin: Sa'eer (official); Saiour (unofficial)
- Location of Sa'ir within the West Bank Location of Sa'ir within Palestine
- Coordinates: 31°35′04″N 35°08′43″E
- Palestine grid: 163/110
- State: State of Palestine
- Governorate: Hebron

Government
  - Type: Municipality
  - Head of Municipality: موسى غيث فروخ

Area
  - Total: 117.0 km^{2} (45.2 sq mi)

Population (2017)
  - Total: 20,722
  - Density: 177.1/km^{2} (458.7/sq mi)
- Name meaning: from personal name, or Zior

Sa'ir (Arabic: سعير, also spelled Saeer, Seir, or Si'ir) is a Palestinian town in the Hebron Governorate of the State of Palestine, in the southern West Bank, located 8 kilometers (5.0 mi) northeast of Hebron. Nearby localities include Beit Fajjar and al-Arroub to the north, Beit Ummar to the northwest, Halhul to the west and Beit Einun and ash-Shuyukh to the south. The Dead Sea is just east of Sa'ir's municipal borders. In the 2017 census Palestinian Central Bureau of Statistics, the town had a population of 20,722.

It has municipal jurisdiction over 117,000 dunams, 6,000 of which is built-up area and 11,715 of which is cultivated. The main economic activities in Sa'ir are agriculture and the Israeli labor market, although the latter has been adversely affected as a result of the Israeli restrictions following the Second Intifada in 2000–04. Olives are the major cash crop.

== History ==
It is often thought that Si'ir is identical with Zior (or Zi'or), a biblical town mentioned in the Book of Joshua (15:54) among the cities of Judah, near Hebron and others in the Hebron Hills. Yet, not all scholars accepted this identification. According to ARIJ, Sa'ir "was established on the town of Saeer (صعير) or Saiour (صعيور)", and during the Roman era the town was known as "Sior".

An archaeological survey of the village revealed pottery from the Iron Age II (under the Kingdom of Judah), Persian, Roman, Byzantine (the predominant finds), medieval, and Ottoman periods. The village's dense core, located near the spring, is the site of the ancient settlement's tell. Nearby caves yielded remains from the Chalcolithic and Early Bronze Age periods. In 2024, Talmudic-era menorah engravings were discovered on a doorway slab in the village's kasbah.

The PEF's Survey of Western Palestine (SWP), wrote that: "The tomb of El 'Ais (Esau), south of the village, is in a chamber 37 feet east and west by 20 feet north and south, with a Mihrab on the south wall. The tomb is 12 feet long, 3 1/2 feet broad, 5 feet high, covered with a dark green cloth and a canopy above. An ostrich egg is hung near. North of the chamber is a vaulted room of equal size, and to the east is an open court with a fig-tree, and a second cenotaph rudely plastered, said to be that of Esau's slave. Rock-cut tombs exist south-west of this place."

A heart-shaped lamp marked with arches framing birds, today on display at the Flagellation Museum, is marked as coming from Sa'ir. Similar lamps are dated to the early Islamic period.

Suriano, a 15th century Franciscan custos, wrote that the House of Isaac, then a mosque where Muslims worship, can be found in Syeir. He mentioned that he had seen Jewish antiquities there and described the area as not being sown but rather untamed, arid, and a habitat for animals and game.

In Al-Uns al-Jalil bi-Tarikh al-Quds wa-l-Khalil, Mujīr al-Dīn al-ʿUlaymī mentions a village located between the districts (aʿmāl) of Jerusalem and Hebron, near the city of al-Khalil (Hebron), named Sa'ir. He states that its mosque was said to contain the Tomb (Maqam) of the Prophet Esau (‘Īs).

During the Mamluk period (13th–16th centuries), Sa'ir was mentioned in Islamic endowment (waqf) records, together with Beit Ummar and other villages in the Hebron district.

=== Ottoman era ===
In 1549 (956 AH), Sa'ir was involved in a series of conflicts in the Hebron district. The Jerusalem Sharia Court Register records a case concerning Muhammad ibn Ahmad ibn Sa'id, the shaykh of Sa'ir, who was accused of causing unrest in the Hebron district and gathering local inhabitants and members of Arab Hutaym. He was involved in fighting with Bani Adi of Zakariya and inhabitants of surrounding villages, resulting in deaths and insecurity along the roads. Following the appointment of Hasan Bey as governor of Jerusalem, Ottoman forces captured Muhammad ibn Sa'id in Hebron and attempted to transfer him to Jerusalem. During the transfer, Ottoman forces were attacked near Halhul by fellahin and their Bedouin allies from Sa'ir and neighboring villages, who attempted to release Muhammad ibn Sa'id. The register names inhabitants of Yatta, Halhul, Sa'ir, Bayt Khayran, and Fuqin, together with members of Arab Hutaym, among those involved in the attack. A battle followed in which Murad Bayraqdar and several men accompanying the Ottoman forces were killed. Muhammad ibn Sa'id was not released, and the Ottoman authorities subsequently transferred him to Jerusalem by way of Beit Nattif, where he was brought before the Sharia Court and questioned over the killings and his disobedience to Ottoman authority. Later, the register records another conflict involving Sa'ir and neighboring villages. The inhabitants of Qufin, Sa'ir, Bayt Khayran, Marnia, and Halhul attacked Zakariya and took livestock from the village. The inhabitants of Zakariya mobilized people from Nahalin and Faghur, resulting in a clash in which approximately 50 men were killed. Hasan Bey subsequently sent Ottoman troops, cavalry, and janissaries to investigate the conflict and bring the opposing parties together. Rabayea describes the earlier events as an uprising involving the villagers and their Bedouin allies, who fought Ottoman troops near Halhul in an attempt to prevent the transfer of the shaykh of Sa'ir to Jerusalem. The study also records a subsequent attack on Zakariya by followers of Muhammad ibn Sa'id, during which approximately fifty people from the two sides were killed.

In 1596, Sa'ir appeared in the Ottoman tax registers as part of the nahiya of Halil in the Liwa of Quds. It had an entirely Muslim population consisting of 72 households. Taxes were paid on wheat, barley, summer crops, olive trees, goats and/or beehives.

During the 1834 Peasants' Revolt in Palestine, the first reported battle occurred near Sa'ir when local fellahin (village peasants) and the Ta'amirah tribe, based in the Bethlehem area, rose in rebellion and subsequently attacked the Egyptians camped near Hebron, the Egyptians put an end to the disturbances but they were confronted by the Bedouins (Ta'amirah) and the people of Sa'ir who managed to repel the Egyptians inflicting heavy losses in soldiers, funds and equipment.

Southwest of Tekoa, in Wadi Arrub, lies the village of Sa'ir. The surrounding valleys and mountain slopes are described as being scattered with arbutus, dwarf oaks, small firs, various shrubs, and za'atar. The area is said to resemble the landscape around Hebron, with numerous ruins and ancient sites encountered throughout, regarded as testimony to the population of ancient Judea.

During the mid- and late nineteenth century in the Mount Hebron region, local alliances were organized along the lines of the Qays–Yaman factional division in Palestine, notably al-Qaysiyya al-Fauqa and al-Qaysiyya al-Tahta. Al-Qaysiyya al-Fauqa, headed by the ʿAmr clan of Dura, included the villages of Yatta, Sa'ir, Bani Na'im, al-Shuyukh, al-Dawayima, Idhna, and as-Samu. These villages formed the nahiya (subdistrict) associated with al-Qaysiyya al-Fauqa. These factional alignments played a significant role in the politics of Mount Hebron. During the civil strife of the 1850s, clashes between the rival camps resulted in battles that affected both the rural alliances and the town of Hebron itself. Nineteenth-century reports also describe attacks on Hebron by forces from Sa'ir and al-Shuyukh, located to the north of the town, with Yatta, to the south, joining the hostilities.

The French explorer Victor Guérin visited the village in the 1860s, and found it having about 400 inhabitants. He mentioned a few rock-cut tombs that are still in use; they are locked by a burial stone, and are reopened by locals whenever a new body is buried.

SWP described Sa'ir in 1883 as "a village of moderate size, in a valley surrounded with cultivated ground." A maqam (shrine) located in Sa'ir was believed by the local Muslims to house the tomb of Esau who they referred to as "Aisa." The SWP stated this identification was false and that Esau's tomb was in the Biblical Mount Seir.

Under the name Sa'in, an Ottoman village list of about 1870 indicated 84 houses and a population of 186, though it is proposed that the population count included men, only.

=== British Mandate period ===
In the 1922 census of Palestine, conducted by the British Mandate authorities, Sa'ir had a population of 1,477 inhabitants, all Muslim. In the 1931 census the population of Si'ir was a total of 1,967, still entirely Muslim, in 388 inhabited houses.

In the 1945 statistics the population of Si'ir was 2,710, all Muslims, who owned 92,423 dunams of land according to an official land and population survey. 2,483 dunams were plantations and irrigable land, 10,671 for cereals, while 76 dunams were built-up (urban) land.

=== Jordanian period ===
In the wake of the 1948 Arab–Israeli War, and after the 1949 Armistice Agreements, Sa'ir came under Jordanian rule.

In 1961, the population of Si'ir was 2,511.

=== 1967 war and aftermath ===
Sa'ir has been under Israeli occupation since the 1967 Six-Day War. The population in the 1967 census conducted by the Israeli authorities was 4,172.

In the 1970s, the Israeli Military Governorate sought to settle the Arab al-Rashaydeh tribe on land acquired from residents of Sa'ir. Relations between the tribe and the residents of Sa'ir remained tense, as the latter continued to assert ownership of the land allocated to the tribe, while the Rashayida repeatedly requested permission to leave the area.

Following the 1993 Oslo Accords Sa'ir was designated within "Area B" giving the Palestinian National Authority (PNA) control over the town's civil affairs while Israel maintained its control over security. In 1997, an elected 13-member municipal council was established by the PNA to administer Sa'ir. Its municipal borders include a number of small villages, including al-Uddeisa, ad-Duwwara, Irqan Turad, Kuziba, Wadi ar-Rum and Ras at-Tawil. Principal families include Al-Shlaldah, Al-Froukh, Al-Lahaleeh, Al-Jaradat, Al-Mtur, Al-Jabarin, Al-Kawazbeh, Al-Arameen and Al-Turweh. Hakim Shlaldah was elected mayor in the 2005 municipal elections.

In January 2013, Rafat Jaradat, a 30 year old man from Sa'ir, died in jail five days after he was arrested by the Israelis. Israeli sources said his death was caused by "sudden heart attack while under interrogation", while Palestinian officials said that Jaradat had been tortured while in Israeli detention. His body had bruises and broken ribs, which the Israelis said came from attempts to revive him, while his brother said it looked as if Jaradat had been severely beaten.

Between October 2015 and mid January 2016 eleven Sair residents were shot dead by the Israeli army in alleged attacks on Israeli soldiers. Almost half of them were killed at Beit Einun Junction where the IDF controls access to the town.

In June 2025, during the Twelve-Day War, a ballistic missile fired from Yemen by Houthis hit the village, injuring five people, including three children.

== Demography ==
Sa'ir is home to several families, such as Al Froukh, Al Jabareen, Al Jaradat, Al Kawazbeh, Al Mtur, Al Shlaldah, Al Turweh, and others.

== Customs and Traditions ==
The songs of istisqa' (rain-seeking rituals) in the village of Sa'ir, in the Hebron district, have been described as preserving elements tracing back to ancient Canaanite beliefs dating approximately 4,000 years.

An example of sahja wa al-samer verse from Saʿir illustrates the improvisational and dialogic character of rural Palestinian wedding performance, combining formal greetings with playful social exchange and courtship imagery: “Welcome, welcome-greetings to you. First, I will not be the one to begin, and the young woman of the clan came to me.

No-you have bound me by oath, young man; not one among you stands properly adorned. She called to me and smiled.”

Ali Qleibo notes that the people of Sa'ir claim descent from Esau.

== Bibliography ==
- Barron, J. B., ed. (1923). Palestine: Report and General Abstracts of the Census of 1922. Government of Palestine.
- Conder, C.R. (1881). "Tour of Their Royal Highnesses Princes Albert Victor and George of Wales in Palestine". Quarterly Statement - Palestine Exploration Fund. 13: 214–234.
- Conder, C.R. (1889). "Bezetha". Quarterly Statement - Palestine Exploration Fund. 22: 122–123.
- Conder, C.R.; Kitchener, H.H. (1883). The Survey of Western Palestine: Memoirs of the Topography, Orography, Hydrography, and Archaeology. Vol. 3. London: Committee of the Palestine Exploration Fund.
- Dauphin, C. (1998). La Palestine byzantine, Peuplement et Populations. BAR International Series 726 (in French). Vol. III : Catalogue. Oxford: Archeopress. ISBN 0-860549-05-4.
- Government of Jordan, Department of Statistics (1964). First Census of Population and Housing. Volume I: Final Tables; General Characteristics of the Population (PDF).
- Government of Palestine, Department of Statistics (1945). Village Statistics, April, 1945.
- Guérin, V. (1869). Description Géographique Historique et Archéologique de la Palestine (in French). Vol. 1: Judee, pt. 3. Paris: L'Imprimerie Nationale.
- Hadawi, S. (1970). Village Statistics of 1945: A Classification of Land and Area ownership in Palestine. Palestine Liberation Organization Research Center.
- Hartmann, M. (1883). "Die Ortschaftenliste des Liwa Jerusalem in dem türkischen Staatskalender für Syrien auf das Jahr 1288 der Flucht (1871)". Zeitschrift des Deutschen Palästina-Vereins. 6: 102–149.
- Hütteroth, W.-D.; Abdulfattah, K. (1977). Historical Geography of Palestine, Transjordan and Southern Syria in the Late 16th Century. Erlanger Geographische Arbeiten, Sonderband 5. Erlangen, Germany: Vorstand der Fränkischen Geographischen Gesellschaft. ISBN 3-920405-41-2.
- Mills, E., ed. (1932). Census of Palestine 1931. Population of Villages, Towns and Administrative Areas. Jerusalem: Government of Palestine.
- Palmer, E.H. (1881). The Survey of Western Palestine: Arabic and English Name Lists Collected During the Survey by Lieutenants Conder and Kitchener, R. E. Transliterated and Explained by E.H. Palmer. Committee of the Palestine Exploration Fund.
- Socin, A. (1879). "Alphabetisches Verzeichniss von Ortschaften des Paschalik Jerusalem". Zeitschrift des Deutschen Palästina-Vereins. 2: 135–163.
