= Halhul =

Municipality type A in Hebron, Palestinian territories

Halhul حلحول
- Municipality type A (City)

Arabic transcription(s)
  - Arabic: حلحول
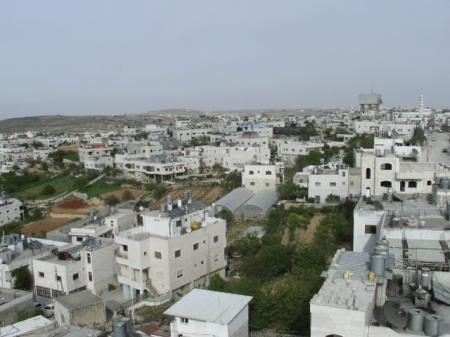
- Halhul, 2009

- Location of Halhul within Palestine
- Coordinates: 31°34′44″N 35°05′57″E
- Palestine grid: 160/109
- State: Palestine
- Governorates of Palestine: Hebron

Government
  - Type: City
  - Head of Municipality: Hijazi Moreb

Area
  - Total: 37.3 km^{2} (14.4 sq mi)

Population (2017)
  - Total: 27,031
  - Density: 725/km^{2} (1,880/sq mi)
- Name meaning: from "Hulhul", a personal name
- Website: www.halhul-city.ps

Halhul (Arabic: حلحول, transliteration: Ḥalḥūl) is a Palestinian city located in the southern part of the West Bank, 5 kilometres (3.1 mi) north of Hebron in the Hebron Governorate of Palestine. The town, bordered by Sa'ir and al-Shuyukh to the east, Beit Ummar and al-Arroub refugee camp to the north, and Kharas and Nuba westwards, is located 916 m above sea level, and is the highest inhabited place in the State of Palestine. According to the Palestinian Central Bureau of Statistics, the city had a population of 27,031 inhabitants in 2017.

== History ==
=== Antiquity ===
The Arabic name conserves the biblical toponym for the site, (Hebrew:חַלְחוּל; Greek: Αἰλουά/Άλοόλ; Latin Alula,) which is believed to reflect a Canaanite word meaning "to tremble (from the cold)". According to the Bible, Halhul was a city in the tribal territory of Judah, located in the hill country near Beth-zur. Biblical scholar Edward Robinson identified the modern town with the "Halhul" mentioned in the Book of Joshua. John Kitto noted that "the name has remained unchanged for more than 3,300 years".

According to a Jewish tradition, Halhul was the burial place of Gad the Seer. During the late Second Temple period, Halhul (Greek: Alurus) and its immediate environs were considered a part of Idumea. During the First Jewish–Roman War, an Idumean army encamped in Halhul during their conflict with Simon bar Giora. During the Bar Kokhba revolt, the town's defenses were fortified. A considerable amount of pottery has been unearthed bearing inscriptions in ancient Hebrew, most of them reading "To the king" (LMLK) and mentioning names of locations nearby. Handles with Jewish names inscribed in Greek have been found from the Hellenistic period.

Roman and Islamic house foundations have been dug deeply into older layers of habitation. Building remains with mosaic pavement with writing in Greek has been found on the site (called 'Aqd al-Qin) of a former church. Byzantine ceramics have also been found.

=== Middle Ages ===
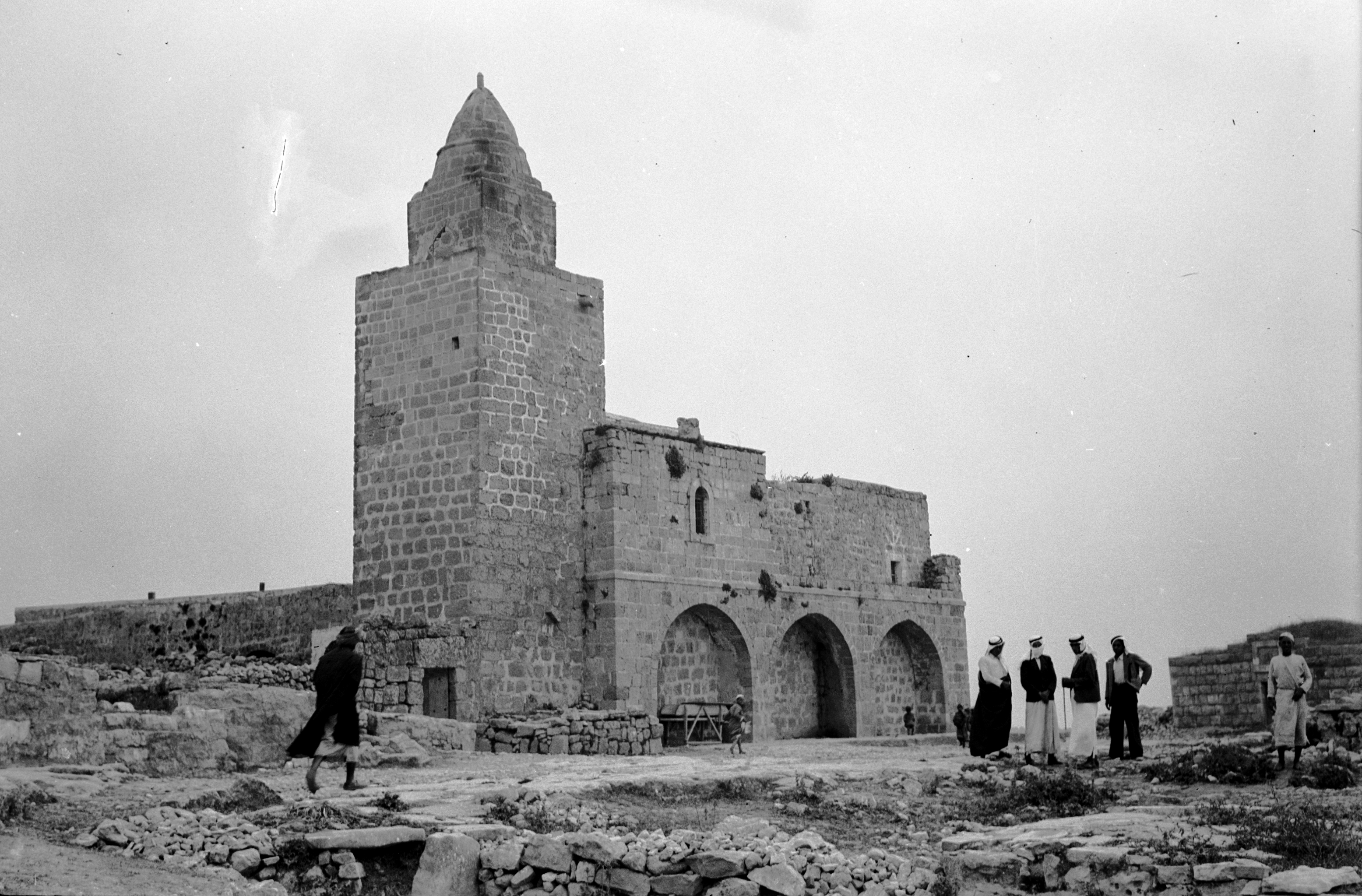
Neby Yunis, 1940

During repairs to the Nabi Yunis shrine, a slab of limestone was discovered there with a Fatimid-era epitaph, which is currently stored in the Islamic Museum in Jerusalem. The original description of the epitaph by Abdullah el-Azzeh dated it to 674 and claimed it was the oldest Islamic inscription discovered in Palestine. However, the historian Moshe Sharon translated the inscription as dating to March or April 966. The deceased person named in the epitaph, according to el-Azzeh, was Lalak ibn Rumi al-Jarmi, but Sharon asserts this was a translation error and the deceased was named Zayd ibn Rumi al-Harami. The nisba 'al-Harami' indicated the man belonged to the Haram clan of the Judham tribe which had been established in the region throughout the early Islamic period (7th–11th centuries).

A Muslim traditionist from Halhul, Abd al-Rahman ibn Abdallah ibn Abd al-Rahman al-Halhuli was recorded to have been killed fighting against the Crusaders in 1148–1149. The chronicler Ali of Herat documented in 1173 that Halhul was a part of the Crusader Kingdom of Jerusalem and contained the tomb of Yunis ibn Matta (Jonah, son of Amittai). In 1226, the Ayyubid sultan al-Mu'azzam Isa had one of his mamluks, the governor of Hebron Rashid al-Din Faraj, construct the minaret of Halhul's mosque. That same year, the geographer Yaqut al-Hamawi visited Halhul, reporting that it lay between Hebron and Jerusalem and contained the tomb of Jonah.

Halhul was mentioned in two documents of a waqf (religious endowment) corpus from the Mamluk period (1260–1516) stored in Jerusalem's Islamic Museum; the waqf concerned agricultural revenues for the benefit of the Ibrahimi Mosque (Cave of the Patriarchs) in Hebron. The documents dated to the first decade of the 14th century. One of them is an acknowledgment by two ru'asa (headmen) of Halhul from the clan of al-Abbas of grain seed advancements to the village. The other document names six men from Halhul and nearby Beit Einun, three of whom belonged to the Abbas family, as guarantors of the peace for the nearby village of Nuba.

=== Ottoman period ===
Halhul, like the rest of Palestine, was incorporated into the Ottoman Empire in 1517. In the census of 1596, the village appeared in the tax registers as being in the nahiya of Hebron of the Liwa of Jerusalem. It had an all Muslim population of 92 households and paid taxes on wheat, barley, vineyards and fruit trees, occasional revenues, goats and/or beehives.

John Wilson described it in 1847 as a place of Jewish pilgrimage. Edward Robinson visited Halhul in 1852, describing its surroundings as "thrifty", with numerous fields, vineyards, cattle, and goats. He reported that it was the "head of its district" and that the old mosque was in poor condition and had a tall minaret from which many other villages could be seen. The French explorer Victor Guérin visited the village in 1863, and found it to have about 700 inhabitants. He mentions graves dating from the Jewish period carved in the rocks, a spring, Ain Ayoub (Job's spring) on the southern side of the hill which furnished the locals with water; a mosque Djama'a Nebi Yunis (mosque of the prophet Jonah) built of ancient stone, foreign access to which was forbidden.

An Ottoman village list from about 1870 found that Halhul had a population of 380, in 119 houses, though the population count included only men. In 1883, the PEF's Survey of Western Palestine described Halhul as a large stone village on a hilltop, with two springs and a well. The mosque appeared to be a "modern" building.

=== British Mandate period ===
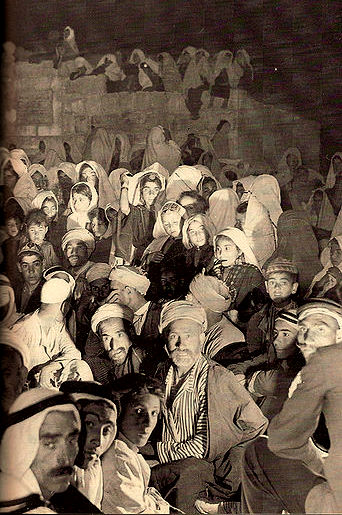
Villagers waiting for an open-air film show, 1940

In the 1922 census of Palestine conducted by the British Mandate authorities, Halhul had a population of 1,927, all Muslim. This had increased at the time of 1931 census, when Halhul, together with the surrounding Kh. Haska, Kh. en Nuqta, Kh. Beit Khiran, Kh. Baqqar and Kh. ez Zarqa had a population of 2,523 people in 487 houses. Except for one Christian woman, the population was still all Muslim.

In July 1939, during the Arab Revolt, the village was the site of an atrocity committed by the British Black Watch Regiment. In an attempt to force the villagers to give up weapons they were suspected of hiding, all the men in the village were imprisoned in a wire cage in the sun with little water. According to the British official Keith-Roach, after permission had been obtained, the officers

... instructed that they be kept there [in an open cage] and he gave them half a pint of water per diem. I saw the original order. The weather was very hot for it was summer. According to Indian Army Medical standards, four pints of water a day is the minimum that a man can live upon exposed to hot weather. After 48 hours treatment most of the men were very ill and eleven old and enfeebled ones died. I was instructed that no civil inquest should be held. Finally, the High Commissioner, MacMichael, decided compensation should be paid, and my Assistant and I assessed the damage at the highest rate allowed by the law, and paid out over three thousand pounds to the bereft families.

Palestinian versions put the death toll from dehydration at 13, with one more person shot as he endeavoured to escape. Some witnesses mentioned a second cage, either for women or a 'good' cage with adequate water for men who cooperated. A man who was driven by thirst to falsely claim to have hidden a gun down a well was killed when he failed to retrieve it.

In the 1945 statistics the population of Halhul was 3,380 Muslims, who owned 37,334 dunams of land according to an official land and population survey. Of this, 5,529 dunams were for plantations and irrigable land, 13,656 for cereals, while 165 dunams were built-up (urban) land.

=== Jordanian period ===
In the wake of the 1948 Arab–Israeli War, and after the 1949 Armistice Agreements, Halhul was ruled by Jordan. In 1961, the population of Halhul was 5,387.

=== Post-1967 ===
Since the 1967 Six-Day War, Halhul, like the rest of the West Bank, has been occupied by Israel; since 1995, it has been governed by the Palestinian Authority as part of Area A of the West Bank.

==== Israeli occupation ====
In March 1979, the Israel Defense Forces (IDF) enforced a curfew in Halhul lasting sixteen days. Two youths, one a young girl, were shot and killed by a Jewish settler and an Israeli soldier while protesting during the curfew.

During the Second Intifada, Israel confiscated some 1,500 dunams of land from the Halhul municipality.

30 September 2000 21-year-old Halhul resident, Muhammad Yunes Mahmoud 'Ayash a-Z'amreh, was injured by Israeli forces while in Beit Ummar and died of his wounds four days later on 3 October 2000. 22 October 2000 25-year-old Halhul resident Na'el 'Ali Zama'arah was shot dead by Israeli security forces during a clash that took place after a funeral service. On 12 February 2002, Israeli combat helicopters shelled the house of Lieutenant Ahmed 'Abdul 'Aziz Zama'ra in Halhul. The IDF operation also destroyed a police station, several houses, and a machine shop suspected of manufacturing weapons for Palestinian militants. A 22 year old Palestinian from Gaza, Tareq al-Hindawi, was shot dead during the operation. On 11 February 2002, a Palestinian Security Guards member was killed, and two other Palestinians were wounded, during an IDF operation that penetrated into Halhul to arrest Islamic Jihad leader Jneid Murad, together with Khaled Zabarah, suspected of involvement in smuggling and shooting incidents. On 14 May 2002, a special Israeli unit entered Halhul and besieged the Palestinian General Intelligence Service offices, shooting dead two security officers on their wanted list, Lieutenant Colonel Khaled Abu al-Khiran and Lieutenant Ahmed 'Abdul 'Aziz Zama'ra, as they attempted to escape. An IDF spokesman said the two were wanted for attacks on Israelis in the Hebron area, and had been shot for refusing to halt. According to Palestinian sources, both had been targeted by previous Israeli attempts to kill them, one involving a missile attack on their office. The IDF also arrested Jamal Hasan Abu Ra'sbeh, a member of Force 17, and Yasser Arafat's personal guard.

In August 2003 Israeli police uncovered a large workhouse for fabricating forged drivers license and Israeli ID cards. According to a Tel Aviv University report, from June 2005 a four-man Jewish terrorist cell (who allegedly killed over 10 Palestinians) led by a former Jewish Defense League senior member, had totally burnt down the mayor of Halhul's house. No one was injured in that incident. On 24 March 2007 Israeli authorities demolished a house built without an Israeli permit. The case was fought in an appeal, reaching the Israeli Supreme Court, which confirmed the verdict. Demonstrations ensued. On 22 June 2007 Halhul resident Shadi Rajeh 'Abdallah al-Mtur was shot dead while walking to a grocery store contiguous to an Israeli checkpoint, after failing to obey an order to stop. He did not have an ID card. On 6 October 2011, two men from Halhul were arrested on charges of having murdered Asher and Yonatan Palmer as a result of a stone-throwing incident near the Israeli settlement of Kiryat Arba on 23 September 2011. In December 2011, the UNDP decided to assist in establishing a mental health center in Halhul. On 20 November 2012, a Halhul resident, Hamdi Muhammad Jawad Musa al-Fallah, was shot by IDF soldiers after aiming a laser pen at them during a clash between the soldiers and local Palestinians near the Halhul-Hebron bridge on Route 35. In May 2018, a vineyard with hundreds of mature vines was destroyed by unknown persons who left the Hebrew message "We will reach everywhere". On 9 June 2022, Israeli forces shot dead a 27-year old Palestinian civilian during a military raid in the town.

== Geography ==
Snow on Halhul (28 January 2017)

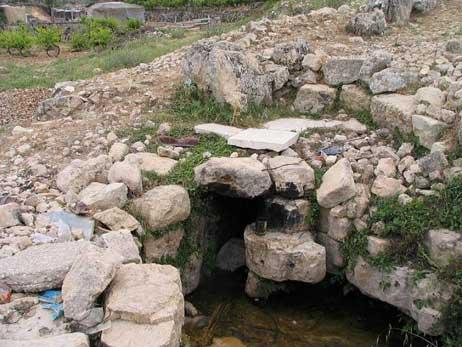
The spring of 'Ayin Ayoub

It is built atop Mount Nabi Yunis, the highest peak in the West Bank at 1,030 meters (3,380 ft) above sea level. The city has a land area of 37,335 dunams.

Half of the population is engaged in agriculture—tomatoes and squash being major forms of produce—on 10,000 of the estimated 19,000 dunams of fertile land surrounding the town. Some 8,000 dunums remain uncultivated because of Israeli practices of confiscating land and building settlements, or from water shortages and lack of developmental capital. Almost 2,000 dunams of land are reserved for olive cultivation. Livestock breeding and bee-keeping also form a significant element in the local economy.

The local residents of Halhul take pride in their vineyards and the grape industry.

Halhul has a twin city arrangement with the French town of Hennebont in Brittany.

The Israeli settlement of Karmei Tzur lies on the outskirts of Halhul. Halhul is surrounded by ancient burial caves.

== Demographics ==
In 1922, Halhul had a population of 1,927, rising to 2,523 in a 1931 British Mandate census. According to Sami Hadawi's 1945 land and population survey, Halhul had a recorded population of 3,380 Arabs. While a part of Jordan, in 1961, there were 5,387 residents. Under the Israelis, in censuses taken in 1982 and 1987, Halhul had a population of 6,040 and 9,800, respectively.

According to the first census by the Palestinian Central Bureau of Statistics (PCBS) in 1997, of the total 15,663 residents, 1,686 (10.8%) were Palestinian refugees. The gender makeup was 51.4% male and 48.6% female. About 54.7% of the inhabitants were below the age of 20, 41.2% were between the ages of 20 and 64, and 0.4% were over the age of 64.

The core population of Halhul is formed from four local tribes, Al Saadeh, Karjah, Al Zma'ra, and Al Doudah, in addition to Palestinian refugees who settled in Halhul as a result of forceful dislocation in 1948 and 1967, from surrounding villages and towns. According to local traditions, the Sawarah clan (from Beit Sur) is of Jewish origin. It was also reported that the local Shatrit family has Jewish ancestry tracing back to Jewish communities in North Africa. The name Shitrit is common among Moroccan Jews.

The health of the city residents and local villagers is serviced by many hospitals and clinics.

== Government ==
In 1976 an election held and lead to the election of Mohammad Milhem as Mayor of Halhul, who served around 28 years. In 2004 a new election was held under Palestinian Authority, which lead to the election of 13 Council members who elected Raed A Al Adarsh as the new Mayor of Halhul, who managed to restructure and modernize the municipality, After Raed Al Atrash's resignation, the council elected his deputy Zeyad Abu Yousef as new Mayor. In 2017, an election lead to the election of Hijazi Moreb as the new mayor who is still serving. Hijazi is a long-serving council member since 2004.

== Mosques ==
Eleven mosques now dot the city and its environs. These are: Nabi Yunis Mosque, Maqam Sahabi Abdullah ibn Mas'ud Mosque, Omari Mosque, al-Tharwa Mosque, al-Raba'at Mosque, Dharr Iqtat Mosque, Salah al-Din al-Ayyubi Mosque, al-Hwawer Mosque, al-Huda Mosque, al-Farouq Mosque and al-Nour Mosque.

== Notable people ==
- Ali Abu Awwad, peace activist and pacifist
- Mohammed Milhim, former mayor
- Mohammad Shaheen, scholar, literary critic, translator, and professor of English literature

== Bibliography ==
- Barron, J.B., ed. (1923). Palestine: Report and General Abstracts of the Census of 1922. Government of Palestine.
- Chomsky, N., "Scenes from the Uprising" Archived 23 September 2015 at the Wayback Machine. Z Magazine, July 1988
- Conder, C.R.; Kitchener, H.H. (1883). The Survey of Western Palestine: Memoirs of the Topography, Orography, Hydrography, and Archaeology. Vol. 3. London: Committee of the Palestine Exploration Fund.
- Dauphin, C. (1998). La Palestine byzantine, Peuplement et Populations. BAR International Series 726 (in French). Vol. III : Catalogue. Oxford: Archeopress. ISBN 0-860549-05-4.
- Government of Jordan, Department of Statistics (1964). First Census of Population and Housing. Volume I: Final Tables; General Characteristics of the Population (PDF).
- Government of Palestine, Department of Statistics (1945). Village Statistics, April, 1945.
- Guérin, V. (1869). Description Géographique Historique et Archéologique de la Palestine (in French). Vol. 1: Judee, pt. 3. Paris: L'Imprimerie Nationale.
- Hadawi, S. (1970). Village Statistics of 1945: A Classification of Land and Area ownership in Palestine. Palestine Liberation Organization Research Centre.
- Hartmann, M. (1883). "Die Ortschaftenliste des Liwa Jerusalem in dem türkischen Staatskalender für Syrien auf das Jahr 1288 der Flucht (1871)". Zeitschrift des Deutschen Palästina-Vereins. 6: 102–149.
- Hütteroth, W.-D.; Abdulfattah, K. (1977). Historical Geography of Palestine, Transjordan and Southern Syria in the Late 16th Century. Erlanger Geographische Arbeiten, Sonderband 5. Erlangen, Germany: Vorstand der Fränkischen Geographischen Gesellschaft. ISBN 3-920405-41-2.
- Mills, E., ed. (1932). Census of Palestine 1931. Population of Villages, Towns and Administrative Areas. Jerusalem: Government of Palestine.
- Palmer, E.H. (1881). The Survey of Western Palestine: Arabic and English Name Lists Collected During the Survey by Lieutenants Conder and Kitchener, R. E. Transliterated and Explained by E.H. Palmer. Committee of the Palestine Exploration Fund.
- Rapoport, Yossef (2025). Becoming Arab: The Formation of Arab Identity in the Medieval Middle East. Princeton: Princeton University Press. ISBN 9780691210636.*Robinson, E.; Smith, E. (1841). Biblical Researches in Palestine, Mount Sinai and Arabia Petraea: A Journal of Travels in the year 1838. Vol. 1. Boston: Crocker & Brewster.
- Robinson, E.; Smith, E. (1841). Biblical Researches in Palestine, Mount Sinai and Arabia Petraea: A Journal of Travels in the year 1838. Vol. 2. Boston: Crocker & Brewster. (p. 186)
- Robinson, E.; Smith, E. (1856). Later Biblical Researches in Palestine and adjacent regions: A Journal of Travels in the year 1852. London: John Murray. (pp. 278)
- Sharon, M. (2013). Corpus Inscriptionum Arabicarum Palaestinae, H-I. Vol. 5. BRILL. ISBN 978-90-04-25097-0. (Sharon, 2013, p. 278)
- Socin, A. (1879). "Alphabetisches Verzeichniss von Ortschaften des Paschalik Jerusalem". Zeitschrift des Deutschen Palästina-Vereins. 2: 135–163.
- Strange, le, G. (1890). Palestine Under the Moslems: A Description of Syria and the Holy Land from A.D. 650 to 1500. Committee of the Palestine Exploration Fund.
- Winslow, Phillip C. (2007). Victory for Us is to See You Suffer: In the West Bank with the Palestinians and the Israelis. Beacon Press. ISBN 978-0-8070-6906-6.
