= Ad-Duwwara =

ad-Duwwara
- Municipality type D (Village council)

Arabic transcription(s)
  - Arabic: الدوّارة
- Location of ad-Duwwara within Palestine
- Coordinates: 31°33′20.39″N 35°08′35.92″E
- State: State of Palestine
- Governorate: Hebron

Government
  - Type: Village council

Population (2006)
  - Total: 1,685

ad-Duwwara (Arabic: الدوّارة) is a Palestinian village located four kilometers east of Hebron.The village is in the Hebron Governorate Southern West Bank. According to the Palestinian Central Bureau of Statistics, the village had a population of 1,685 in mid-year 2006. The primary health care facilities for the village are located at Beit Einun, which are designated by the Ministry of Health as level 2.
