= Kharas =

Kharas خاراس
- Municipality type C

Arabic transcription(s)
  - Arabic: خاراس
  - Latin: Khuras (official)
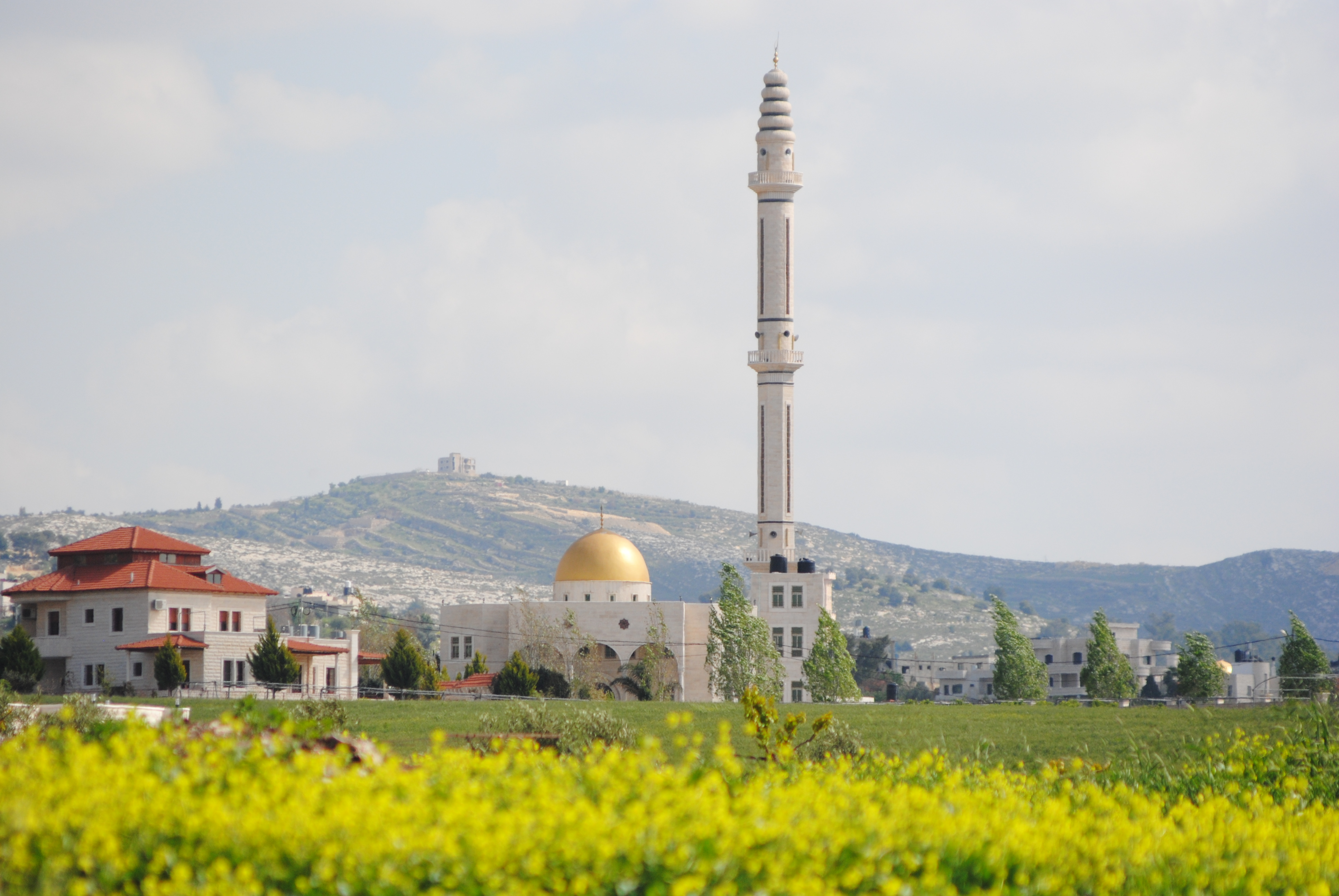
- Kharas

- Location of Kharas within Palestine
- Coordinates: 31°36′51″N 35°02′35″E
- Palestine grid: 154/113
- State: State of Palestine
- Governorate: Hebron

Government
  - Type: Municipality
  - Head of Municipality: Issa Mahmoud Abu El

Area
  - Total: 6.8 km^{2} (2.6 sq mi)

Population (2017)
  - Total: 9,139
  - Density: 1,300/km^{2} (3,500/sq mi)
- Name meaning: from personal name

Kharas (Arabic: خاراس) is a Palestinian town in the southern State of Palestine, located twelve kilometers northwest of Hebron, part of the Hebron Governorate. According to the Palestinian Central Bureau of Statistics, the town had a population of 9,139 inhabitants in 2017. It is situated at the northern mouth of the Wadi ’Arab near the ruins of 'Elah. Nearby towns include Nuba and Beit Ula to the south, Surif to the north and Halhul to the east. It has a total land area of 6,781 dunams.

== History ==
Kharas does not appear in records from the 16th century. Oral tradition suggests that Kharas was founded after the 16th century. Fellahin from Halhul established the settlement in the late 18th or early 19th century. A family from Sa'ir also relocated there due to conflicts in their hometown.

In the late Ottoman era, in 1838, Edward Robinson noted Kharas S 14° E from Bayt Nattif. It was further noted as a Muslim village, between the mountains and Gaza, but subject to the government of Hebron.

Socin found from an official Ottoman village list from about 1870 that Charas had 38 houses and a population of 120, though the population count included men, only. Hartmann found that Charas had 40 houses.

In 1883, the PEF's Survey of Western Palestine described Kharas as "a small village standing high on the side of one of the lower hills, with olives round it. On the east is a well." C.R. Conder of the PEF thought that the neighboring "thickets" or woodlands of Kharas may have been the "forest of Hereth" described in 1 Samuel 22:5, and where the fugitive king of Israel, David, hid himself from King Saul.

=== British Mandate era ===
In the 1922 census of Palestine, conducted by the British Mandate authorities, Kharas had a population of 577, all Muslim, increasing in the 1931 census to 739, still all Muslim, in 153 houses.

In the 1945 statistics the population of Kharas was 970 Muslims, and the land area 6,781 dunams of land according to an official land and population survey. 615 dunams were plantations and irrigable land, 3,532 for cereals, while 38 dunams were built-up (urban) land.

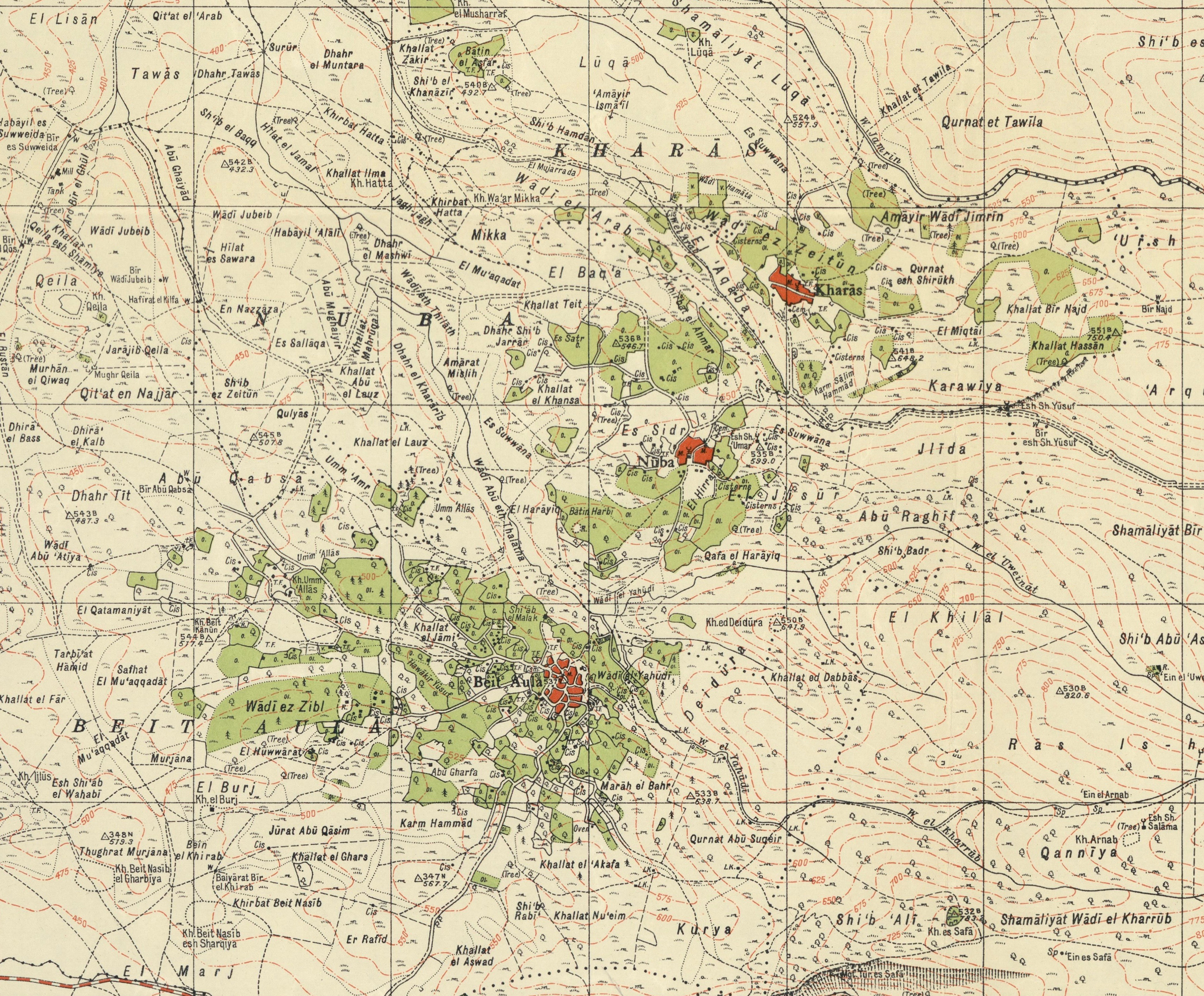
Kharas, British Mandate map, 1:20,000

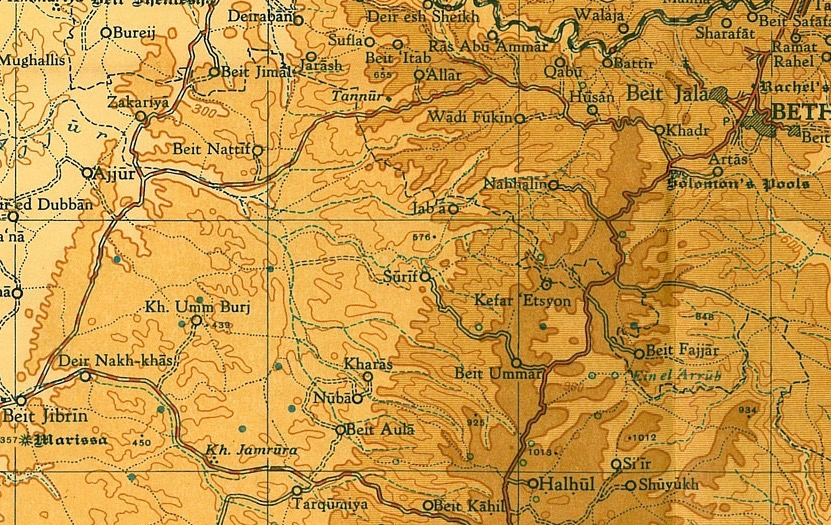
Kharas 1945 1:250,000

=== Jordanian era ===
In the wake of the 1948 Arab–Israeli War, and after the 1949 Armistice Agreements, Kharas came under Jordanian rule from 1948 until 1967. It was annexed by Jordan in 1950.

The Jordanian census of 1961 found 1,264 inhabitants in Kharas.

=== Post 1967 ===
Since the Six-Day War in 1967, Kharas has been under Israeli occupation. According to the 1967 Census, the village had a population of 1,364, of whom 101 originally came from Israeli Territory.

Israel has confiscated approximately 2,000 dunums of the village land, half of which was used for the construction of the separation wall. After completion of the wall, 600 dunums of village land will be on the Israeli side of the wall (in the Seam Zone), isolated from the village.

There are five schools in the town: a boy's secondary school, a girls' secondary school, Khaled ibn al-Walid basic mixed primary school, a girls' primary school and a mixed gender high school. There are four mosques, a sports club, a government-run health clinic and an olive press (olive oil manufacturing is a major industry in the town).

== Bibliography ==
- Barron, J.B., ed. (1923). Palestine: Report and General Abstracts of the Census of 1922. Government of Palestine.
- Conder, C.R. (1879). Tent Work in Palestine. A Record of Discovery and Adventure. Vol. 2. London: Bentley on behalf of the Palestine Exploration Fund. OCLC 23589738.
- Conder, C.R.; Kitchener, H.H. (1883). The Survey of Western Palestine: Memoirs of the Topography, Orography, Hydrography, and Archaeology. Vol. 3. London: Committee of the Palestine Exploration Fund.
- Finn, J. (1868). Byeways in Palestine. London: James Nisbett & Co.
- Government of Jordan, Department of Statistics (1964). First Census of Population and Housing. Volume I: Final Tables; General Characteristics of the Population (PDF).
- Government of Palestine, Department of Statistics (1945). Village Statistics, April, 1945.
- Hadawi, S. (1970). Village Statistics of 1945: A Classification of Land and Area ownership in Palestine. Palestine Liberation Organization Research Center. Archived from the original on 2018-12-08.
- Hartmann, M. (1883). "Die Ortschaftenliste des Liwa Jerusalem in dem türkischen Staatskalender für Syrien auf das Jahr 1288 der Flucht (1871)". Zeitschrift des Deutschen Palästina-Vereins. 6: 102–149.
- Mills, E., ed. (1932). Census of Palestine 1931. Population of Villages, Towns and Administrative Areas. Jerusalem: Government of Palestine.
- Palmer, E.H. (1881). The Survey of Western Palestine: Arabic and English Name Lists Collected During the Survey by Lieutenants Conder and Kitchener, R. E. Transliterated and Explained by E.H. Palmer. Committee of the Palestine Exploration Fund.
- Robinson, E.; Smith, E. (1841). Biblical Researches in Palestine, Mount Sinai and Arabia Petraea: A Journal of Travels in the year 1838. Vol. 2. Boston: Crocker & Brewster.
- Robinson, E.; Smith, E. (1841). Biblical Researches in Palestine, Mount Sinai and Arabia Petraea: A Journal of Travels in the year 1838. Vol. 3. Boston: Crocker & Brewster.
- Socin, A. (1879). "Alphabetisches Verzeichniss von Ortschaften des Paschalik Jerusalem". Zeitschrift des Deutschen Palästina-Vereins. 2: 135–163.
