= Mohammad Shaheen =

Jordanian professor of English literature (1938–2025)

Professor Mohammad Shaheen
- محمّد شاهين
- Born: Mohammad Youssef Shaheen (Arabic: محمّد يوسف شاهين); 1938; Halhul, Mandatory Palestine
- Died: 30 June 2025 (aged 87); Amman, Jordan
- Occupations: Academic, literary critic, translator
- Years active: 1962–2025
- Known for: English translations of Mahmoud Darwish, works on Edward Said, Transformations of Longing (Tayeb Salih), Literature and Myth
- Awards: Order of Independence (First Class) (2002); Jordanian State Award in Literature (2011); Philadelphia Award for Translation (2005); Cairo International Creativity Forum Award

Academic background
- Influences: T. S. Eliot, Ezra Pound, Edward Said, Tayeb Salih

Mohammad Youssef Shaheen (Arabic: محمّد يوسف شاهين, romanized: Muḥammad Yūsuf Shāhīn; 1938 – 30 June 2025) was a Jordanian scholar, literary critic, translator and professor of English literature. He is regarded as one of the pioneers of literary studies in Jordan.

Shaheen taught English literature at the University of Jordan from 1985 onward and published extensively in both Arabic and English. He held several key academic and administrative positions, including Chair of the English Department and editor-in-chief of Al-Majallah Al-Thaqafeyyah, the University of Jordan's cultural journal, as well as Editor-in-Chief of Mu’tah Journal for Research. In addition to his academic work, Shaheen translated selected poetry by Mahmoud Darwish into English.

Mohammad Shaheen devoted several of his scholarly works to the analysis of Edward Said’s intellectual legacy, with particular emphasis on the challenges of translating Orientalism (1978) and the resulting misinterpretations that emerged across various levels of understanding. In addition, he paid close attention to the literary contributions on Tayeb Salih, examining Season of Migration to the North (1966) through the lens of postcolonial literature. His analysis highlighted the novel’s significant impact on the development of modern Arabic narrative, both in terms of its construction of a mythologized protagonist and its innovative narrative structure.

He received numerous honors in recognition of his academic contributions, including the Order of Independence (First Class) in 2002, the State Appreciation Award in Literature in 2011, and the Philadelphia Award for Translation in 2005. Shaheen was widely known for his interest in translation and modern literary criticism, and some of his works were translated into other languages. He died on 30 June 2025 at the age of 87, after a distinguished academic career spanning over six decades.

In his administrative career, Shaheen served as Assistant to the President of the University of Jordan from 1978 to 1980. He later became Vice President of Mutah University, a post he held for four years from 1998 to 2002. Between 1985 and 1989, he also worked as an advisor at the Jordanian Ministry of Higher Education.

Shaheen took part in the Fifth Cairo International Forum for the Arabic Novel, where he was honored by Egypt’s Minister of Culture, Farouk Hosny. He also served as a member of the jury for the Third Cairo International Festival for Arabic Poetry in 2013. In a 2017 interview, Shaheen remarked that translation was among the factors contributing to the decline of modern Arabic poetry.

Shaheen earned his doctorate in English literature from the University of Cambridge, and was widely recognized for his contributions to postcolonial literary studies. Among his most notable works is the book E.M. Forster and the Politics of Imperialism.

== Early life and education ==
Mohammad Shaheen was born in 1938 in the town of Halhul, located in the Hebron Governorate of Palestine. He received his early education locally and completed his secondary education in 1958 at the Ibrahimieh School in Jerusalem. Shortly before that, he had also graduated from the Teacher Training College in Beit Hanina, also in Jerusalem. He pursued his undergraduate studies in Egypt, earning a bachelor's degree in English literature from Ain Shams University in 1962. He then traveled to the United States to continue his postgraduate education, where he obtained a Master’s degree from the University of Colorado in 1964. Subsequently, he moved to the United Kingdom and completed his doctoral studies at King's College, Cambridge, receiving a Ph.D. in English literature in 1974. This diverse academic background provided him with a deep and nuanced understanding of both Western and Arabic literature.

== Career ==
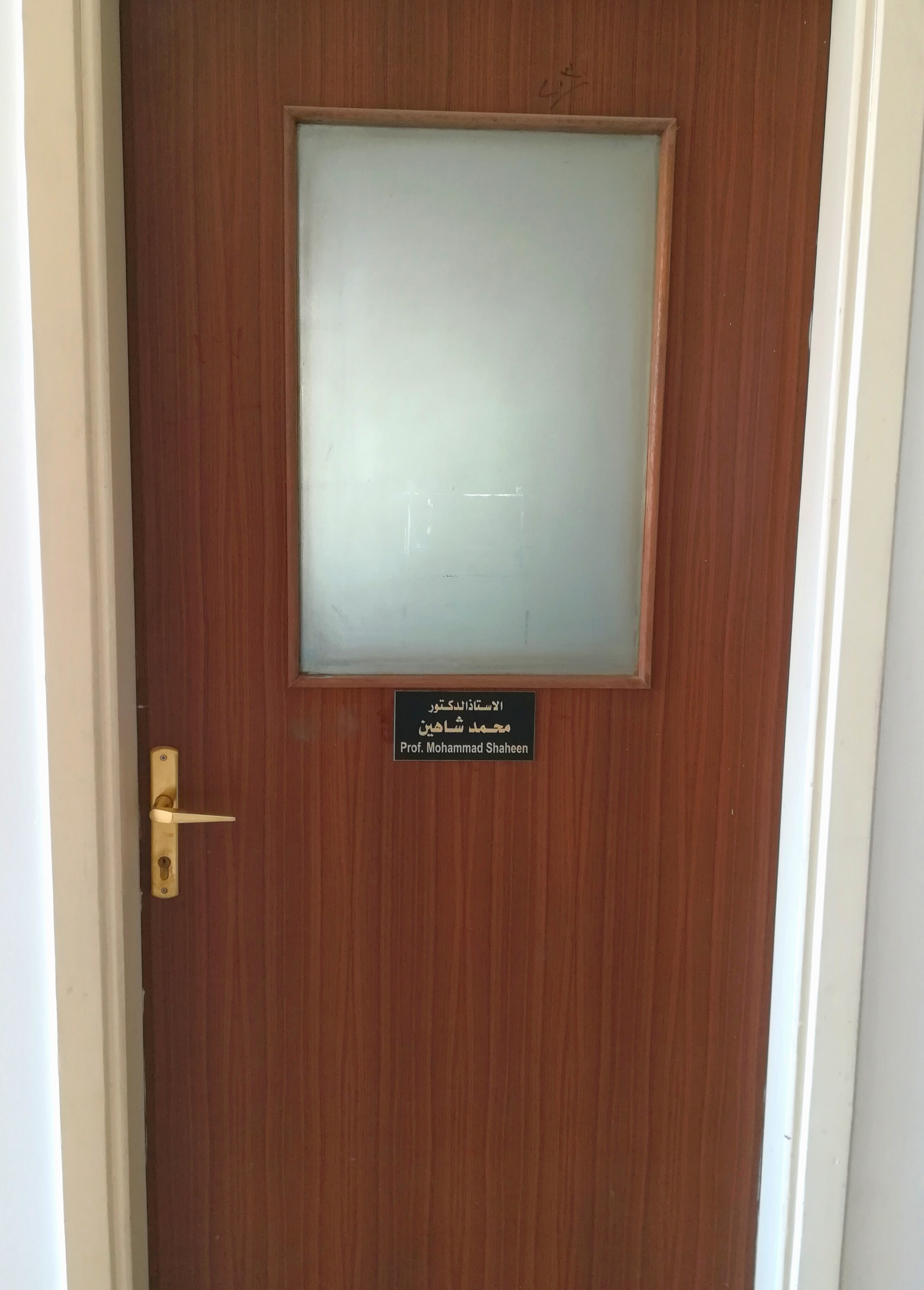
Professor Mohammad Shaheen's office at the Department of English, University of Jordan

Mohammad Shaheen began his professional career as an English teacher immediately after completing his undergraduate studies. In 1962, he taught at Beit Fajjar School and Al-Hashimiyah Secondary School in Bethlehem. After returning from the United States in 1964, he taught at the Teacher Training College in Beit Hanina, followed by a post at the Teacher Training College in Amman in 1965. In 1966, Shaheen joined the faculty at the University of Jordan, marking the beginning of a distinguished academic journey. He advanced through academic ranks and was promoted to full professor in 1985.

Throughout his decades-long tenure, Shaheen taught a wide array of undergraduate and graduate courses, including modern literary theory, literary criticism, 20th-century English literature, the novel, comparative literature, and literary translation. He was elected Chair of the Department of English at the University of Jordan’s Faculty of Foreign Languages (formerly the Faculty of Arts) twice: first from 1988 to 1989, and again from 1993 to 1995.

In addition to his academic duties, Mohammad Shaheen held several significant administrative positions. He was appointed Assistant to the President of the University of Jordan for a two-year term from 1978 to 1980, and later served as Vice President of Mutah University from 1998 to 2002.

Between 1985 and 1989, he acted as an advisor at the Ministry of Higher Education in Jordan, contributing his expertise to the development of higher education policies. Following his retirement, Shaheen was honored with the title of Professor Emeritus at the University of Jordan in recognition of his scholarly and institutional contributions. He remained academically active in his later years, notably serving as Editor-in-Chief of the Cultural Journal, a quarterly publication issued by the University of Jordan, a position he held from 2009 until his passing.

== Other activities ==
Beyond his roles in teaching and administration, Mohammad Shaheen was an active figure in both national and international literary and cultural spheres. He participated extensively in academic societies and editorial work. Since 1985, he had been a member of the Executive Committee of the International Comparative Literature Association. He also contributed to the founding and editorial leadership of several academic journals. Shaheen served as the literary editor of Dirasat, a journal published by the University of Jordan, from 1985 to 1991. During his time at Mutah University (1998–2002), he was Editor-in-Chief of Mu'tah Journal for Research. In 2008, he took on the role of Editor-in-Chief of The Cultural Journal, a quarterly issued by the University of Jordan. Internationally, he was appointed co-editor of Paideuma, a literary journal published by the University of Maine, a role he had held since 1967.

Shaheen was also involved in numerous advisory and award committees. From 2001 to 2011, he served on the Board of Trustees of the Abdulaziz Saud Al-Babtain Prize for Poetic Creativity in Kuwait. He contributed to the Bibliographic Encyclopedia of the Arabic Novel, compiled by the Department of Arabic at the American University in Cairo. In Jordan, he represented the country in the Higher Education Council of the Ministry of Education. He was also part of the Private Universities Accreditation Committee (1989), the Higher Education Policy Drafting Team (1988), and the national committee tasked with unifying English language curricula in 1989.

Shaheen's expertise extended to literary prize juries across the Arab world. He served as a jury member for Jordan’s State Appreciation Award, the Abdul Hameed Shoman Foundation Translation Prize (2005), the Sultan Bin Ali Al Owais Cultural Award in several sessions, the Sheikh Zayed Book Award for Translation (2007), and the Mahmoud Darwish Award for Creativity (2011). He was also a jury member—and later chair—of the Arab Novel Creativity Prize administered by Egypt’s Supreme Council of Culture, presiding over the 2010 cycle. Among his many contributions to translation, Shaheen is especially noted for his English translations of the poetry of Mahmoud Darwish.

In addition to his academic and critical writings, Mohammad Shaheen made significant contributions as a translator, working in both directions between Arabic and English. Among the Arabic literary works he translated into English are Emile Habibi’s The Sextet of the Six Days (Sudasiyyat al-Ayyam al-Sitta), Badr Shakir al-Sayyab’s famous poem Rain Song (Unshudat al-Matar), and a wide selection of short stories by leading Arab authors including Ghassan Kanafani, Gamal al-Ghitani, Zakaria Tamer, and Michel Aflaq, among others. His translations from English into Arabic were equally prolific and covered both poetry and prose. In modern poetry, Shaheen translated several works by Ezra Pound, including The Wanderer, The Return, and A Toast for Christmas in 1977, followed by Canto I in 1986. He also translated selected letters of the English novelist George Meredith in 1983.

Shaheen translated numerous poems by T. S. Eliot, including What the Thunder Said, The Waste Land, La Figlia Che Piange (The Weeping Girl), and Portrait of a Lady, bringing canonical works of modernist poetry to Arabic readers.

In addition to his direct translations, he also supervised, edited, or reviewed numerous translated works. Notable among them are:

- Shadows of the Future by Patrick Parrinder, translated by Bakr Abbas
- Islam in England by Nabil Matar, also translated by Bakr Abbas
- Culture and Resistance by Edward Said and David Barsamian, translated by Alaa Abu Zina
- The Question of Zion by Jacqueline Rose, translated by Mohammad Asfour

== Personal life ==
Mohammad Shaheen was of Palestinian origin; he was born and raised in Palestine before moving to Jordan, where he spent the rest of his professional life. This background shaped his work with a strong sense of cultural identity and commitment to the Palestinian cause. Throughout his career, he dedicated himself to promoting Palestinian literature and issues through translation and literary criticism. Shaheen shared a close friendship and intellectual bond with the late Palestinian poet Mahmoud Darwish. Their relationship was marked by deep mutual respect and regular collaboration. Shaheen personally translated several of Darwish’s works into English. Darwish was known to review every word of his translated poetry before publication, often meeting with Shaheen to discuss the nuances and revisions. Thanks to these efforts, Darwish’s poetry reached new audiences in the English-speaking world. Among Shaheen’s most noted translations is Almond Blossoms and Beyond (2009), the English version of Darwish’s collection Ka Zahr al-Lawz aw Ab‘ad (كزهر اللوز أو أبعد).

Shaheen also translated the writings of Edward Said into Arabic, including Culture and Resistance, a series of interviews with Said conducted by David Barsamian and published in Arabic in 2003. In addition to these translations, he produced critical studies analyzing Said’s intellectual project. Colleagues praised Shaheen’s efforts to carry the Palestinian narrative to international audiences and for reintroducing Edward Said to Arabic readers through his translations. Shaheen was widely admired for his humility and dedication to his students and colleagues. Generations of academics and translators were mentored by him and influenced by his rigorous and thoughtful approach. Intellectually active until the final years of his life, Shaheen was mourned by the academic and cultural communities in Jordan and across the Arab world as a leading figure in literature and criticism, celebrated for his lifelong commitment to scholarship and cultural dialogue.

=== Death ===
Shaheen died in Amman on 30 June 2025, at the age of 87. He was mourned by academic and cultural communities across Jordan and the Arab world. The President of the University of Jordan, Nathir Obeidat, issued a tribute, describing Shaheen as one of the university's founding scholars and a pioneering figure in English literature. Obeidat praised Shaheen’s lifelong dedication to enriching Jordanian and Arab cultural and literary life, especially through his translations of the poetry of Mahmoud Darwish and the writings of Edward Said into English and Arabic.

The funeral prayer was held on Tuesday afternoon at the mosque of the University of Jordan. He was laid to rest in the Shafa Badran cemetery in North Amman. A three-day mourning reception was held at the Abdul Hadi family hall in the Shmeisani district, attended by relatives and friends from Jordan, Palestine, and the diaspora.

== Awards and honours ==
Throughout his distinguished career, Mohammad Shaheen received numerous awards and honours in recognition of his influential contributions to literature, translation, and cultural scholarship. Some of the most notable accolades include:

- Order of Independence (First Class) in literature, awarded by the Royal Hashemite Court of Jordan in 2002.
- Jordanian State Appreciation Award in Literature (Translation category), granted by the Ministry of Culture in 2011 for his contributions to the field of literary translation.
- Philadelphia University Award for Translation (specialized and literary translation), awarded in 2005.
- Jury Shield Award at the Cairo International Short Story Forum in 2009. The prize, named after author Zakaria Tamer, was awarded during the closing ceremony in Cairo.
- A special honour at the Fifth Cairo International Forum for the Arabic Novel (circa 2005), where he was presented with the forum’s shield by Egyptian Minister of Culture Farouk Hosni in recognition of his critical contributions to modern Arabic literature.
- A medal from the National Council for Culture, Arts, and Heritage in Qatar in 2005, recognizing his support for culture and translation initiatives.
- Jury Medal from the Sheikh Zayed Book Award (Translation category), awarded in 2007 in recognition of his influential role in evaluating translated works.

== Books published ==
- The Modern Arabic Short Story: Shahrazad Returns. Palgrave Macmillan, 2 edition (22 February 2003), ISBN 0-333-64136-1, 304 pages
- George Meredith: A reappraisal of the Novels. Macmillan Press: London 1981
- Selected Letters of George Meredith. Macmillan Press: London
- E.M. Forster and the Politics of Imperialism, Palgrave Macmillan (12 August 2004), ISBN 0-333-74136-6, 256 pages
- Almond Blossoms and Beyond (translation). Interlink Publishing 2009

== Articles published ==
- George Meredith's Early Life: Ordeal and Reticence: The Modern Language Review April 1982 Vol. 77
- The Reception of Pound in Arabic: Immature response of Gibran and Bayyati: Paideuma, Vol 34
- The Arabian Nights in English Literature (book review): The Yearbook of English Studies, Vol 22
- Pickthall: New Dictionary of National Biography. Oxford, Clarenden Press, 2004
- On Meredith's Letters: American Notes and Queries, Yale 1974
- Forster on Proust: Times Literary Supplement, London 1974
- Tayeb Salih and Conrad: Comparative Literature Studies, University of Illinois, 1985
- T.L. Lawrence and Pound: Paideuma, 1988
- The Manuscript of Meredith's Last Novel: Notes and Queries, Oxford 1975
- Meredith Letter to Stephen: Notes and Queries, Oxford 1978
- Some Unpublished Hardy Letters to Gosse: Notes and Queries, Oxford 1980
- Two New Meredith Letters to Gosse: Notes and Queries, Oxford, 1980

== Resources ==
- Interlink Website
- Ministry of Culture in Jordan
