= Beit Einun =

- Municipality type D (Village council)

Arabic transcription(s)
  - Arabic: بيت عينون
  - Latin: Beit 'Einun (official); Bayt 'Anun; Khirbet Abu Rish; Bayt Aynun (unofficial)
- Location of Beit Einun within Palestine
- Coordinates: 31°33′54″N 35°07′44″E
- Palestine grid: 162/107
- State: State of Palestine
- Governorate: Hebron

Government
  - Type: Village council

Population (2017)
  - Total: 1,928
- Name meaning: Kh. Beit ’Ainûn, the ruin of the house of ’Ainûn

Beit Einun or Bayt 'Anun (Arabic: بيت عينون) is a Palestinian village in the Hebron Governorate, located five kilometers northeast of Hebron in the southern West Bank. According to the Palestinian Central Bureau of Statistics, the village had a population of 1,928 inhabitants in 2017.

The Israeli army has a major road block at Beit Einun Junction. Following the upsurge in violence from October 2015 it has been a focus of attacks against soldiers by young Palestinians. The attackers are usually shot dead. In the first two weeks of 2016 there were three separate incidents in which four young Palestinian attackers were killed; no soldiers were injured.

== History ==
=== Iron Age ===
One opinion suggests that Beit Einun is the modern site of the Biblical Beth-anoth. Another view suggests that it is the biblical site of Enam (Joshua 15:34),"a village about 2 km. from the renowned terebinth" that grew near Hebron.

=== Classical period ===
At Beit Einun, six burial caves were discovered, containing several ossuaries dating back to the 1st century CE. One of them bears an inscription in Hebrew with the word "Israel".

Several scholars suggest that the presence of the name Selacus on one of the ossuaries, which may incorporate the theophoric element "Qos", indicates the existence of a Judaized Edomite community there during the Late Roman period, several generations after the Second Temple's destruction. While these individuals had adopted Jewish customs, they still preserved a distinct identity separate from ethnic Jews.

=== Byzantine period ===
The site became populated during Byzantine rule of Palestine, and ceramics from that period has been found. Three churches were built near the center of the town sometime between the 5th and 6th centuries. The wall construction indicates rebuilding of the church in the Crusader period. Excavations have revealed a mosaic floor in the main hall of the church from the Byzantine period. It is a part of a complex building in which living quarters and storage rooms, as well as water cisterns were found. Other remains from this time period include two water cisterns, two wine-presses and several tombs.

=== Early Islamic period ===
Beit Einun is mentioned in the waqf (endowment) dedication given by the Islamic prophet Muhammad to Tamim al-Dari, a sahaba (companion). Many Muslim-built stone structures are located in the village. According to the 10th-century geographer al-Muqaddasi, Beit Einun was well known in for producing high-quality raisins called Aynuni after the village.

=== Mamluk period ===
Beit Einun was mentioned in a corpus of waqf (religious endowment)-related documents from the Mamluk period (1260–1516) stored in Jerusalem; the waqf generally concerned agricultural revenues for the benefit of the Haram al-Sharif (Temple Mount) in Jerusalem and the Ibrahimi Mosque (Cave of the Patriarchs) in Hebron. The document, dating to the first decade of the 14th century, named men from Beit Einun and nearby Halhul, including from the al-Abbas clan, as guarantors of the peace in the nearby village of Nuba.

=== Ottoman period ===
The village was incorporated into the Ottoman Empire in 1517 with all of Palestine, and in 1596 Beit Einun appeared in Ottoman tax registers as being in the nahiya of Hebron of the liwa of Jerusalem. It had a population of 18 Muslim households, and paid taxes on wheat, barley, vineyards, fruit trees, occasional revenues, goats and/or bee hives.

In 1838 Edward Robinson noted it in ruins. In July 1863 the French explorer Victor Guérin visited the place, called Khirbet Beit-A'noun. He inspected the ruins, and dated them to the Byzantine era. In 1883 the PEF's Survey of Palestine found here "walls, foundations, and a reservoir. There is a spring to the wast, and on the south a small ruined chapel; the walls and pillar-chafts remaining; this is called el Keniseh. Remains of a tower with large drafted masonry also exist; it measures 82 feet north and south by 72 feet east and west. The stones are in some cases 6 feet long and 3 feet high."

== Geography ==
Beit Einun is situated in the 'Anun Valley, at the bottom of a hill in the Judea region, forming the beginning of a fertile plain cultivated with vines and grains. There are terraces on the higher slopes of the hill to prevent erosion. These small separate fields are planted with grape and tomato vines, plum and almond orchards. Beit Einun is located just five kilometers north of Hebron. Other nearby localities include, Sa'ir and ash-Shuyukh to the northeast, Halhul to the northwest, Beit Kahil to the west and Ras Abu Risha to the southeast.

== Demographics ==
Beit Einun's population drastically decreased after the Six-Day War in 1967, from 4,967 to just a few hundred residents. Most of the inhabitants left for Jordan. In the 1997 census by the Palestinian Central Bureau of Statistics (PCBS), Beit Einun had a population of 1,748. The gender make-up was 906 males and 842 females. Palestinian refugees constituted 15.6% of the village's inhabitants. In 2004, Beit Einun had a population of 2,277 inhabitants, rising to 2,439 in 2006 according to PCBS estimates. However, the PCBS 2007 census revealed that Beit Einun had 1,809 inhabitants.

== Bibliography ==
- Conder, C.R.; Kitchener, H.H. (1883). The Survey of Western Palestine: Memoirs of the Topography, Orography, Hydrography, and Archaeology. Vol. 3. London: Committee of the Palestine Exploration Fund.
- Dauphin, C. (1998). La Palestine byzantine, Peuplement et Populations. BAR International Series 726 (in French). Vol. III : Catalogue. Oxford: Archeopress. ISBN 0-860549-05-4.
- Government of Jordan, Department of Statistics (1964). First Census of Population and Housing. Volume I: Final Tables; General Characteristics of the Population (PDF).
- Guérin, V. (1869). Description Géographique Historique et Archéologique de la Palestine (in French). Vol. 1: Judee, pt. 3. Paris: L'Imprimerie Nationale.
- Hütteroth, W.-D.; Abdulfattah, K. (1977). Historical Geography of Palestine, Transjordan and Southern Syria in the Late 16th Century. Erlanger Geographische Arbeiten, Sonderband 5. Erlangen, Germany: Vorstand der Fränkischen Geographischen Gesellschaft. ISBN 3-920405-41-2.
- Le Strange, G. (1890). Palestine Under the Moslems: A Description of Syria and the Holy Land from A.D. 650 to 1500. Committee of the Palestine Exploration Fund.
- Rapoport, Yossef (2025). Becoming Arab: The Formation of Arab Identity in the Medieval Middle East. Princeton: Princeton University Press. ISBN 9780691210636.
- Palmer, E.H. (1881). The Survey of Western Palestine: Arabic and English Name Lists Collected During the Survey by Lieutenants Conder and Kitchener, R. E. Transliterated and Explained by E.H. Palmer. Committee of the Palestine Exploration Fund.
- Pringle, D. (1997). Secular buildings in the Crusader Kingdom of Jerusalem: an archaeological Gazetter. Cambridge University Press. ISBN 0521-46010-7.
- Robinson, E.; Smith, E. (1841). Biblical Researches in Palestine, Mount Sinai and Arabia Petraea: A Journal of Travels in the year 1838. Vol. 2. Boston: Crocker & Brewster.
- Robinson, E.; Smith, E. (1841). Biblical Researches in Palestine, Mount Sinai and Arabia Petraea: A Journal of Travels in the year 1838. Vol. 3. Boston: Crocker & Brewster.
- Toledano, E. (1984). "The Sanjaq of Jerusalem in the Sixteenth Century: Aspects of Topography and Population". Archivum Ottomanicum. 9: 279–319. Archived from the original on 2016-03-05.
- Wheatley, P. (2001). The Places Where Men Pray Together : Cities in Islamic Lands, Seventh through the Tenth Centuries. Chicago: University of Chicago Press. ISBN 0226894282.
