= Khirbet Kuwayzibah =

Kuzibah

Arabic transcription(s)
  - Arabic: كوزيبا
- Location of Kuzibah within the West Bank Location of Sa'ir within Palestine
- Coordinates: 31°36′1″N 35°09′25″E
- Palestine grid: 164/112
- State: State of Palestine
- Governorate: Hebron

Government
  - Type: Municipality

Population (2017)
  - Total: 1,383
- Name meaning: the ruin of Kuzeiba, p.n., possibly from the Heb. Chozeba

Kuwayzibah
- كوزيبا (Arabic)
- Kūzībah (ar)
- Interactive map of Kuwayzibah
- Periods: Second Temple period

Site notes
- Height: 872 m (2,861 ft)

Khirbet Kuwayzibah (Arabic: كوزيبا, Hebrew: ח'רבת כויזבה), also Kuzibah, Kueiziba, is an ancient ruin, partly inhabited, in the Hebron Governorate in the West Bank, presently part of Sa'ir. The modern Palestinian village had a population of 1,383 in 2017.

== Etymology ==
Edward Henry Palmer noted in 1881 that Khurbet Kueiziba could possibly be a modern derivation of the Hebrew placename Chozeba.

== History ==
The site is dated to classic antiquity, and usually identified with Chozeba, also Kuseva (Hebrew: כוסבה) - the place of origin of Simon Bar Kokhba. At the foot of the ruin are several springs, known as 'Ain Kueiziba, along which are the remains of ancient pools. These springs are the source of water for the Arrub aqueduct, which together with other aqueduct supplied the water to the Roman aqueduct to Jerusalem.

In 2009, several residents of Kuwayzibah were interviewed for a Channel 1 article about Tzvi Misinai and admitted they are of Jewish descent.

== See also ==
- Betar (fortress)

== Bibliography ==
- Conder, C.R.; Kitchener, H.H. (1883). The Survey of Western Palestine: Memoirs of the Topography, Orography, Hydrography, and Archaeology. Vol. 3. London: Committee of the Palestine Exploration Fund. (pp. 312-313, 358)
- Palmer, E.H. (1881). The Survey of Western Palestine: Arabic and English Name Lists Collected During the Survey by Lieutenants Conder and Kitchener, R. E. Transliterated and Explained by E.H. Palmer. Committee of the Palestine Exploration Fund.
