= Kukkar Hatta =

Coordinates: 30°22′45″N 71°39′40″E

Kukkar Hatta is a town situated 12 km west of the Kabirwala with link road on canal bank of Sidhnai in Kabirwala Tehsil, and 10 km north on pull rangho with link road'north east to Multan about 50 km in Khanewal District in the Province of Punjab, Pakistan. There is a rest house of Irrigation Department which is 150 years old.
