= Beit Ula =

Beit Ulla بيت أولا
- Municipality type B

Arabic transcription(s)
  - Arabic: بيت أولا
  - Latin: Beit Ulla (official); Bayt Aula (unofficial)
- Location of Beit Ulla within Palestine
- Coordinates: 31°35′46″N 35°01′44″E
- Palestine grid: 152/111
- State: State of Palestine
- Governorate: Hebron

Government
  - Type: Municipality

Area
  - Total: 22.4 km^{2} (8.6 sq mi)

Population (2017)
  - Total: 14,537
  - Density: 649/km^{2} (1,680/sq mi)
- Name meaning: The house of Aula

Beit Ula, Beit Aula, (Arabic: بيت أولا) is a Palestinian town in the Hebron Governorate of the State of Palestine, located ten kilometers northwest of Hebron, in the southern West Bank.

== Location ==
Beit Ula is located 10 kilometers (6.2 mi) (horizontally) on the highlands north-west of Hebron. It is bordered by Nuba to the north, Umm 'Allas to the west, and Tarqumiyah to the south. The valley of el-Yehudi ("valley of the Jews"), also known in Hebrew as the Nahal haEla ("Ela stream"), lies to the east.

== History ==
=== Biblical and Talmudic connection ===
The PEF's Survey of Western Palestine (SWP) suggested several possible Biblical and Talmudic connections.

=== Ottoman period ===
While Beit Ula was mentioned in lists from the early part of the 16th century, there is no evidence of settlement in the second half of the 16th century. However, it was resettled at a later period. Its residents originated in the nearby Beit Nazzib (PAL 150/110) and Beit Kanun (151/111), today part of Um 'Alas, a neighborhood of Beit Ulla). It became a regional center in the 19th century.

In the Ottoman census of 932 AH/1525-1526 CE, Bayt Awla was noted as mazraa land, that is cultivated land, located in the nahiya of Halil.

In 1838, Edward Robinson noted Beit Ula as a Muslim village, between the mountains and Gaza, but subject to the government of Hebron. It was one of a cluster of villages at the foot of a mountain, together with Kharas and Nuba.

Socin, citing an official Ottoman village list compiled around 1870, noted that Betula, located north east of Tarqumiyah, had 51 houses and a population of 207, though the population count included men, only. Hartmann found that Bet Ula had 80 houses.

In 1883 the PEF's Survey of Western Palestine (SWP) described Beit Aula as "a small village standing on a spur surrounded with olives. It has a well on the west in the valley, a mile away.”

=== British Mandate ===
In the 1922 census of Palestine, conducted by the British Mandate authorities, Beit Ula had a population of 825 inhabitants, all Muslims, increasing in the 1931 census to 1,045, still entirely Muslim, in 217 inhabited houses. In the latter census it was counted with Kh. Beit Kanun, Kh. Hawala and Kh. Tawas.

In the 1945 statistics the population of Beit Ula was 1,310 Muslims, and the total land area was 24,045 dunams of land according to an official land and population survey. Of this, 1,324 dunams were plantations and irrigable land, 8,747 were for cereals, while 71 dunams were built-up (urban) land.

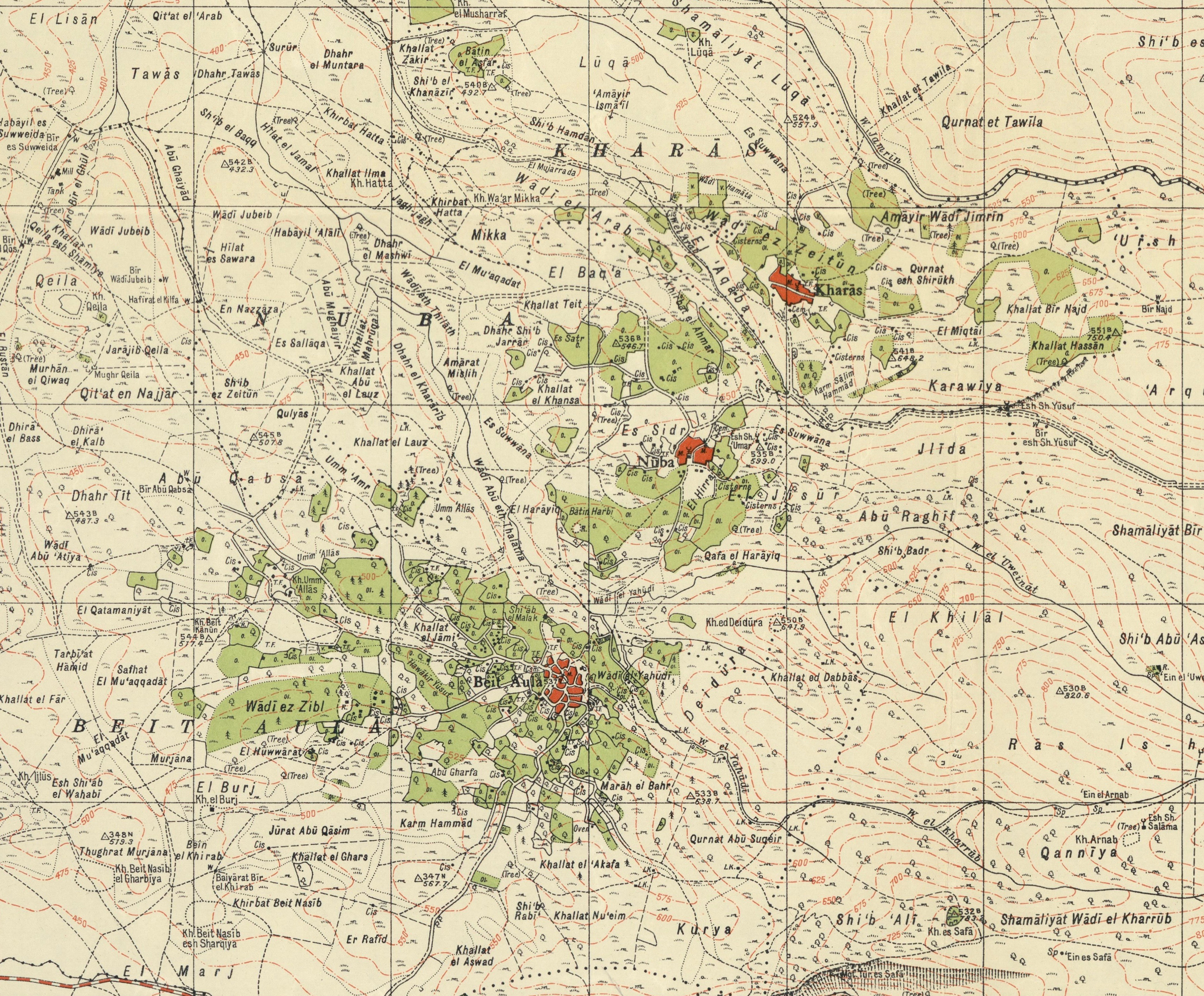
Beit Ula (Beit Aula), British Mandate map, 1:20,000

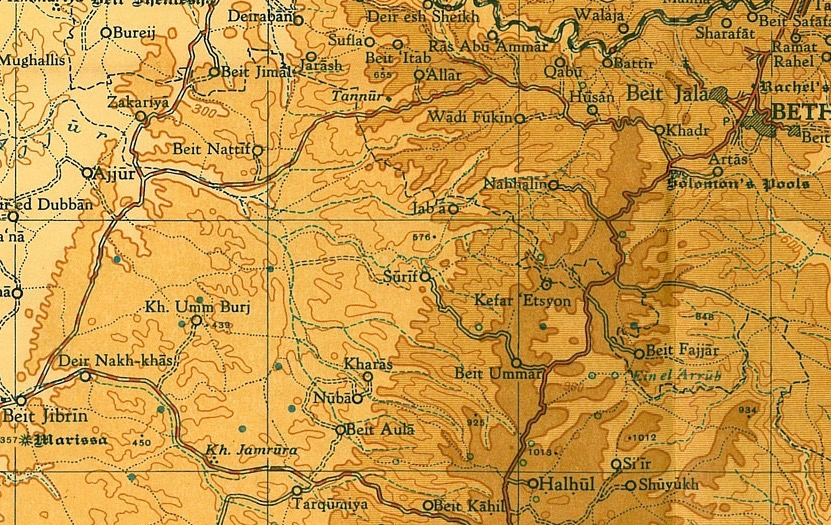
Beit Ula (Beit Aula) 1945 1:250,000

=== Jordanian rule ===
In the wake of the 1948 Arab–Israeli War, and after the 1949 Armistice Agreements, Beit Ula came under Jordanian rule. It was annexed by Jordan in 1950.

In 1961, the population of Beit Aula was 1,677.

=== Post-1967 ===
Since the Six-Day War in 1967, Beit Ula has been under Israeli occupation.

According to the Palestinian Central Bureau of Statistics, the town had a population of 10,885 inhabitants in 2007. The town had a population of 14,537 in 2017.

Beit Ula has a total land area of 22,432 dunams, of which 74.5% is located in Area B (Palestinian National Authority (PNA) is in control of civil affairs and Israel's responsible for security) and 25.5% is located in Area C (complete Israeli control).

== Bibliography ==
- Barron, J.B., ed. (1923). Palestine: Report and General Abstracts of the Census of 1922. Government of Palestine.
- Conder, C.R.; Kitchener, H.H. (1883). The Survey of Western Palestine: Memoirs of the Topography, Orography, Hydrography, and Archaeology. Vol. 3. London: Committee of the Palestine Exploration Fund.
- Government of Jordan, Department of Statistics (1964). First Census of Population and Housing. Volume I: Final Tables; General Characteristics of the Population (PDF).
- Government of Palestine, Department of Statistics (1945). Village Statistics, April, 1945.
- Hadawi, S. (1970). Village Statistics of 1945: A Classification of Land and Area ownership in Palestine. Palestine Liberation Organization Research Center.
- Hartmann, M. (1883). "Die Ortschaftenliste des Liwa Jerusalem in dem türkischen Staatskalender für Syrien auf das Jahr 1288 der Flucht (1871)". Zeitschrift des Deutschen Palästina-Vereins. 6: 102–149.
- Mills, E., ed. (1932). Census of Palestine 1931. Population of Villages, Towns and Administrative Areas. Jerusalem: Government of Palestine.
- Palmer, E.H. (1881). The Survey of Western Palestine: Arabic and English Name Lists Collected During the Survey by Lieutenants Conder and Kitchener, R. E. Transliterated and Explained by E.H. Palmer. Committee of the Palestine Exploration Fund.
- Robinson, E.; Smith, E. (1841). Biblical Researches in Palestine, Mount Sinai and Arabia Petraea: A Journal of Travels in the year 1838. Vol. 2. Boston: Crocker & Brewster.
- Robinson, E.; Smith, E. (1841). Biblical Researches in Palestine, Mount Sinai and Arabia Petraea: A Journal of Travels in the year 1838. Vol. 3. Boston: Crocker & Brewster.
- Socin, A. (1879). "Alphabetisches Verzeichniss von Ortschaften des Paschalik Jerusalem". Zeitschrift des Deutschen Palästina-Vereins. 2: 135–163.
- Toledano, E. (1984). "The Sanjaq of Jerusalem in the Sixteenth Century: Aspects of Topography and Population". Archivum Ottomanicum. 9: 279–319. Archived from the original on 2016-03-05.
