= Nuba, Hebron =

Nuba نوبا
- Municipality type C

Arabic transcription(s)
  - Arabic: نوبا
- Location of Nuba within Palestine
- Coordinates: 31°36′26″N 35°02′12″E
- Palestine grid: 153/112
- State: State of Palestine
- Governorate: Hebron

Government
  - Type: Municipality

Population (2017)
  - Total: 5,631
- Name meaning: probably meaning "a top"

Nuba (Arabic: نوبا) is a Palestinian town located eleven kilometers north-west of Hebron.The town is in the Hebron Governorate of the State of Palestine, in the southern West Bank. According to the Palestinian Central Bureau of Statistics, the village had a population of 5,631 in 2017.

== History ==
=== Mamluk period ===
Nuba is mentioned in three waqf (religious endowment) documents dating to the first decade of the 14th century, during Mamluk rule in Palestine (1260–1516). The waqf concerned revenues from the village for the benefit of the Ibrahimi Mosque in Hebron and provide information about the residents of Nuba. In one of the documents, three ru'asa (sing: ra'is; headmen), all belonging to a family called the Banu Amir, recognize their duties to forward grain revenue to the waqf and guarantee each other's obligations. In the second document, dated to July 1306, four ru'asa of Nuba swear to the governor of Jerusalem to act lawfully, keep the peace between themselves, and cultivate the village lands belonging to the waqf. Thirteen men, some from clans called al-Abbas and al-Ghazi, from the nearby villages of Halhul, Tarqumiya, Beit Ula, Beit Einun and Nuba's satellite village of Beit Nasif all agreed to ensure the peace in Nuba, indicating there had been persistent strife in the village prompting intervention. The third document, dating to 1307, orders three villagers of Nuba, all members of the Banu Amir but not ru'asa, to act lawfully and not engage in mischief.

=== Ottoman era ===
Nuba, like the rest of Palestine, was incorporated into the Ottoman Empire in 1516, and in a tax register from 1596, the village was listed as part of the nahiya (subdistrict) of Hebron in the liwa of Jerusalem. It had a population of 82 Muslim households. The villagers paid a fixed tax rate of 25% on wheat, barley, vineyards and fruit trees, occasional revenues, goats and/or beehives; a total of 10,000 akçe.

In 1838, the biblical scholar Edward Robinson noted Nuba as a Muslim village between the mountains and Gaza, and administratively attached to Hebron. It was one of a cluster of villages at the foot of a mountain, together with Kharas and Beit Ula. An Ottoman village list from c. 1870 showed that Nuba had 52 houses and a population of 200, though the population count only included men. In 1883, PEF's Survey of Western Palestine described Nuba as a "small village perched on a low hill, with a well about a mile to the east." In 1896 the population of Nuba was estimated to be about 537.

=== British Mandate period ===
In the 1922 census of Palestine conducted by the British Mandate authorities, Nuba had a population 357, all Muslims. This had increased at the time of the 1931 census to 611 Muslims, living in 140 houses. In the 1945 statistics the population of Nuba was 760, all Muslims, who owned 22,836 dunams of land according to an official land and population survey. 403 dunams were plantations and irrigable land, 10,116 for cereals, while 33 dunams were built-up (urban) land.

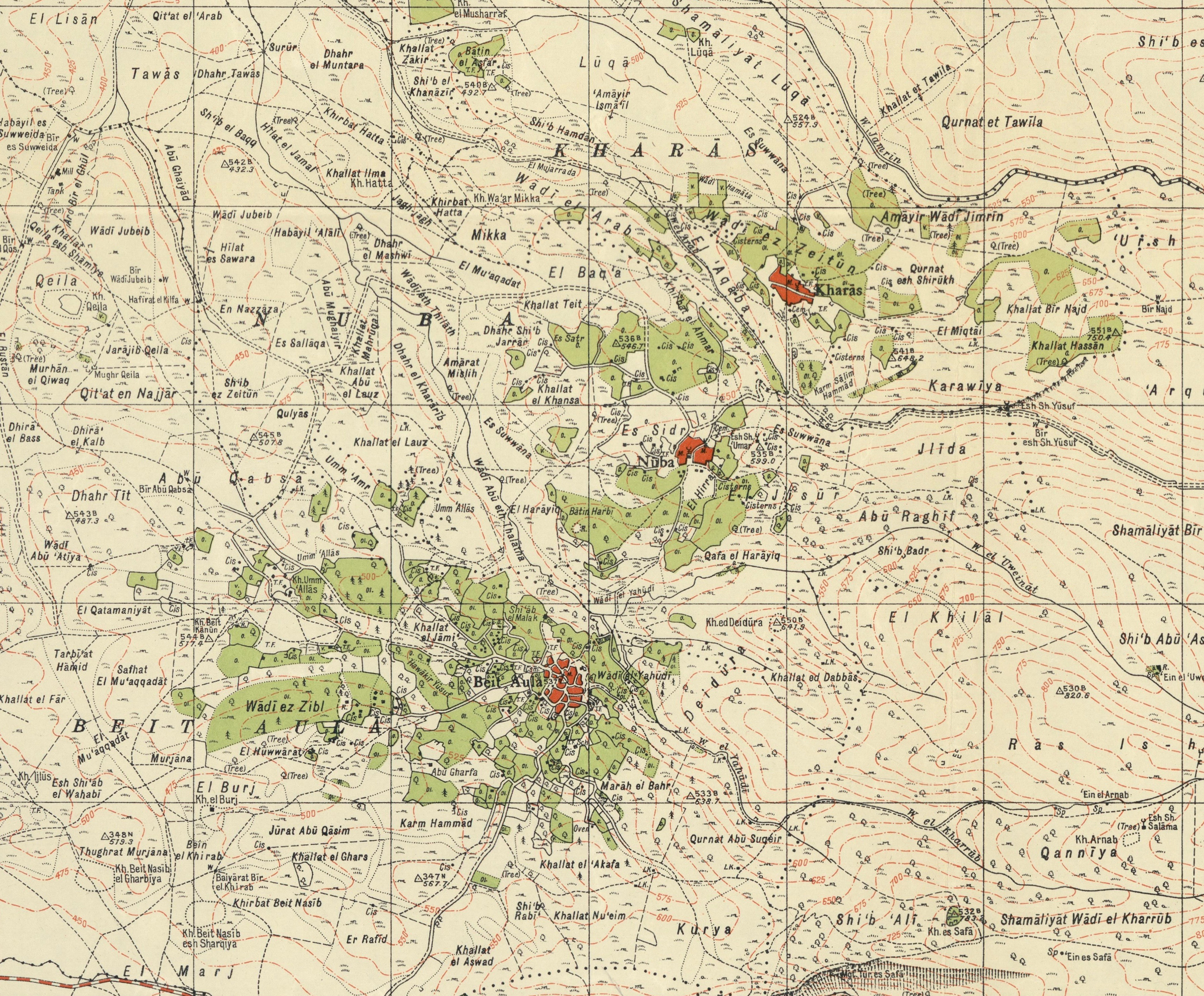
Nuba, British Mandate map, 1:20,000

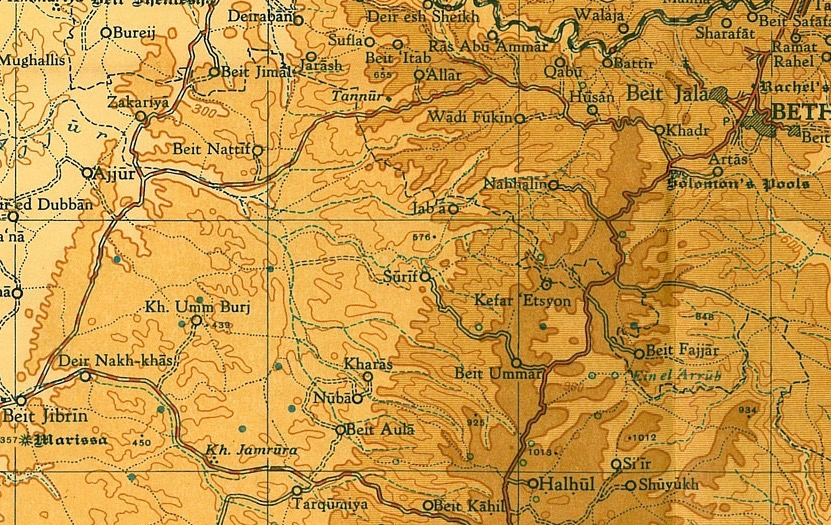
Nuba 1945 1:250,000

=== Jordanian period ===
In the wake of the 1948 Arab–Israeli War, and after the 1949 Armistice Agreements, Nuba came under Jordanian rule. The Jordanian census of 1961 found 1,075 inhabitants in Nuba.

=== Post-1967 ===
Since the Six-Day War in 1967, Nuba has been under Israeli occupation.

== Notable people ==
- Abdulrahim Abu-Husayn, a Palestinian historian.

== Bibliography ==
- Barron, J. B., ed. (1923). Palestine: Report and General Abstracts of the Census of 1922. Government of Palestine.
- Conder, C.R.; Kitchener, H.H. (1883). The Survey of Western Palestine: Memoirs of the Topography, Orography, Hydrography, and Archaeology. Vol. 3. London: Committee of the Palestine Exploration Fund.
- Government of Jordan, Department of Statistics (1964). First Census of Population and Housing. Volume I: Final Tables; General Characteristics of the Population (PDF).
- Government of Palestine, Department of Statistics (1945). Village Statistics, April, 1945.
- Hadawi, S. (1970). Village Statistics of 1945: A Classification of Land and Area ownership in Palestine. Palestine Liberation Organization Research Center.
- Hartmann, M. (1883). "Die Ortschaftenliste des Liwa Jerusalem in dem türkischen Staatskalender für Syrien auf das Jahr 1288 der Flucht (1871)". Zeitschrift des Deutschen Palästina-Vereins. 6: 102–149.
- Hütteroth, W.-D.; Abdulfattah, K. (1977). Historical Geography of Palestine, Transjordan and Southern Syria in the Late 16th Century. Erlanger Geographische Arbeiten, Sonderband 5. Erlangen, Germany: Vorstand der Fränkischen Geographischen Gesellschaft. ISBN 3-920405-41-2.
- Mills, E., ed. (1932). Census of Palestine 1931. Population of Villages, Towns and Administrative Areas. Jerusalem: Government of Palestine.
- Palmer, E.H. (1881). The Survey of Western Palestine: Arabic and English Name Lists Collected During the Survey by Lieutenants Conder and Kitchener, R. E. Transliterated and Explained by E.H. Palmer. Committee of the Palestine Exploration Fund.
- Rapoport, Yossef (2025). Becoming Arab: The Formation of Arab Identity in the Medieval Middle East. Princeton: Princeton University Press. ISBN 9780691210636.
- Robinson, E.; Smith, E. (1841a). Biblical Researches in Palestine, Mount Sinai and Arabia Petraea: A Journal of Travels in the year 1838. Vol. 2. Boston: Crocker & Brewster.
- Robinson, E.; Smith, E. (1841b). Biblical Researches in Palestine, Mount Sinai and Arabia Petraea: A Journal of Travels in the year 1838. Vol. 3. Boston: Crocker & Brewster.
- Schick, C. (1896). "Zur Einwohnerzahl des Bezirks Jerusalem". Zeitschrift des Deutschen Palästina-Vereins. 19: 120–127.
- Singer, A. (1994). Palestinian peasants and Ottoman officials: rural administration around sixteenth-century Jerusalem (3rd, illustrated ed.). Cambridge University Press. ISBN 0-521-47679-8.
- Socin, A. (1879). "Alphabetisches Verzeichniss von Ortschaften des Paschalik Jerusalem". Zeitschrift des Deutschen Palästina-Vereins. 2: 135–163.
