= Hamis Hatta =

Timorese politician and independence activist

Hamis Hatta was a Timorese politician and independence activist. He was a member of Fretilin National Committee.
