= Al-Shuyukh =

Ash-Shuyukh الشيوخ
- Municipality type C

Arabic transcription(s)
  - Arabic: الشيوخ
  - Latin: Al-Shuyukh (official)
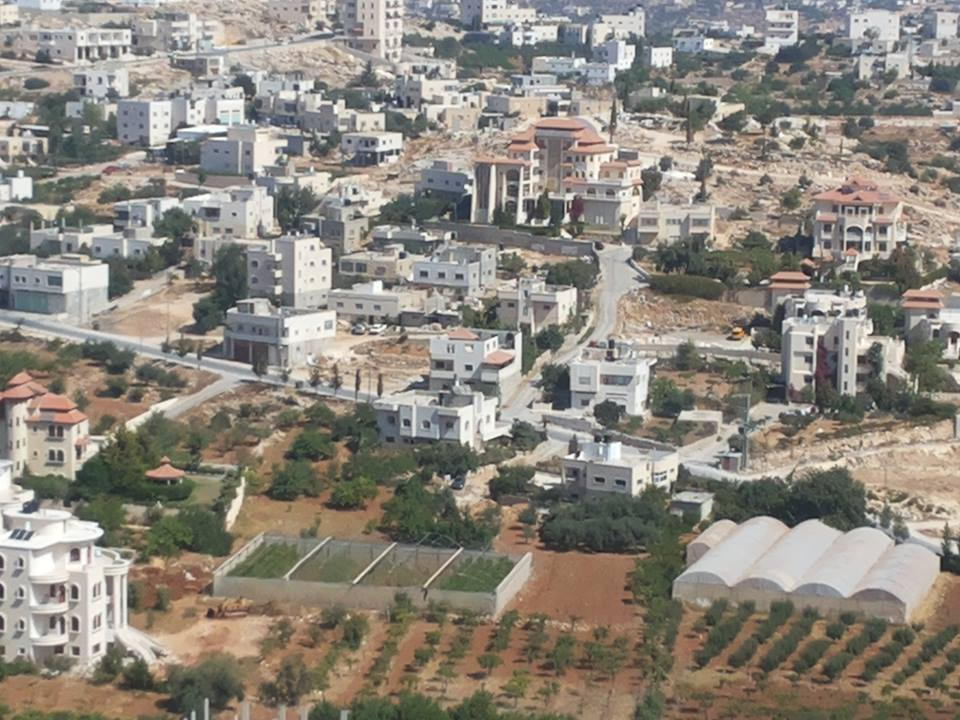
- Ash-Shuyukh

- Location of Ash-Shuyukh within Palestine
- Coordinates: 31°34′11″N 35°09′20″E
- Palestine grid: 164/109
- State: State of Palestine
- Governorate: Hebron

Government
  - Type: Municipality

Area
  - Total: 22.1 km^{2} (8.5 sq mi)

Population (2017)
  - Total: 12,052
  - Density: 545/km^{2} (1,410/sq mi)
- Name meaning: The Sheiks/ Shyoukhi

Ash-Shuyukh or al-Shuyukh (Arabic: الشيوخ) is a Palestinian town in the Hebron Governorate of the State of Palestine, located 6 km northeast of the city of Hebron. According to the Palestinian Central Bureau of Statistics, Ash-Shuyukh had a population of 12,052 in 2017.

Like the rest of the Hebron area, ash-Shuyukh is an agricultural area. Primary crops include olives, figs, almonds, lentils, peaches and apricots. Olive groves cover 980 dunams while grains and pulses cover 680 dunams. There are about 2,000 sheep and goats in the town raised as livestock.

== History ==
=== Ottoman era ===
During the Ottoman era, in 1838, Edward Robinson noted esh-Shiyukh as “a well built village”.

French explorer Victor Guérin visited in 1863, and noted that the village was situated on a high rocky hill. It had 200 inhabitants and a small mosque dedicated to a "Cheikh Ibrahim el-Hedmi."

An Ottoman village list of about 1870 counted 33 houses and a population of 99 in Schijuch, though the population count included men only.

In 1883, the PEF's Survey of Western Palestine described it as a "well-built village standing high, and visible from Tekua. There are a few trees round it, and caves. The water supply is from cisterns, and there is a spring to the north."

=== British Mandate era ===
In the 1922 census of Palestine conducted by the British Mandate authorities, 'Al Shiukh had a population 792 inhabitants, all Muslims. This had increased at the time of the 1931 census to 925 Muslims, in 180 inhabited houses.

The first school was established in 1940 by Mohammed Mahmoud Eid.

In the 1945 statistics the population of Ash-Shuyukh was 1,240, all Muslims, who owned 22,091 dunams of land according to an official land and population survey. 1,713 dunams were plantations and irrigable land, 3,365 for cereals, while 24 dunams were built-up (urban) land.

=== Jordanian Era ===
In the wake of the 1948 Arab–Israeli War, and after the 1949 Armistice Agreements, Ash-Shuyukh came under Jordanian rule It was annexed by Jordan in 1950.

The Jordanian census of 1961 found 1,660 inhabitants in Shuyukh.

=== Post 1967 ===
Since the Six-Day War in 1967, Ash-Shuyukh has been under Israeli occupation.

In 1986, Grossman wrote that the locals were landless, impoverished Dervishes, with some of them originating from the Ashkelon area.

Another school was built in 2002 and named in honor of a resident killed during the al-Aqsa Intifada.

== Notable people ==
- Hamdan Taha, Palestinian archaeologist

== Bibliography ==
- Barron, J.B., ed. (1923). Palestine: Report and General Abstracts of the Census of 1922. Government of Palestine.
- Conder, C.R.; Kitchener, H.H. (1883). The Survey of Western Palestine: Memoirs of the Topography, Orography, Hydrography, and Archaeology. Vol. 3. London: Committee of the Palestine Exploration Fund.
- Government of Jordan, Department of Statistics (1964). First Census of Population and Housing. Volume I: Final Tables; General Characteristics of the Population (PDF).
- Government of Palestine, Department of Statistics (1945). Village Statistics, April, 1945.
- Guérin, V. (1869). Description Géographique Historique et Archéologique de la Palestine (in French). Vol. 1: Judee, pt. 3. Paris: L'Imprimerie Nationale.
- Hadawi, S. (1970). Village Statistics of 1945: A Classification of Land and Area ownership in Palestine. Palestine Liberation Organization Research Centre.
- Hartmann, M. (1883). "Die Ortschaftenliste des Liwa Jerusalem in dem türkischen Staatskalender für Syrien auf das Jahr 1288 der Flucht (1871)". Zeitschrift des Deutschen Palästina-Vereins. 6: 102–149.
- Mills, E., ed. (1932). Census of Palestine 1931. Population of Villages, Towns and Administrative Areas. Jerusalem: Government of Palestine.
- Palmer, E.H. (1881). The Survey of Western Palestine: Arabic and English Name Lists Collected During the Survey by Lieutenants Conder and Kitchener, R. E. Transliterated and Explained by E.H. Palmer. Committee of the Palestine Exploration Fund.
- Robinson, E.; Smith, E. (1841). Biblical Researches in Palestine, Mount Sinai and Arabia Petraea: A Journal of Travels in the year 1838. Vol. 2. Boston: Crocker & Brewster. (p. 185)
- Socin, A. (1879). "Alphabetisches Verzeichniss von Ortschaften des Paschalik Jerusalem". Zeitschrift des Deutschen Palästina-Vereins. 2: 135–163.
