= Khashem al-Daraj =

Village in Hebron Governorate, Palestine

Khashem al-Daraj Arabic: خشم الدرج
- Khashem al-Daraj
- Location of Khashem al-Daraj within Palestine
- Coordinates: 31°25′39″N 35°14′35″E
- Country: Palestine
- Governorate: Hebron Governorate
- Elevation: 553 m (1,814 ft)

Population (2017)
  - Total: 989

Khashem al-Daraj is a Palestinian village located in the Hebron Governorate in the southern West Bank. It lies in the far southeast of the town of Yatta.

== Geography ==
Khashem al-Daraj is located approximately 40 kilometres southeast of the city of Hebron, at an elevation of about 553 metres above sea level. It is bordered to the east by the Dead Sea and to the south by the village of An-Najada.

== Population ==
Khashem al-Daraj is administered by the Khashem al-Daraj Village Council. According to the Palestinian Central Bureau of Statistics, the village had a population of approximately 989 in the 2017 census.

== See also ==
- Hebron Governorate
