= An-Najada, Hebron =

Village in Hebron Governorate, Palestine

An-Najada, Hebron Arabic: (النجادة (الخليل
- An-Najada, Hebron
- Location of An-Najada, Hebron within Palestine
- Coordinates: 31°24′31″N 35°12′21″E
- Country: Palestine
- Governorate: Hebron Governorate
- Elevation: 530 m (1,740 ft)

Population (2007)
  - Total: 413

An-Najada is a Palestinian village located in the Hebron Governorate in the southern West Bank.

== Geography ==
An-Najada is situated at an elevation of approximately 530 meters above sea level. It is located about 19 kilometers southeast of the city of Hebron. The village is bordered to the east by the Dead Sea and to the west by Yatta, Hebron.

== Population ==
According to the 2007 census conducted by the Palestinian Central Bureau of Statistics, An-Najada had a population of approximately 413.

== See also ==
- Dura, Hebron
- Hebron Governorate
