= Wadi Qana =

Valley and stream in Palestine and Israel

Wadi Qana/Kana brook Kanah (biblical)
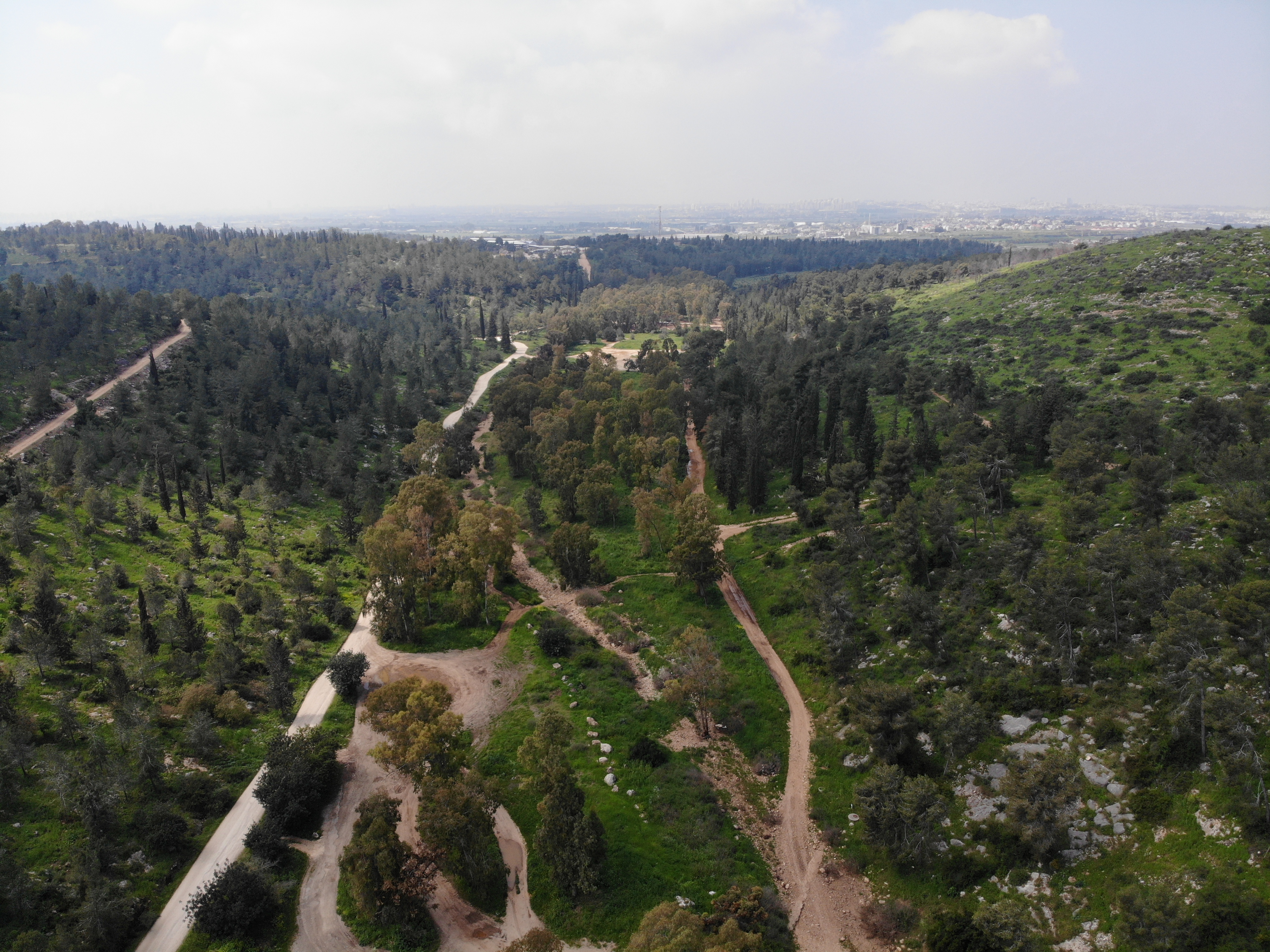
- Wadi Qana, aerial view
- Native name: Wādī Qānā (Arabic); Nahal Qana (Hebrew)

Location
- Country: Palestine, Israel

Physical characteristics
- Source: near Huwara
  - location: south of Nablus, West Bank
- Mouth: Yarkon River
  - location: Jaljulia, Central District
  - coordinates: 32°7′37.32″N 34°53′43.48″E

Wadi Qana (Arabic: وادي قانا, romanized: wādī qānā, Hebrew: נחל קנה, romanized: Nahal Qana) (Note: qānāh – reed or stalk generally but as a marsh plant it appears to be specifically here a variety either of Arundo or Phragmites. – comes from a Canaanite root (qāneh), cf. Akkadian qanū, signifying 'reed', ancient Greek κάννα (pole reed). The names of many streams in the Bible, such as Qana/Kanah here, are related to the type of plant found there.) is a wadi with an intermittent stream meandering westwards from Huwara, south of Nablus, in the West Bank, Palestine, down to Jaljulia in Israel, from where it flows into the Yarkon River, of which it is a tributary.

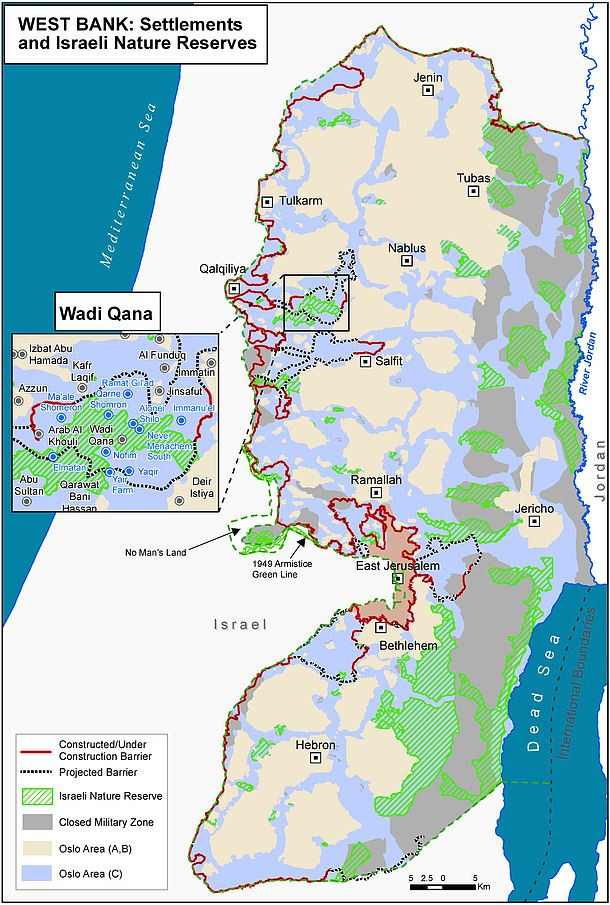

== Geography and demography ==
Wadi Qana begins south of Mount Gerizim near the village of Burin in the West Bank. Lined by steep cliffs on either side, the wadi waters flow in a general ENE-WSW direction and reach the Sharon plain near Jaljulia, Israel, where it empties into the Yarkon just west of the Yarkon interchange. West of the central anticline, its surface and sub-aquifers form one of the recharging feeders of the Yarqon Tanninim basin, 1,400 square kilometres (540 mi^{2}) of which lie east of the Green Line. The Wadi Qana area of the West Bank portion of the drainage basin encompasses approximately 229 square kilometres (88 mi^{2}). Harsh rocky limestone and karst terrain is characteristic of the terrain north of its border towards Kafr Thulth. (Note: The study area that we selected is the territory of Kufr Thulth in western Samaria where offshoot settlements existed in Roman-Byzantine times as well as in the modern era ... Kufr Thulth is located on the western margins of the Samaria Mountains near their line of contact with the Sharon Plain. Most of the area is in the mountains and is bounded by Wadi Isla on the north and by Wadi Kana on the south(Grossman & Safrai 1980, pp. 447–448).)

As of 2018, the population of the area of the wadi in the West Bank has been estimated at 176,580 Palestinians in 56 communities and 58,195 Israelis in 15 settlements.

=== Gallery ===
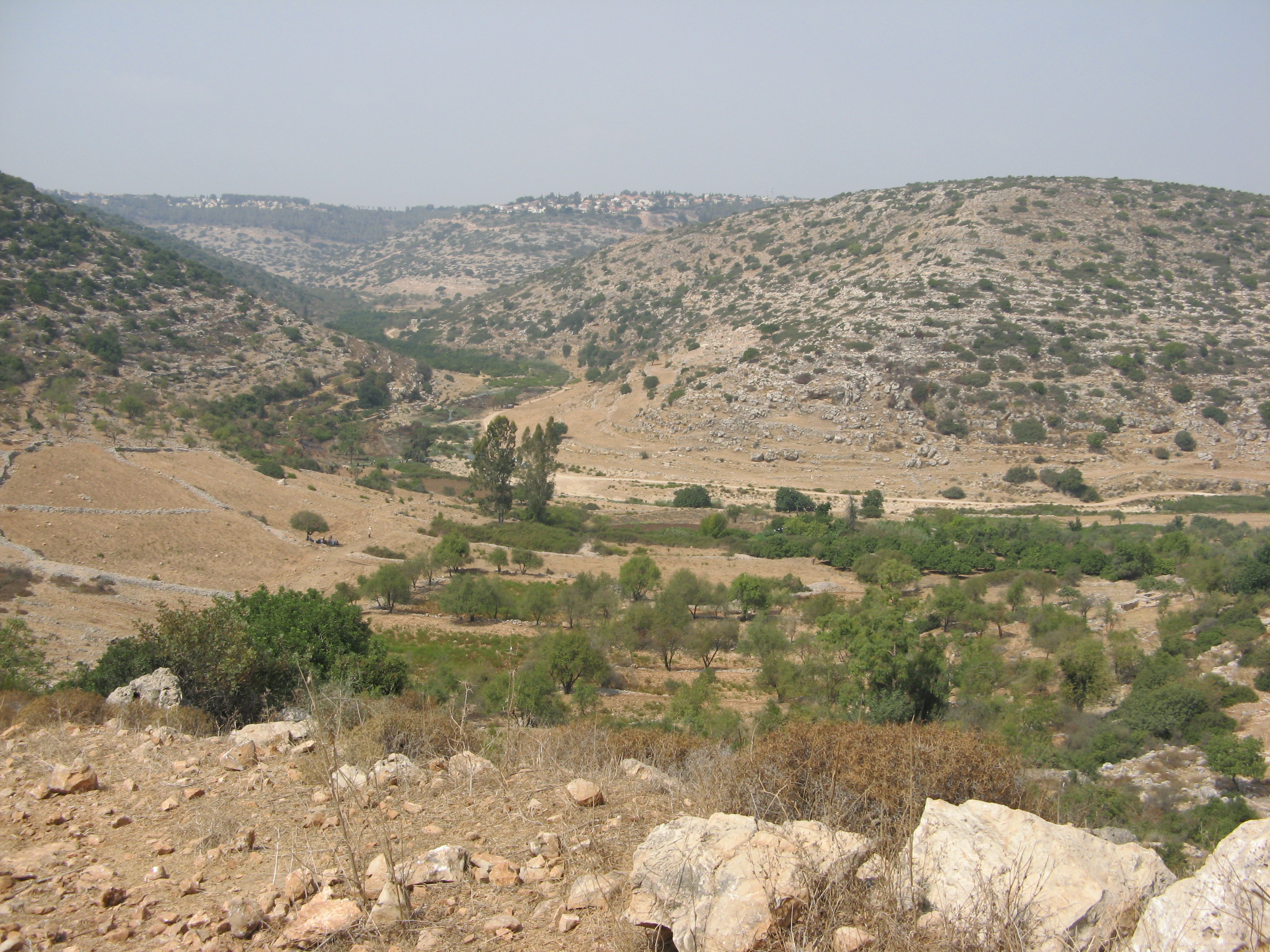
Wadi Qana

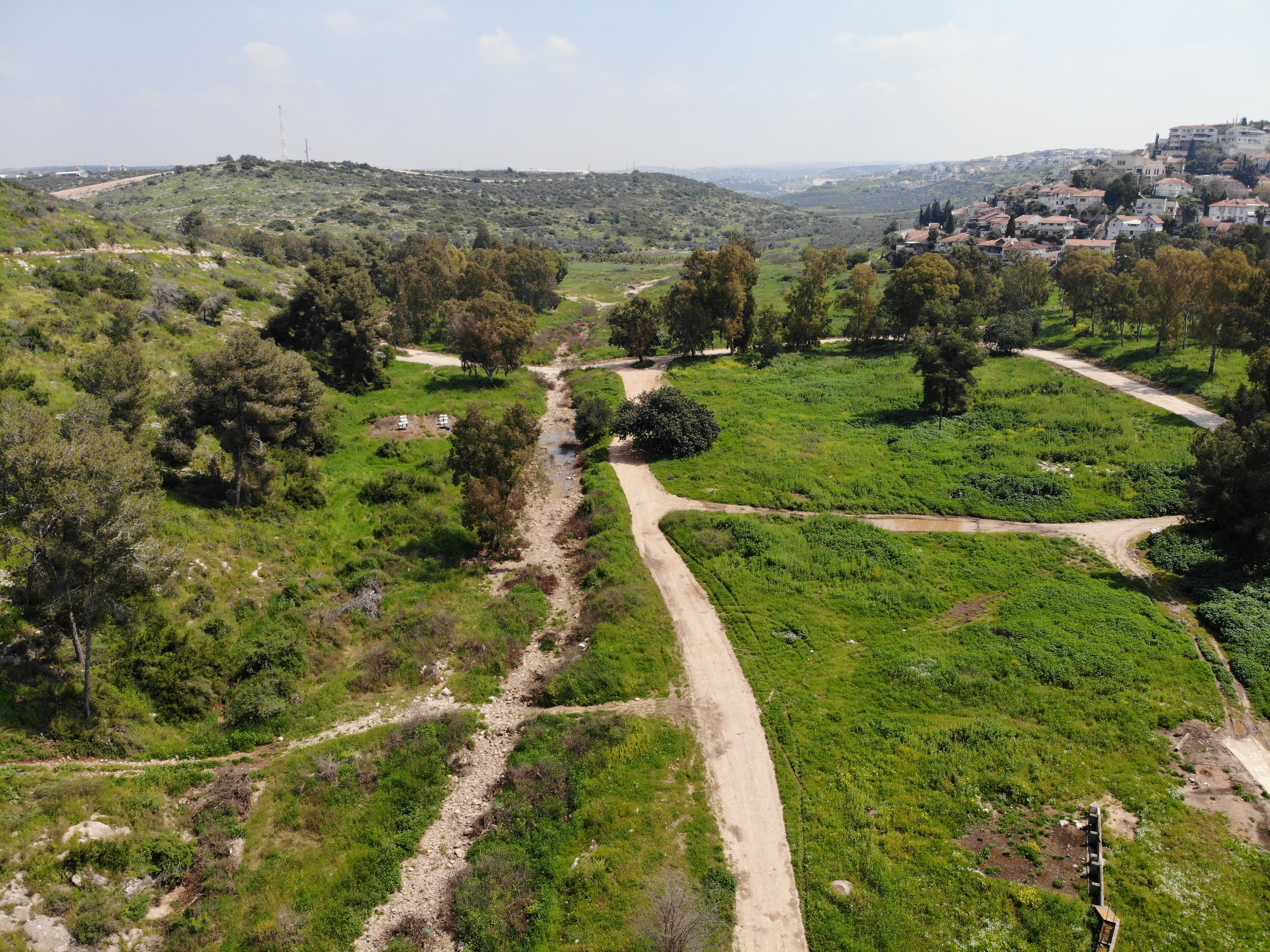
Wadi Qana riverbed

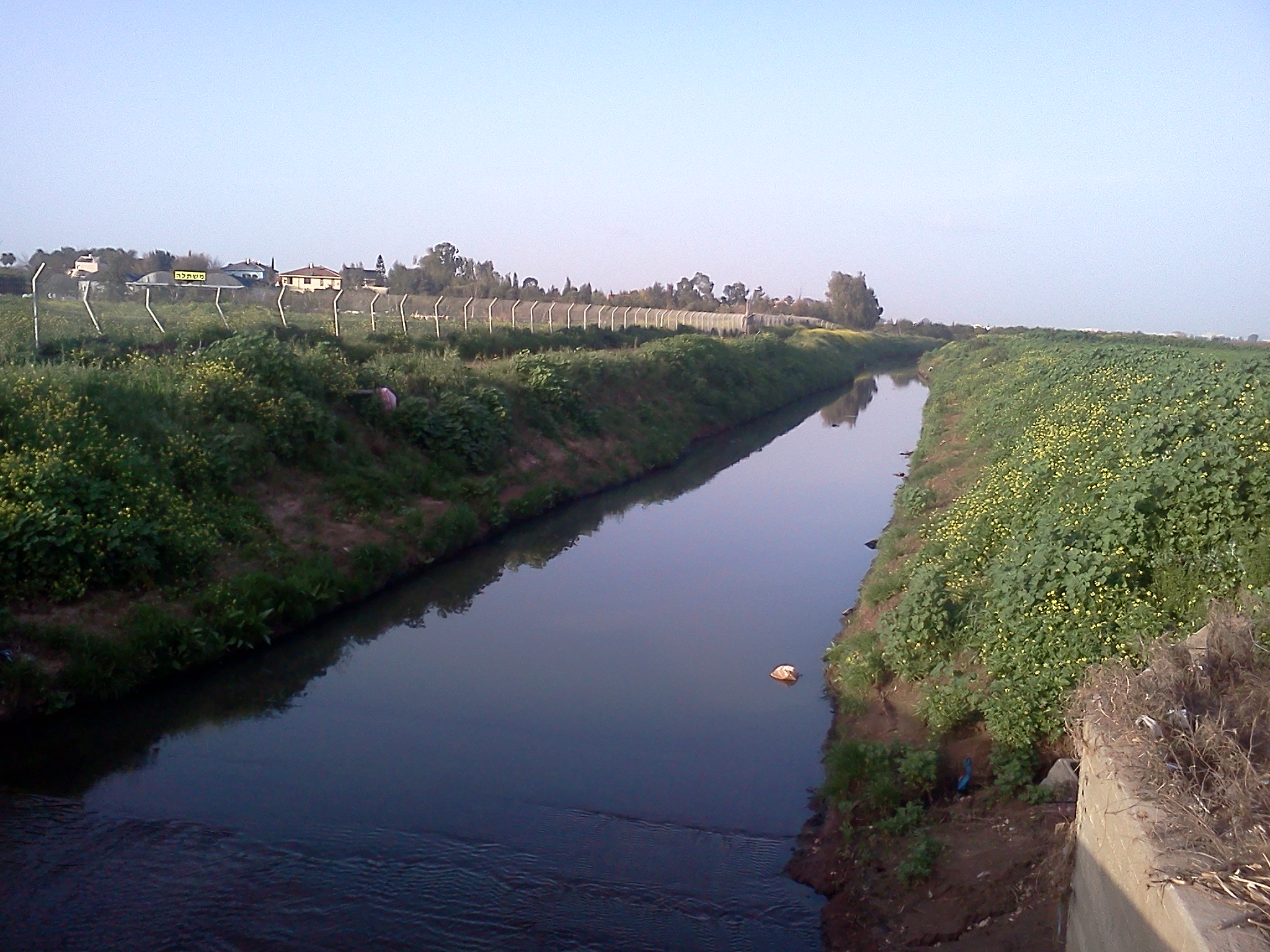
Wadi Qana stream, 2013

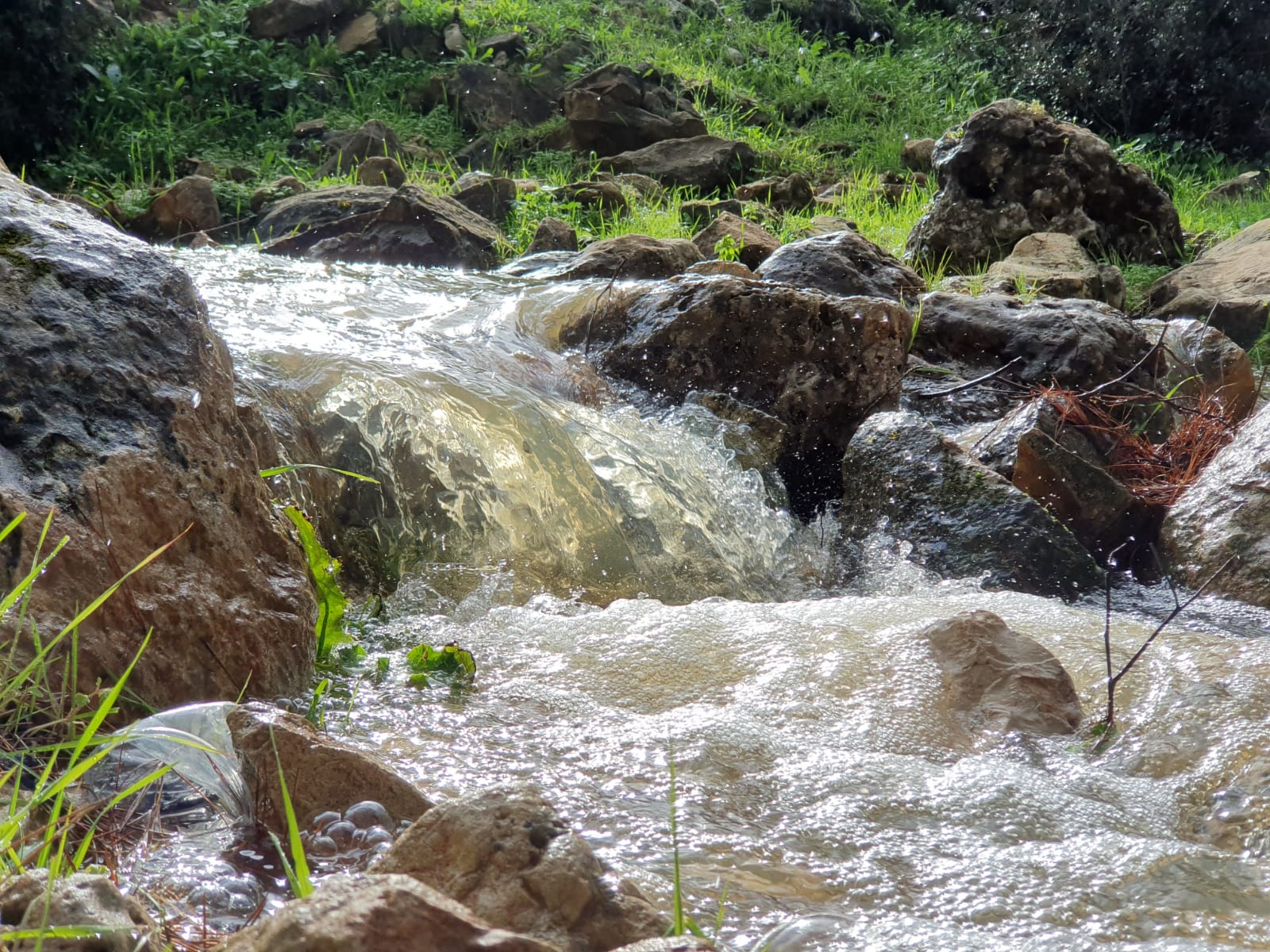
Wadi Qana winter stream

== Prehistoric remains ==
=== Dolmens ===
In 1922, the French biblical scholar and geographer Félix-Marie Abel identified stone structures in Wadi Qana, some consisting of piles seven courses high, as megaliths forming a dolmen necropolis (nécropole dolménique). Dolmens in the region, if the wider definition of the term is accepted, cover the period between the mid-4th millennium to the late-4th millennium BCE i.e. the end of the Late Chalcolithic, and the Early Bronze Age in its entirety, including what some call the Intermediate Bronze Age (see List of archaeological periods).

=== Wadi Qana cave ===
By the fourth millennium, human use of the wadi is attested by prehistorical artifacts found in a karstic cave 25 km east of the Mediterranean on the western fringe of the Samaria hills. The existence of the cave came to the attention of speleologists from the Israel Cave Research Center (ICRC) of the Society for the Protection of Nature in Israel when some villagers from Kafr Laqif told them of a deep cave in the wadi, which they then located, 250 metres up from the wadi floor, after a two-day search the following year. It contained a cemetery. Placing mortuary sites at a distance from settlements is a characteristic innovation of the Levantine Chalcolithic period, and this one could be accessed only by crawling through a 15 metre long tunnel, which then opened up into a 500 square metre subterranean hall.

Over several years, a team of Israeli archaeologists led by Avi Gopher excavated the site. Three strata were brought to light, indicating it had undergone successive occupation from the 6th millennium BCE, beginning with the Yarmukian culture, through to the Chalcolithic, down to the early Bronze Age.

==== Chalcolithic gold, earliest in the Levant ====
The Chalcolithic remains were particularly rich, with a cemetery yielding up, aside from ossuaries, pithoi, churns and varieties of creamware, 8 ring-shaped objects, mostly cast from electrum, with a 70% gold and 30% silver content. The archaeologists opined that the most probable source for the gold ingots was Egypt, where ring-shaped metallic valuables are attested from pictograms of imperial trade. Those in the Wadi Qana cave are the first known examples from the Levant. A further significant feature from the find was that the person buried with such objects, the latter suggestive of status symbols, probably had high rank, which would mean that social development in the area in that period was more advanced than hitherto thought.

== Biblical narrative ==
According to the biblical narrative of the allotment of territories, following Joshua's conquest of Canaan, Wadi Qana (naḥal qānāh, 'the brook Kanah' of Joshua 16:8, 17:9 served as the boundary running between the northern Manasseh and the southern Ephraim. (Note: "Mit dem 'Bach Kana' ist zweifellos das heutige Wādī Kānah gemeint." – "The 'brook Kanah' is without any doubt today's Wādī Kānah."(Neef 1995, p. 138)) (Note: The Septuagint gives variously Khelkaná at Joshua 16:8 (ἐπὶ Χελκανά), and Karanà (φάραγγα Καρανὰ/pháranga Karanà, 'the gully of Kanah') at Joshua 17:9 for the identical Hebrew phrase.) The description of the border is somewhat complicated, (Note: "The fractured language of v.9 makes it difficult to understand the exact role the Wadi Kanah played as a border. While it would be most natural to presume that the wadi simply divided the two tribes north and south for its whole length west of Tappuah, there are other possibilities. Perhaps we are to understand that the line 'goes down southward to the Wadi Kanah' and crosses it (so that there was Manasseh territory south of the valley in which some Ephraimite towns were located), then (the waw that starts v.9b) crosses back north so that it runs along the north rim of the wadi. One must also ask whether v.10a is a repetitive reference to this wadi line, or a more generalized statement about the entire border between the two tribes." (Nelson 1997, pp. 202–203)) (Note: Josephus at Antiquities 5:83 apparently contradicts Joshua 16:8, in stating that the northern boundary of Ephraimite settlement was the 'Great plain', which is normally taken to mean the Jezreel Valley. One interpretation has it that the passage only makes sense if in this context, the 'great plain' must be understood as the Plain of Sharon east of Wadi Qana(Sharon 2017, p. 130).) since they overlap with the former Amorite Tappuah (Note: Identified by Israel Finkelstein as the present Tel Abu Zarad (Van Der Steen 2004, pp. 96–97)) being Ephraimite but in Manasseh territory.

== Modern era ==
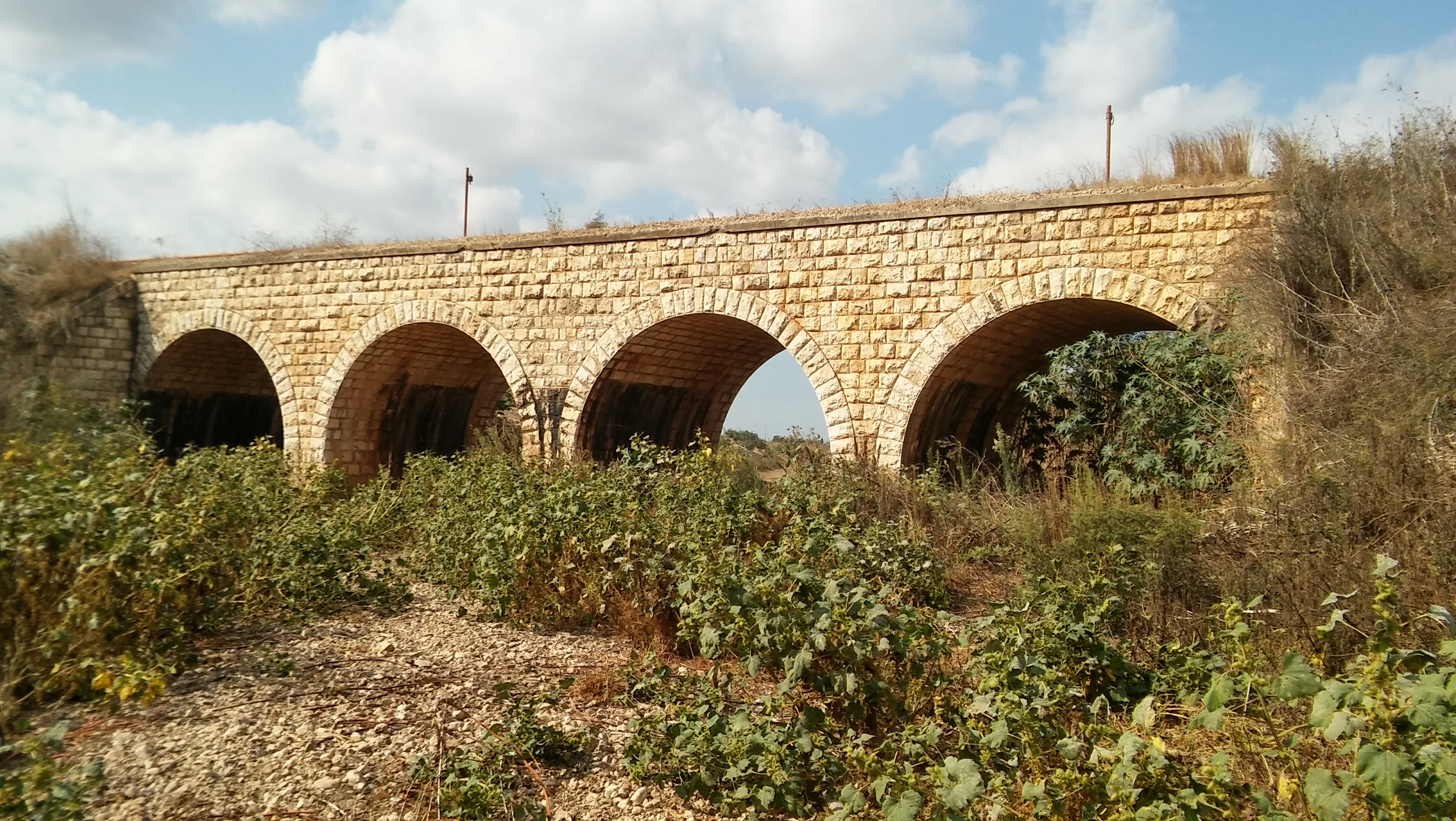
Ottoman-period railway bridge over Qana stream

=== Population: tradition and facts ===
A tradition among the population of the Wadi Qana ecosystem in the area to the north of the gully itself – an area which has a scant 139 hectares of arable land – holds that their ancestors once occupied Zakur (itself now abandoned). It has been suggested that this dispersion may have had its roots in a strong blood feud, and that the people of Zakur moved first to Kafr Thulth and, finding no good land available there, then spread out to dwell in five hamlets adjacent to Wadi Qana. The dominant group at Kafr Thulth itself, those with the best pastures, are the Gharaba family, who also own the best land in Wadi Qana's tributaries. Down to the mid-1980s, 50 families lived in the wadi itself, in a hamlet with rock structures adjacent to the stream, and known as Wadi Qana.

=== British Mandate, Jordan, and Israel/PA ===
==== British nature reserve ====
In 1926, the mandate government declared a nature reserve comprising 30,000 dunums of natural forest within the village boundaries of Deir Istiya in Wady Kanah. In 1943, this reserve was abolished and instead four forest reserves, Wad Qana and Wad Qana South, East and West, totalling about 12,000 dunums in the village lands of Deir Istiya, Jinsafur and Kafr Laqif were declared.

==== Arab settlement and agriculture ====
The West Bank part of Wadi Qana, surrounded by Palestinian villages such as Deir Istiya, Qarawat Bani Hassan, Biddya, Sanniriya, Kafr Thulth, Azzun, Kafr Laqif and Jinsafut, runs through a fertile valley and constituted one of the most notable natural attractions in terms of the beauty of its landscape, given its abundance of springs, extent of its well-watered land, and plentiful trees. The area has traditionally furnished local Palestinians with important land for grazing livestock, harvesting agricultural products, especially citrus, and for leisure (bathing). (Note: Even today children still bath in pools of spring water that are otherwise polluted(Johnson 2019, p. 144).) Many families also used it to dwell along the wadi's reaches. Its water was drawn in order to irrigate vegetable plots. It afforded rich grazing for flocks, carrying an estimated 50,000 sheep down to the early 1980s, compared to the 3,000 Palestinians still manage to tend in the wadi in recent years (2017). The wadi runs between the Palestinian administrative zones of the Salfit and Qalqilya Governorates.

It is estimated that approximately 200 local farmers worked in their fields inside the Wadi Qana valley down to 1967. In that year the area came under Israeli occupation in the wake of the Six-Day War. In the succeeding 33 years, the number of farmers shrunk to 14.

==== Israeli settlement; land and water use ====
In the 1970s Israel began deep drilling in the wadi area with its rich groundwater resources and one consequence was that many springs and wells used by local Palestinians dried up. In 1978 it began to establish Israeli settlements on the high banks on either side of the wadi. According to B'Tselem, Karnei Shomron was set up in that year on lands confiscated from four Palestinian villages: Jinsafut, Deir Istiya, Kafr Laqif and Hajjah, while Immanuel was established in 1983 taking 951 dunams from Deir Istiya, and, in establishing Sha'ar Emmanuel (1981) 159 dunams were confiscated from Immatain. To the south, both Yaqir (1981) and Nofim were established on territory was appropriated from Deir Istiya. After the Oslo Accords (1993 and 1995) and the establishment of the Palestinian National Authority (PA), the central sector of the wadi, east of Qalqiliya, became part of Area C, and was mostly owned by the villagers of Deir Istiya. Later, further illegal outposts such as Alonei Shilo (1999), Yair Farm (1999) and El Matan (2000) were set up in the wadi zone. All of these settlements discharged their sewage waste waters into the Wadi Qana stream, contaminating its use for Palestinian irrigation, until the recognized settlements were connected to the sewage system in 2006. The illegal Israeli outposts of Alonei Shilo and El Matan however continue to pollute the stream by discharging their wastewater directly into it. Palestinian villages nearby add to this pollution by using cesspits whose contents are then randomly discharged into open areas and valleys near the wadi's springs. In 1995 it was estimated that Yaqir, Karnei Shomron, and Immanuel alone annually generated approximately 908,700 cubic meters of wastewater directly into the Wadi. This combination of polluting discharges from settlements, and the reduced water flow caused by Israeli drilling undermined the traditional exploitation of its waters for irrigating vegetable crops, and forced some 50 families resident in the wadi to shift out, moving to Deir Istiya. The plan of Israel's "Separation Barrier" cuts out Deir Istiya from the wadi, leaving it on the 'Israeli' side of that sector of the West Bank. When the Kana Stream Restoration Authority (2006) was inaugurated, one of its purposes, according to leaders of the settlement councils, was to block what they regarded as attempts by 'Palestinian elements' to assume control of the wadi's stream. Since 2005 an annual spring walk takes place under the auspices of the Karnei Shomron Council. During the walk, local Palestinians, including landowners, are not permitted to access the wadi. Further projects, with large investments from the Israeli government and the Jewish National Fund, aim at developing it as a major Israeli tourist site. That part of the wadi's village lands lying in Area C may not, under the Israeli dispensation, be used for Palestinian commercial or industrial projects: The one remaining option of using it for agricultural purposes – planting olive trees, for example, is, however, hampered by severe restrictions imposed by the Israeli authorities on the grounds that such activities damage the wadi's natural flora, the topography, and the character of the habitat.' On 23 May 2021, around 15 settlers, escorted by some 5 Israeli soldiers, herded about 60 cattle into the area to graze them there. When Wadi Qana's farmers who own fields and groves there protested, they were pepper-sprayed and clubbed by settlers and one was rifle-butted by a soldier. Those not injured were prevented from leaving the valley until late at night. On returning to their homes, they found 4 of their cars damaged.

===== Israeli nature reserve; conflict =====
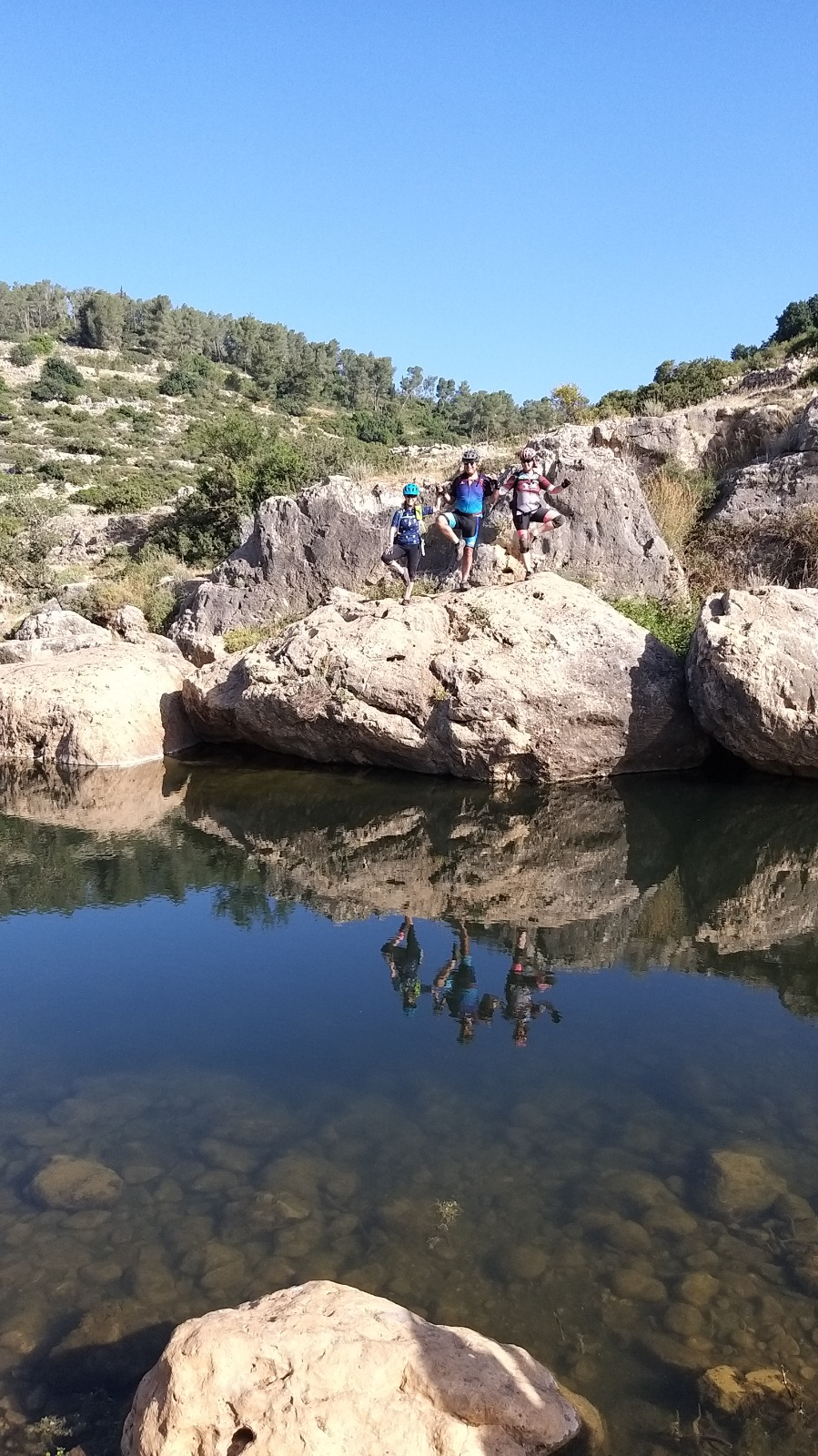
Spring in Wadi Qana, 2011

The Israeli military order (IMO) regarding Nature Protection (Judea and Samaria) (No. 363), 5730 – 1969, governs use of areas designated as nature reserves, based on similar Israeli laws. According to Friends of the Earth International, from 1979 to 1982 the area was declared a closed military zone. On 3 May 1983 it was declared a nature reserve in accordance with the IMO. The nature reserve was established on the agricultural lands of the Palestinian village of Deir Istiya. The area around the West Bank area of Wadi Qana is a nature reserve operated by the Israel Nature and Parks Authority (INPA) (Note: The Director of the "Judea and Samaria Area" [West Bank] District at the INPA is also the Nature Reserve Staff Officer in the Infrastructure Division of the Civil Administration. Staff officers work under the heads of the various divisions and, ultimately, the Head of the Civil Administration. At the same time, they are appointed by the specific Israeli governmental authority they belong to and receive their orders and salary from these agencies as well. The Civil Administration also has a dual structure as a unit within COGAT, accountable directly to the Ministry of Defense while its commanding powers come from the General Officer Commanding the Central Command who serves as the Military Commander of the occupied territory. The Staff Officer for the Nature Reserves and National Parks operates under military Order 373 that came into effect in 1970 replacing Order 81 regarding Parks of 1967 (Kanonich 2017, pp. 6–7:Shiff 2017, p. 5).) (Note: According to a statement by an Israeli peace group, Engaged Dharma, "It was declared in 1983. It was done at a time when the whole of the West Bank was under military rule, and the actual mechanism of declaration was through the army. The army is the authority governing the West Bank and there's no legislative body, so there's this procedure where the army issues a regulation, and then the area is declared a park or a nature reserve. And once it's declared a nature reserve then it comes under the authority of the Israeli Nature and Parks Authority." (Small 2018)) A hundred Jewish homes have been built inside the park. Alonei Shilo was built as an Israeli outpost within the reserve and then subsequently gained Israeli authorization by reclassifying it as part of the Karnei Shomron settlement. Land from the reserve was also allocated to the El Matan outpost. Amira Hass cites the Wadi Qana reserve as an example of Israeli efforts to "narrow the Palestinian expanse" by creating nature reserves and that the goal of the reserves is "to dispossess Palestinians".

In 2011 the Israeli National Parks Authority uprooted 1,000 olive trees planted by Wadi Palestinians and issued a directive for the grubbing up of a further 1,400. The reason given was ecological. On appeal, the Supreme Court of Israel handed down a judgement that the directive could apply only to saplings younger than 3 years. The following year Israeli park wardens nonetheless marked for destruction 2,100 olive trees, many of them older than the 3 year limit. On 23 January 2014, rangers with bulldozers under military escort ripped out between 500 and 800 olive trees which were then transported to an unknown location. Tear canisters were fired at the Palestinians protesting the measure. In August of that year, settlers constructed a new road, using bulldozers, through the wadi, without any permit. The master plan envisages a ring road connecting all the outposts and settlements, while blocking the one existing access road Palestinians may use.

According to the United Nations Office for the Coordination of Humanitarian Affairs, Israel has destroyed Palestinian irrigation channels in the Wadi Qana area "under the pretext of environmental protection". B'Tselem reported that while the wadi area was actively being developed into a tourist site, Israeli authorities were issuing orders prohibiting any Palestinian development of the land. Friends of the Earth International reported that Palestinian agricultural projects have been destroyed by the Israeli authorities "under the guise of nature protection", calling the creation of such nature reserves "a significant tool of ethnic cleansing for the Israeli occupying forces." Outposts are often built or build inside nature reserves and in the past the INPA has done little about it even working hand in hand with the settlers. In a recent departure from this practice, the INPA, in 2018, initiated proceedings against 3 settlers from Alonei Shiloh for constructing a road partly passing through the reserve.

== Biodiversity ==
The site is the only known location of Pelobates syriacus in the West Bank. Research into the area's unique environment was undertaken by the Palestine Museum of Natural History.

== Bibliography ==
- Abel, Félix-Marie (1938). Géographie de la Palestine. Vol. 2 (3rd ed.). Librairie Le Coffre.
- Aharoni, Yohanan (1979). The Land of the Bible: A Historical Geography (2nd ed.). Westminster John Knox Press. ISBN 978-0-664-24266-4.
- Baltzer, Anna (2019) [First published 2006]. Witness in Palestine: A Jewish Woman in the Occupied Territories. Routledge. ISBN 978-1-317-24884-2.
- Benvenisti, Eyal (4 March 2019). Legal Dualism: The Absorption Of The Occupied Territories Into Israel. Taylor & Francis. pp. 61–. ISBN 978-0-429-71447-4.
- Benvenisti, Eyal; Gvirtzman, Haim (Summer 1993). "Harnessing International Law to Determine Israeli-Palestinian Water Rights: The Mountain Aquifer". Natural Resources Journal. 33 (3): 543–567.
- Benvenisti, Meron (2000). Sacred Landscape: The Buried History of the Holy Land since 1948. University of California Press. ISBN 978-0-520-92882-4.
- Conder, C.R.; Kitchener, H.H. (1882). The Survey of Western Palestine: Memoirs of the Topography, Orography, Hydrography, and Archaeology. Vol. 2. Committee of the Palestine Exploration Fund – via Internet Archive.
- Crowley, Edward J. (1992). "The Book of Joshua". In Suggs, M. Jack; Sakenfeld, Katharine Doob; Mueller, James R (eds.). The Oxford Study Bible: Revised English Bible with Apocrypha. OUP(USA). pp. 220–245. ISBN 978-0-195-29000-4.
- "Deir Istiya Town Profile" (PDF). Applied Research Institute–Jerusalem. 2013.
- "Environmental Nakba: Environmental injustice and violations of the Israeli occupation of Palestine" (PDF). Friends of the Earth International. September 2013.
- "Forests Ordinance Proclamation No. 2 of 1943". The Palestine Gazette (1261, Supp. 2). Jerusalem: British Mandatory Authority: 355–358. 15 April 1943.
- Fraser, James A. (2018). Dolmens in the Levant. Routledge. ISBN 978-1-351-37542-9.
- Gopher, Ari; Shalev, Sariel; Gophna, Ram; Tsuk, Tsevikah (August–October 1990). "Earliest Gold Artifacts in the Levant". Current Anthropology. 31 (4): 436–443 =. doi:10.1086/203868. JSTOR 2743275.
- Gopher, Avi; Tsuk, Tsevikah (1996). The Naḥal Qanah Cave: Earliest Gold in the Southern Levant. Institute of Archaeology of Tel Aviv University. ISBN 978-9-654-40005-3.
- Gorney, Edna (2016). "Roots of Identity, Canopy of Collision: Re-Visioning Trees as an Evolving National Symbol Within the Israeli-Palestinian Conflict". In de Melo, Cristina Joanaz; Vaz, Estelita; Costa Pinto, Lígia M. (eds.). Environmental History in the Making: Volume II: Acting. Springer. pp. 327–343. ISBN 978-3-319-41139-2.
- Grossman, David; Safrai, Zeev (4 October 1980). "Satellite Settlements in Western Samaria". Geographical Review. 70 (4): 446–461. Bibcode:1980GeoRv..70..446G. doi:10.2307/214078. JSTOR 214078.(subscription required)
- Hareuveni, Eyal (May 2011). Dispossession & Exploitation, Israel's policy in the Jordan Valley & northern Dead Sea (PDF) (Report). B'Tselem. p. 23 – via ReliefWeb.
- Hass, Amira (19 January 2020). "In West Bank, Jewish Settlers Recruit Nature to Their Mission – With the High Court's Consent". Haaretz.
- "Immatin Village Profile (including Far'ata Locality)" (PDF). Applied Research Institute–Jerusalem. 2013.
- Isaac, Jad; Qumsieh, Violet; Owewi, Maher (1995). "Assessing the Pollution of the West Bank Water Resources" (PDF). Applied Research Institute–Jerusalem. pp. 1–14.
- "The Israelization of Qana Valley in Salfit Governorate". POICA. 26 May 2016.
- Johnson, Penny (2019). Companions in conflict: animals in occupied Palestine. Melville House. ISBN 978-1-612-19744-9.
- Kanonich, Yonatan (December 2017). Through the Lens of Israel's Interests, the Civil Administration in the West Bank (PDF) (Report). Yesh Din.
- Lamberty-Zielinsky, Hedwig (1974). "Qānā". In Botterweck, G. Johannes; Ringgren, Helmer; Heinz-Josef Fabry, Heinz-Josef (eds.). Theological Dictionary of the Old Testament. Vol. 13. Wm. B. Eerdmans Publishing. pp. 65–72. ISBN 978-0-802-82337-3.
- Levinson, Chaim; Rinat, Zafrir (2 October 2014). "Israel Lets Unauthorized West Bank Outpost Encroach Into Nature Reserve". Haaretz.
- Levy, Thomas E. (2003). "Chalcolithic". In Peregrine, Peter N.; Ember, Melvin (eds.). Encyclopedia of Prehistory. Vol. 8. Kluwer Publishers/ Plenum Publishers. pp. 56–73. ISBN 978-0-306-46262-7.
- Makdisi, Saree (2010). Palestine Inside Out: An Everyday Occupation. W. W. Norton & Company. ISBN 978-0-393-33844-7.
- Naser, Shawkat; Ghanem, Marwan (2018). "Environmental and Socio- Economic Impact of Wastewater in Wadi- Qana Drainage Basin". Palestine Journal of Geographical Research. 1 (1): 1–7. doi:10.30564/jgr.v1i1.162.
- Neef, Heinz-Dieter (1995). Ephraim: Studien zur Geschichte des Stammes Ephraim von der Landname bis zur frühen Königszeit (in German). Walter de Gruyter. ISBN 978-3-110-14756-8.
- Nelson, Richard (1997). Joshua: A Commentary. Westminster John Knox Press. ISBN 978-0-664-22666-4.
- "OCHA Weekly report (24-30 November 2010)" (PDF). United Nations Office for the Coordination of Humanitarian Affairs. 3 December 2010.
- "Proclamation under Forests Ordinance 1926". Official Gazette of the Government of Palestine (161). Jerusalem: British Mandatory Authority: 191. 16 April 1926.
- Qumsiyeh, Mazin, ed. (July 2018). "Socio-economic Sustainable Development and Environmental Conservation at the Northern Transition Zone to Wadi Qana Protected Area, Palestine" (PDF). Bethlehem University.
- Rinat, Zafrir (28 December 2018). "Israeli Settlers Who Build in West Bank Nature Reserves Now Facing Trial". Haaretz. Archived from the original on 28 December 2018.
- "Settlement expansion around an Israeli-declared "nature reserve"". United Nations Office for the Coordination of Humanitarian Affairs. 31 October 2014.
- "Settlers' walk today in Wadi Qana". B'Tselem. 23 April 2015b.
- Sharif, Yara (2017). Architecture of Resistance: Cultivating Moments of Possibility within the Palestinian/Israeli Conflict. Routledge. ISBN 978-1-315-52427-6.
- Sharon, Nadav (2017). Judea under Roman Domination: The First Generation of Statelessness and Its Legacy. SBL Press. ISBN 978-0-884-14221-8.
- Shiff, Chemi (December 2017). On which Side is the Grass Greener? National parks in Israel and the West Bank (PDF) (Report). Emek Shaveh. Archived from the original on 19 June 2022.
- Small, Matthew (2018). The Wall Between Us: Notes from the Holy Land. Legend Press. ISBN 978-1-910-26631-1.
- Van Der Steen, E. J. (2004). Tribes and Territories in Transition: The Central East Jordan Valley in the Late Bronze Age and Early Iron Age: a Study of the Sources. Peeters Publishers. ISBN 978-9-042-91385-1.
- "Wadi Qana – From Palestinian agricultural valley to settlements' tourism park". B'Tselem. 23 April 2015a.
- "Wadi Qana, Salfit District: Settlers escorted by military lead herd of cattle through cultivated fields and attack farmers". B'Tselem. 2021.
- Woudstra, Marten (1981). The Book of Joshua. Wm. B. Eerdmans Publishing. ISBN 978-0-802-82525-4.
