= El Matan =

- Location within the Northern West Bank
- Coordinates: 32°09′04″N 35°04′31″E
- Country: Israel
- District: Judea and Samaria Area
- Council: Shomron
- Region: West Bank
- Founded: 2000
- Founder: Religious youths

El Matan (Hebrew: אל מתן, lit. 'Towards Matan' or 'God's Gift') is an illegal Israeli outpost in the West Bank on the lands of the Palestinian village of Wad Qana, located around a kilometer south of Ma'ale Shomron, under the jurisdiction of the Shomron Regional Council. The outpost was established in 2000 on the Wadi Qana Nature reserve – one of the largest and most important such reserves in the West Bank – by a group of religious youths from the nearby settlements of (Karnei Shomron and Ma'ale Shomron). It is home to an estimated population of 48 (2008), around 16 families and a small number of singles, both religious and non-religious Jews.

El Matan is considered an unauthorized outpost by the Israeli government and is illegal under Israeli and international law. The international community does not differentiate between Israeli outposts and Israeli settlements authorized by the Israeli government. The international community considers Israeli settlements in the West Bank illegal under international law, though the Israeli government disputes this.

A synagogue erected on the site was closed down for lacking a building permit from the authorities in the Israeli Civil Administration. On 2 October 2014 Haaretz carried notification of a master plan envisaging the confiscation from Wad Qana, an area farmed by Palestinians, of 100 dunams of land for the El Matan outpost.
