= Kafr Thulth =

- Municipality type C

Arabic transcription(s)
  - Arabic: كفر ثلث
  - Latin: Kufr Thulth (official)
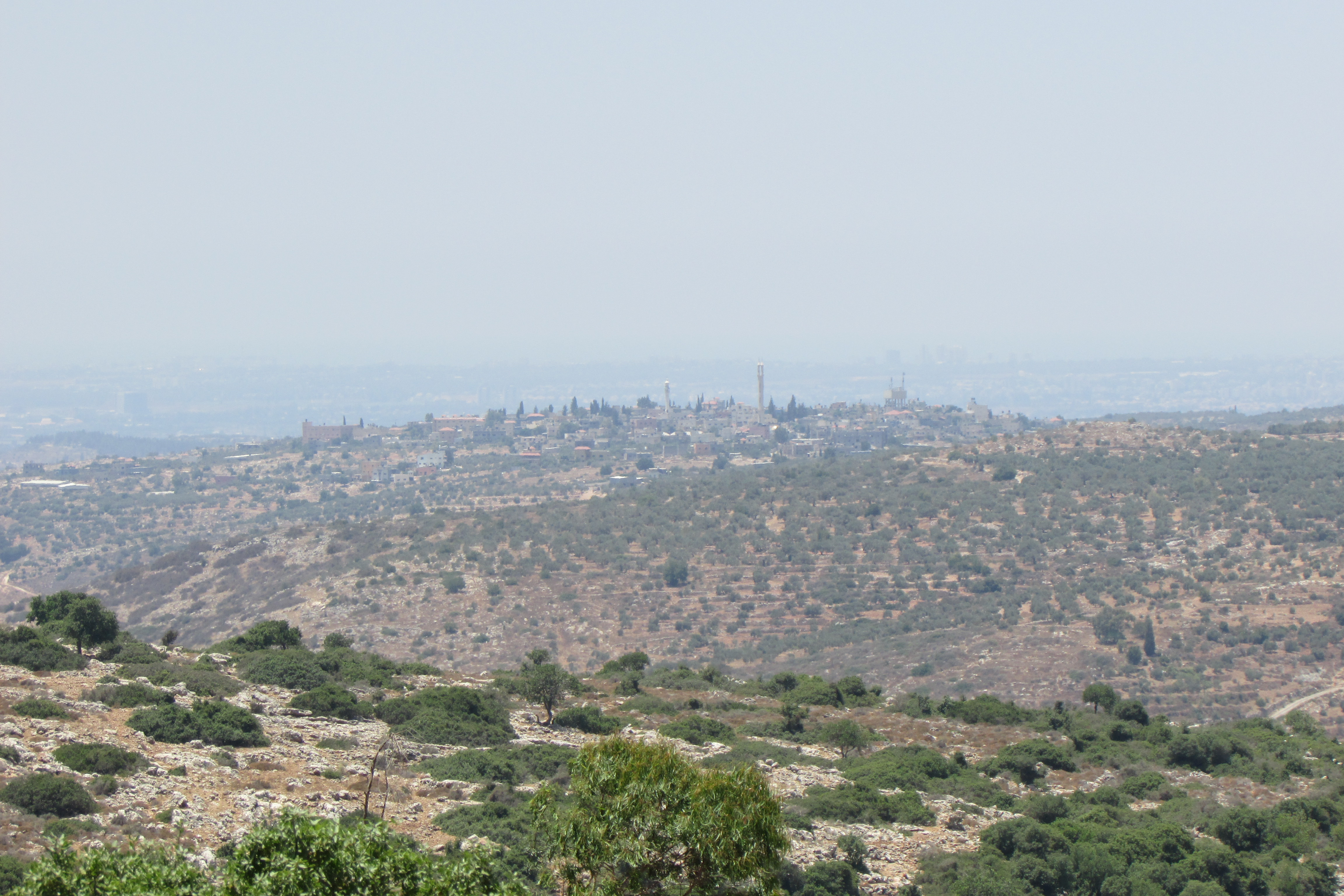
- Kafr Thulth from the east

- Location of Kafr Thulth within Palestine
- Coordinates: 32°9′9″N 35°2′39″E
- Palestine grid: 154/173
- State: State of Palestine
- Governorate: Qalqilya

Government
  - Type: Municipality
  - Head of Municipality: Hussein al-Saifi

Area
  - Total: 24.9 km^{2} (9.6 sq mi)
- Elevation: 173 m (568 ft)

Population (2017)
  - Total: 5,606
  - Density: 225/km^{2} (583/sq mi)
- Name meaning: "The ruin of the village of the third part"

Kafr Thulth (Arabic: كفر ثلث) is a Palestinian town located on high flat land south of Azzoun, 28 kilometers (17 mi) south of Tulkarm in the Qalqilya Governorate. The average elevation is 270 meters (890 ft) above sea level. According to the Palestinian Central Bureau of Statistics, the town's population was 5,606 in the 2017 census.

== Name ==
Kafr in Syriac means "village" and Thulth means "three" or "a third". This name preserves the place name, originally in Hebrew, of Baal-shalisha, an ancient Biblical village believed to have been located 3.5 miles (5.6 km) to the south at a site known in modern times as Khirbat Sirisya.

== Geography ==
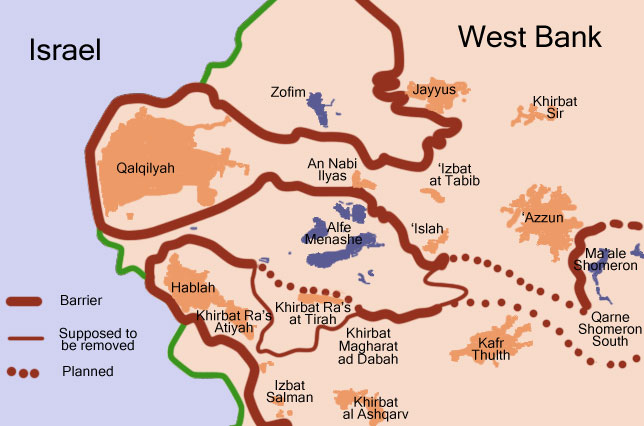
Map of path of the separation barrier around the Qalqilya and Hableh-Ras Atiya enclaves and the proposed path around Kafr Thulth

Kafr Thulth is bordered by Azzun to the south, Sanniriya and Biddya villages to the east and Deir Istiya to the west. In 1948, parts of Kharab and Aizab, such as, Salman, al-Moudwer, al-Sheikh Ahmad, al-Ashqar, Ras Tirah, al-Dabha, Kirash Kherba and Ras Atiya — villages or land areas that originally belonged to Kafr Thulth were separated from the town by the Green Line, which forms the border between Israel and the West Bank.

Kafr Thulth's land was extended to the border of the Auja stream and by the 19th century the town's total land area was about 50-60,000 dunams. It had bordered Habla, Jaljuliya, Azzun and Islah, but Kafr Thulth's jurisdiction decreased in 1954; Then, the built area was 924 dunams, while the distance reached up to Kherash Kherba that belong to Kafr Thulth 3,665 dunams.

== History ==
=== Ottoman era ===
In 1517, the village was incorporated into the Ottoman Empire with the rest of Palestine, and in 1596, Kafr Tult appeared in Ottoman tax registers as being in nahiya (subdistrict) of Jabal Qubal under the liwa' (district) of Nablus. It had a population of 13 Muslim households and 1 batchelor. They paid a fixed tax rate of 33.3%, on wheat, barley, summer crops, occasional revenues, goats and/or beehives; a total of 1,100 akçe.

In 1838, Kafr Thulth was included in a village list drawn up by Edward Robinson, part of Jurat Merda, south of Nablus, named as Kefr Telet.

In 1852, Robinson described Kafr Thulth as "a ruin", and the same did Victor Guérin in 1870. However, later researchers have noted that both only saw Kafr Thulth from a distance, and might have had it mixed up with the original location of Kufr Qara, which became abandoned and transferred together with its name to the Wadi 'Ara area in northern Israel.

In 1870/1871 (1288 AH), an Ottoman census listed the village in the nahiya (sub-district) of Jamma'in al-Awwal, subordinate to Nablus.

In 1882 the PEF's Survey of Western Palestine described the village (called Khurbet Kefr Thilth) as "a small village on high ground, with two wells. It was in ruins in 1852, but has now a few inhabitants, the ground round is rough and uncultivated."

=== British Mandate era ===
In the 1922 census of Palestine conducted by the British Mandate authorities, Kufr Thelth had a population of 643, all Muslims, while in the 1931 census Kafr Thulth, (including Khirbat Khris), had 169 occupied houses and a population of 955, still all Muslim.

In the 1945 statistics the population of Kafr Thulth was 1290 Muslims.

==== Land ownership in 1945 ====
Ethnic group	Land ownership (dunums)
Arab	24,851
Jewish	82
Public	5
Total	24,938

==== Land usage in 1945 ====
Land usage type	Arab (dunum)	Jewish (dunum)
Irrigated and plantation	1,629	0
Area planted with olives	1,921	0
Planted with cereals	6,329	62
Built up	55	0
Cultivable	7,958	62
Non-cultivable	16,843	20
Lands usurped within armistice area	0	1,241 dunums

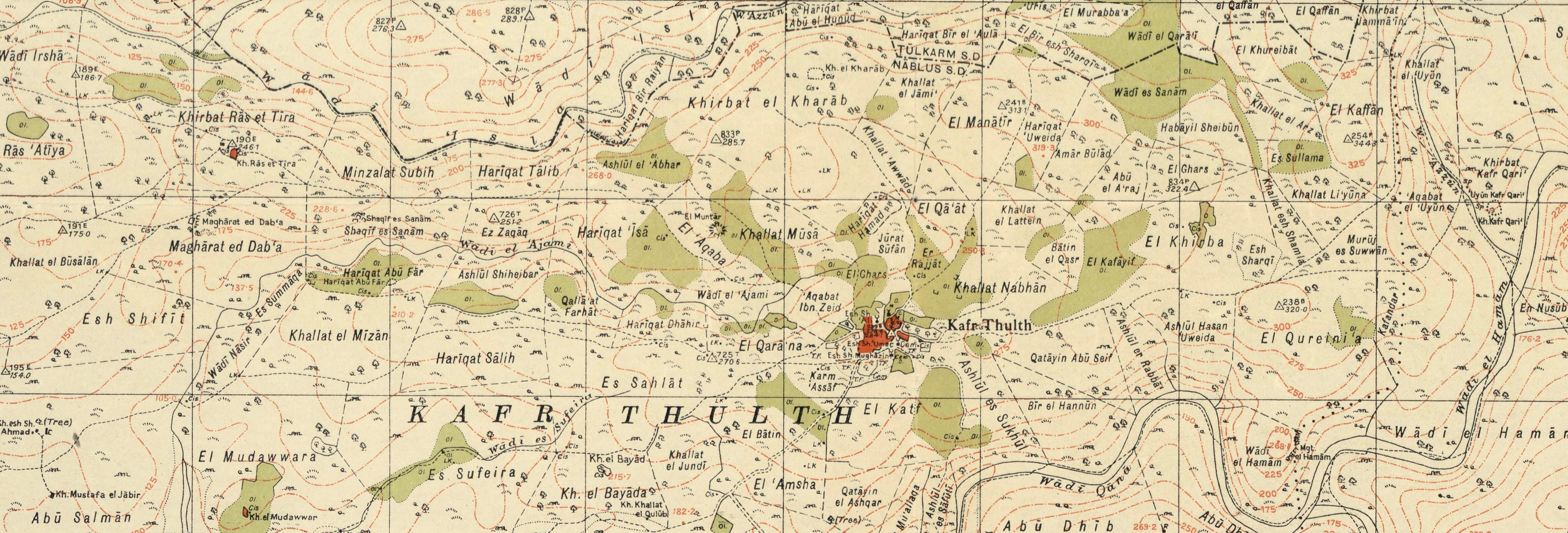
Kafr Thulth 1943 1:20,000

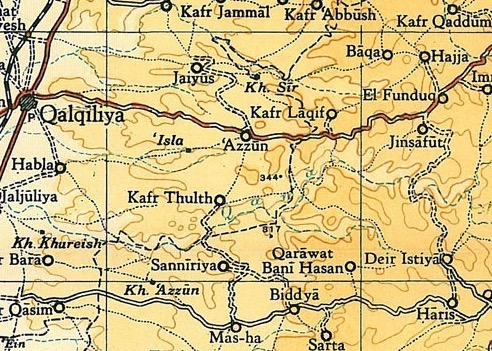
Kafr Thulth 1945 1:250,000

=== Jordanian era ===
In the wake of the 1948 Arab–Israeli War, and after the 1949 Armistice Agreements, Kfar Thulth came under Jordanian rule. It was annexed by Jordan in 1950.

In 1961, the population of Kafr Thulth was 1,213.

=== 1967-present ===
Since the Six-Day War in 1967, Kafr Thulth has been under Israeli occupation.

After the 1995 accords, about 10.7% of the land was classified as Area B, the remaining 89.3% as Area C. Israel has confiscated 367 dunums of village land for the construction of the Israeli settlements of Karne Shomron, Ginot Shomron, Ma'ale Shomron and Emmanuel, as well as for the construction of the Israeli West Bank barrier.

In a separate incident on 28 December 2025, a Palestinian man from Izbat Salman (Qalqiliya Governorate), a subsidiary of Kafer Thulth, fell while attempting to cross the Barrier near the town of Ar Ram. He was taken to a hospital in Israel, where he was later pronounced dead. Israeli forces subsequently withheld his body; the case was not included in the total number of Palestinians reported as killed by Israeli forces.

== Sanctuaries ==
=== Sheikh Al-Maghazin ===
In the village center, a sanctuary used to be dedicated to a saint named ash-Sheikh al-Maghazin. Legend holds that one person from Jenin, having married into the local 'Arar family, dreamt of al-Maghazin who directed him to establish a shrine at this location. Alternatively, another tradition suggest the original site was located on a hill outside the village, intended as a lookout to signal the approach of Crusader forces. The site, named for the Arabic term for raiding force, served as a resting place for Muslim warriors. Local traditions date the sanctuary's construction to more than 300 years ago. It is surrounded by a cemetery belonging to the 'Isa family.

=== Sheikh Ali ===
Located in the center of the Al Gharbeh family cemetery, a maqam named ash-Sheikh Ali used to honor saint of the same name, who in the village during the 19th century. Believing in his blessing power, the villagers made sure to fulfill his needs. After he left the village, they constructed the maqam at the spot where he had lived.

== Demography ==
The people of Kafr Thulth originally came from Tafilah (in modern Jordan), Shuafat and Beit Lid.

Residents consider the Al Gharbeh clan to be the first to live in Kafr Thulth. According to their tradition, they lived there before the Islamic conquest, and converted to Islam shortly afterwards.

== Bibliography ==
- Barron, J.B., ed. (1923). Palestine: Report and General Abstracts of the Census of 1922. Government of Palestine.
- Conder, C.R.; Kitchener, H. H. (1882). The Survey of Western Palestine: Memoirs of the Topography, Orography, Hydrography, and Archaeology. Vol. 2. London: Committee of the Palestine Exploration Fund.
- Freedman, D.N.; Myers, Allen C.; Beck, Astrid B. (2000). Eerdmans dictionary of the Bible (Illustrated ed.). Wm. B. Eerdmans Publishing. ISBN 978-0-8028-2400-4.
- Government of Jordan, Department of Statistics (1964). First Census of Population and Housing. Volume I: Final Tables; General Characteristics of the Population (PDF).
- Government of Palestine, Department of Statistics (1945). Village Statistics, April, 1945.
- Grossman, David; Safrai, Z. (1980). "Satellite Settlements in Western Samaria". Geographical Review. 70 (4). American Geographical Society: 446–461. Bibcode:1980GeoRv..70..446G. doi:10.2307/214078. JSTOR 214078.
- Guérin, V. (1875). Description Géographique Historique et Archéologique de la Palestine (in French). Vol. 2: Samarie, pt. 2. Paris: L'Imprimerie Nationale.
- Hadawi, S. (1970). Village Statistics of 1945: A Classification of Land and Area ownership in Palestine. Palestine Liberation Organization Research Center.
- Hütteroth, W.-D.; Abdulfattah, K. (1977). Historical Geography of Palestine, Transjordan and Southern Syria in the Late 16th Century. Erlanger Geographische Arbeiten, Sonderband 5. Erlangen, Germany: Vorstand der Fränkischen Geographischen Gesellschaft. ISBN 3-920405-41-2.
- Mills, E., ed. (1932). Census of Palestine 1931. Population of Villages, Towns and Administrative Areas. Jerusalem: Government of Palestine.
- Palmer, E.H. (1881). The Survey of Western Palestine: Arabic and English Name Lists Collected During the Survey by Lieutenants Conder and Kitchener, R. E. Transliterated and Explained by E.H. Palmer. Committee of the Palestine Exploration Fund.
- Robinson, E.; Smith, E. (1841). Biblical Researches in Palestine, Mount Sinai and Arabia Petraea: A Journal of Travels in the year 1838. Vol. 3. Boston: Crocker & Brewster.
- Robinson, E.; Smith, E. (1856). Later Biblical Researches in Palestine and adjacent regions: A Journal of Travels in the year 1852. London: John Murray.
