= Ma'ale Shomron =

Israeli settlement in the West Bank

Ma'ale Shomron: מַעֲלֵה שׁוֹמְרוֹן (Hebrew)
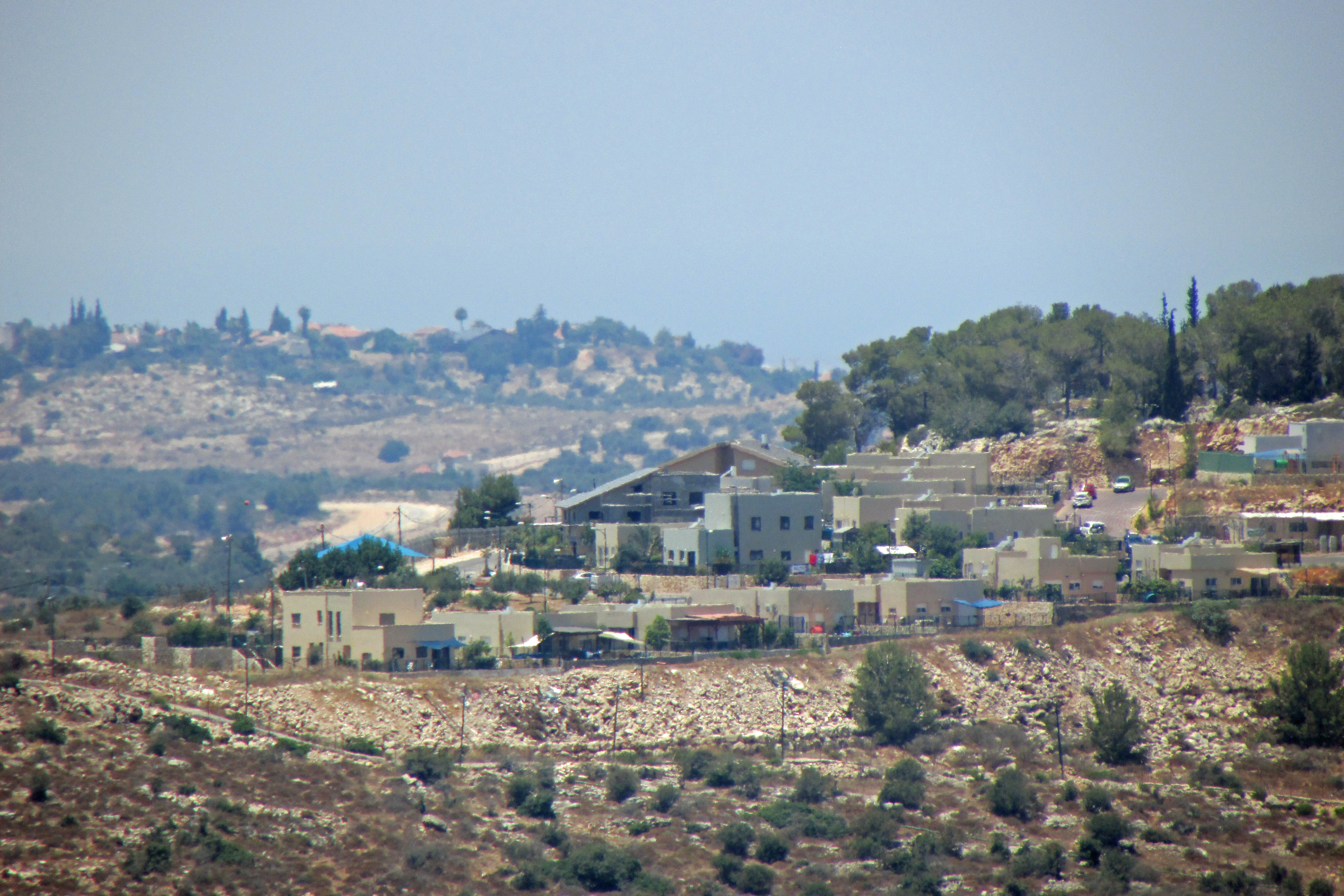

- Location within the Northern West Bank
- Coordinates: 32°9′53″N 35°4′16″E
- Country: Palestine
- District: Judea and Samaria Area
- Council: Shomron
- Region: West Bank
- Affiliation: Mishkei Herut Beitar
- Founded: 1980
- Population (2019): 996

Ma'ale Shomron (Hebrew: מַעֲלֵה שׁוֹמְרוֹן) is an Israeli settlement in the northern West Bank. Located about 300 metres above sea level, it is organised as a community settlement and falls under the jurisdiction of Shomron Regional Council. In 2019 it had a population of 996.

The international community considers Israeli settlements in the West Bank illegal under international law, but the Israeli government disputes this.

== History ==
The settlement was established in February 1980 by a mixed group of Orthodox and non-religious Israelis from the Beitar and Herut movements. It is closely bordered by Karnei Shomron.

According to ARIJ, Israel confiscated land from several Palestinian villages in order to construct Ma'ale Shomron, including 268 dunums of land from Azzun, 69 dunams from Deir Istiya, and 367 dunums of land from Kafr Thulth / Arab Al Khouleh (including land for Karnei Shomron and Emmanuel).

== Archaeology ==
Located within the settlement is the archaeological site of Khirbet Jamma'in, where an ancient Israelite village from the First Temple period (Iron Age II) was discovered in 1976. A salvage excavation carried out in 1979, just before the establishment of the settlement, revealed a range of structures including four-room houses, an olive oil press, a winepress, a watering hole, a quarry, and terraces. The archaeological evidence suggests that the village likely housed a population of around 600 to 800 individuals. However, by the 7th century BCE, the site had been abandoned.

== Notable residents ==
- Dani Dayan, chairman of Yad Vashem, former Consul General of Israel in New York City and former head of Yesha Council
