= Deir Istiya =

- Municipality type D (Village council)

Arabic transcription(s)
  - Arabic: دير إستيا
  - Latin: Deir Istya (official); Dayr Istiya (unofficial)
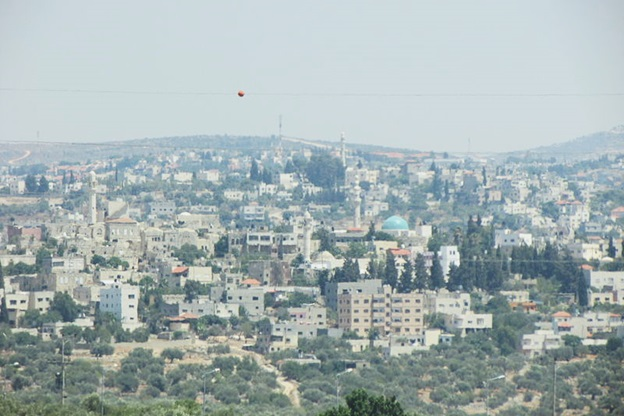
- Skyline of Deir Istiya, 2015

- Location of Deir Istiya within Palestine
- Coordinates: 32°07′50″N 35°08′24″E
- Palestine grid: 163/170
- State: State of Palestine
- Governorate: Salfit

Government
  - Type: Village council
  - Head of Municipality: Jamal Alfaris

Area
  - Total: 36.0 km^{2} (13.9 sq mi)
- Elevation: 379 m (1,243 ft)

Population (2017)
  - Total: 3,696
  - Density: 103/km^{2} (266/sq mi)
- Name meaning: "Monastery of Istiya"

Deir Istiya (Arabic: دير إستيا) is a Palestinian town of 3,696 in the Salfit Governorate of the State of Palestine, in the northern West Bank, 15 kilometers (9.3 mi) southwest of Nablus. The built-up area of Deir Istiya is 74 dunams, and its old city has about thirty families.

== Location ==
Deir Istiya is 6.62 kilometers (4.11 mi) north of Salfit. It is bordered by Zeita Jamma’in and Kifl Haris to the east, Haris and Qarawat Bani Hassan to the south, Kafr Thulth and ‘Azzun to the west, and Kafr Laqif, Jinsafut and Immatain to the north.

== History ==
The town is named for the nearby tomb of Istiya which, according to ethnographer Tawfiq Canaan and historian Moshe Sharon, is the Arabic name for Isaiah.

Potsherds from Iron Age II, Crusader/Ayyubid and the Mamluk era have been found by at Deir Istiya. A ritual bath typical of the Second Temple period was discovered in the northwestern part of the village core. It is unclear whether Samaritans or Jews used it.

In the 12th and 13th centuries, during the Crusader era, Deir Istiya was inhabited by Muslims, according to Ḍiyāʼ al-Dīn. He also noted that followers of Ibn Qudamah lived here.

In 1394 Deir Istiya was required to supply lentils, olive oil and flour as a religious endowment (waqf) to the Ibrahimi Mosque in Hebron on the orders of the Mamluk sultan Barquq. Since the Mamluk era in Palestine, Deir Istiya has been a center of olive-based agriculture. Today, it possesses one of the largest areas of land planted with olive groves, at nearly 10,000 dunams.

=== Ottoman era ===
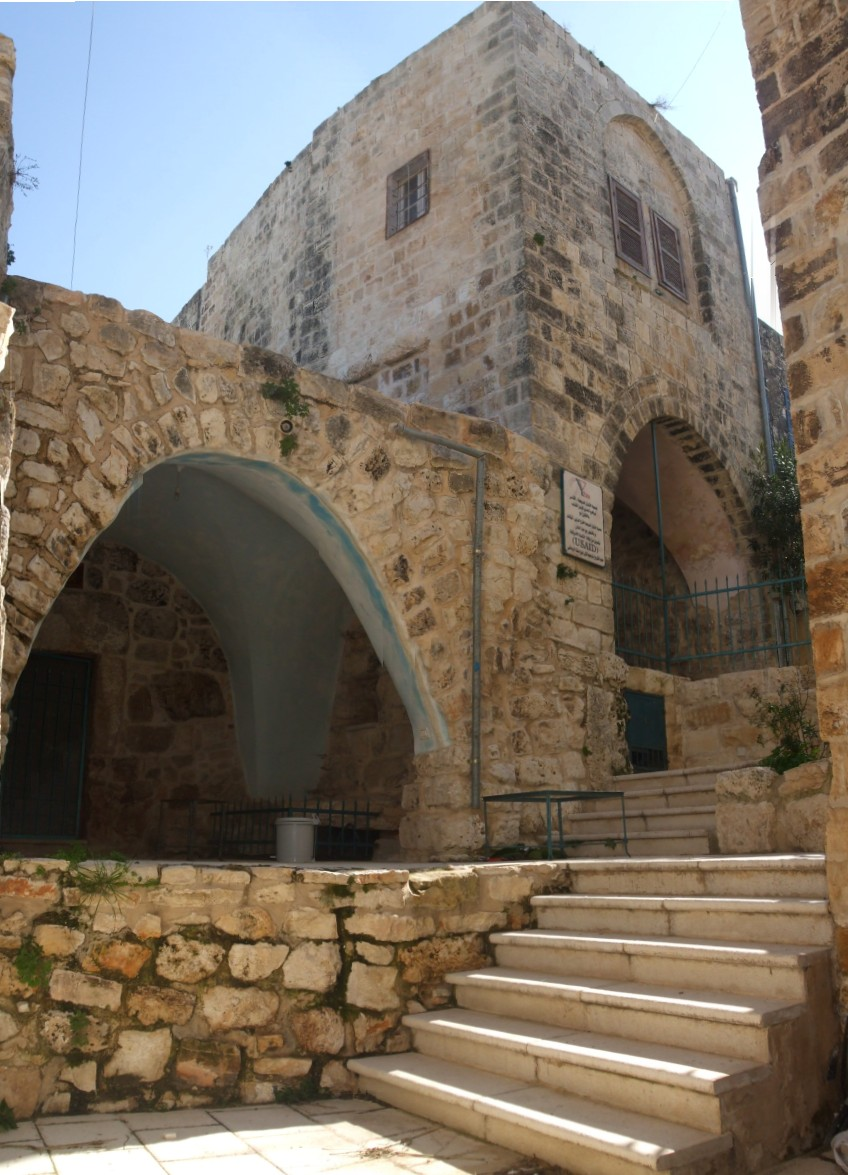
An old residence in Deir Istiya

The village was a part of Sanjak Nablus in the Ottoman period beginning in the early 16th century. In 1596, Dayr Istya appeared in Ottoman tax registers being in the Nahiya of Jabal Qubal, part of the Sanjak of Nablus. It had a population of 133 households and 12 bachelors, all Muslim. The villagers paid a fixed tax rate of 33.3% on various agricultural products, such as wheat, barley, summer crops, olives, goats and/or beehives; a total of 23,860 Akçe. Potsherds from the early Ottoman period have been also found here.

In the 18th and 19th centuries the village formed part of the highland region known as Jūrat ‘Amra or Bilād Jammā‘īn. According to historian Roy Marom, this area served "as a buffer zone between the political-economic-social units of the Jerusalem and the Nablus regions. On the political level, it suffered from instability due to the migration of the Bedouin tribes and the constant competition among local clans for the right to collect taxes on behalf of the Ottoman authorities."

In the early 17th century, Deir Istiya and nearby Beit Wazan were the ancestral seats of the Qasim family who controlled Jamma'in and most of eastern Sanjak Nablus. The Qasim fortified and made Deir Istiya their primary southern base. The Rayyan clan from Majdal Yaba also exercised some influence over the village. In 1838, Edward Robinson noted it as a village, Deir Estia, in the Jurat Merda district, south of Nablus.

During the "civil war" period in Jabal Nablus (1853–57), the Qasim family, formerly led by Qasim al-Ahmad, vacated Deir Istiya and were said to have sought refuge with the Nimr family in Nablus.

In the second half of the 19th century, the village was ruled by the Abu Hijleh clan (alternative spellings: Abu Hijleh or Abu Hijli), who continue to live there. The Abu Hijleh family were dominant in the area, and had great wealth. In 1870 French scholar Victor Guérin remarked that Deir Istiya had been much larger and that it was probably inhabited since "ancient times," noting that in the Mosque of Deir Istiya were marble columns (some with chiseled out crucifixes) dating back to the Christian era in Palestine.

In 1870/1871 (1288 AH) an Ottoman census listed the village with a large population of 172 households in the nahiya (sub-district) of Jamma'in al-Awwal, subordinate to Nablus.

In 1882 Deir Istiya was described as "a large village on high ground, surrounded with olive-groves, and supplied by cisterns."

=== British Mandate era ===
The British wrested control of Palestine from the Ottomans in 1917, and in 1921, a resident was publicly beat to death in Deir Istiya for allegedly possessing weapons. The British appointed the role of leadership to one branch of Abu Hijleh clan, fomenting rivalry with the other branch. The British established a school in the village in 1923. Having a school established in the area cemented Deir Istiya as one of the main villages in central-western Samaria.

In the 1922 census of Palestine Deir Istiya had a population of 674 inhabitants, all Muslim, rising to 886 in the 1931 census, still all Muslim, in a total of 206 houses.

In the 1945 statistics a population of 1,190 was recorded, still all Muslim, while the total land area was 34,164 dunams, according to an official land and population survey. Of this, 6,373 dunams were for plantations and irrigable land, 4,896 for cereals, while 65 dunams were classified as built-up areas.

=== Jordanian era ===
After the 1948 Arab-Israeli War, it was annexed by Jordan, and from 1950 to 1960, the Palestine Communist Party became prominent in the village earning it the local name of "Little Berlin."

In 1961, while a part of Jordan, there were 1,641 residents in Deir Istiya.

=== Post-1967 ===
During the 1967 Six-Day War between Israel and coalition of Arab states, the village was targeted by Israeli forces. Most of the inhabitants were rounded up, with the women in the mosque and the men in the school, and the mayor Jamal Abu Hijleh was ordered to implement Israeli orders in the village. Since the 1967 war, Deir Istiya has been held under Israeli occupation.

Throughout the first part of the occupation by Israel, from 1967 to 1990, nearly half of the population emigrated to Kuwait or other Persian Gulf States. In the 1970s local resistance in the form of sumud increased in the village, including the raising of Palestinian flags, graffiti, and blocking roads. As a result, in 1974, about 50 men were arrested and served prison terms ranging from six months to three years.

After the 1995 accords, 17% of village land was classified as Area B land, while the remaining 83% is Area C. Israel has expropriated land from Deir Istiya to construct several Israeli settlements:

- 951 dunams for Emmanuel,
- 920 dunams for Ginnot Shomeron,
- 659 dunams for Yakir,
- 625 dunams for Nofim,
- 512 dunams for Karne Shomron,
- 335 dunams for Revava,
- 69 dunams for Ma'ale Shomron

The Israel Nature and Parks Authority has established a nature reserve in the Wadi Qana, occupying privately owned Palestinian farmland which had been worked before the Israeli authorities declared it a park. In 2012 the Israeli Civil Administration ordered local villagers to uproot more than 1,000 olive trees from the area. The residents of Deir Istiya, are contesting the injunction in court. The park, they say, incorporates part of their land, and a double standard is being applied, with Israeli settlements permitted in the area, and a road to one of them built through the park itself.

== Islamic structures ==
The Mosque of Deir Istiya located in the middle of the village. It consists of three aisles, each having three bays and nearby are the remains of an ancient wall. To the west of the village is the Mosque of Nabi Allah Amisiya, which consists of two aisles and two bays. The mosque is adjacent to maqam (shrine) Istiya. It is a square chamber with a dome constructed of small stones. About 50 meters north of Deir Istiya is a shrine for Nabi Khatir who according to inscriptions, died in 1148 CE.

== Demographics ==
According to Victor Guerin in June 1870, Deir Istiya had roughly 400 inhabitants. In the 1922 census of Palestine it had a population of 674 inhabitants, all Muslim, rising to 886 in the 1931 census, still all Muslim, in a total of 206 houses. The Village Statistics, 1945, recorded a population of 1,190, still all Muslim.

In 1961, while a part of Jordan, there were 1,641 residents, decreasing drastically after its occupation by Israel with nearly half of the residents gradually emigrating mostly to Kuwait. In 1982, there were 1,500 people living in Deir Istiya, rising to 2,100 in 1987.

In a 1997 census carried out by the Palestinian Central Bureau of Statistics, Deir Istiya had a population of 2,802, of which only 2.1% were Palestinian refugees. Over half of the population is under the age of 20 (51.8%). People between the ages of 20 and 44 make up 33.3% of the population, 14.8% between 45 and 64, and 6% over the age of 65. According to the bureau's 2007 census, the town's population had increased to 3,106.

== Economy ==
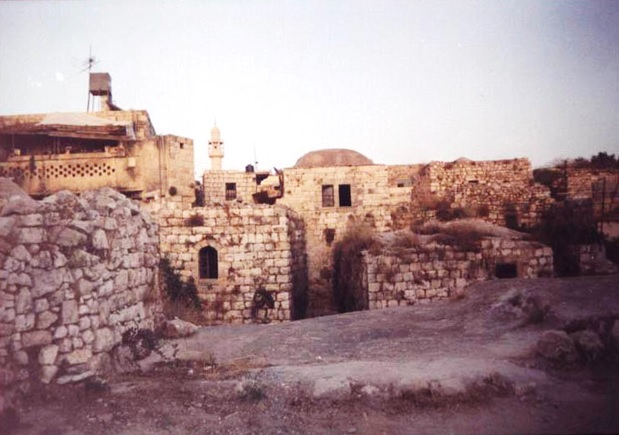
Old town of Deir Istiya

Compared to other villages in the Salfit District, Deir Istiya has a high percentage of professional workers (doctors, office workers, lawyers). About 20% of the people work in government related jobs, with the Palestinian National Authority, mostly police or teachers. Between 1967 and 1993, most of the working inhabitants were employed mainly in farming or labor in Israel, which the village was highly dependent upon. However, after Israel closed the border in 2000 due to the Second Intifada, most of these laborers turned to farming their own fields.

Deir Istiya has the largest land area in the Salfit Governorate, and the second largest in the West Bank after Tubas. Since the Intifada, agriculture – the backbone of the village's economy – has drastically been reduced. Prior to the violence, there were sixteen goat farms and nine dairy farms, decreasing to five goat farms and one dairy farm presently. Olive oil is the main commodity and there are vast amounts of olive trees. Most of the oil is either exported to the Gulf States or sold to Palestinian merchants. There have been moves, with foreign aid, to improve the quality of locally produced olive oil with the intention of marketing it as a high quality product in Europe under the Zaytoun Fairtrade label. This industry is, however, under pressure as a result of Israeli land confiscations and the destruction of olive groves. In particular, in April 2012, notice was served on Palestinian landowners for the destruction of some 1,400 olive trees.

Prior to the Intifada, 40 families raised livestock, but this dramatically decreased to just five families after the Intifada. Residents claim that the decrease was due to Israel's confiscation of 20,000 dunams of village lands, and fear of attack by Israeli settlers. In 2008, over 70% of the village was unemployed. There are three oil presses and two marble processing plants in Deir Istiya. Marble is supplied by Hebron, Jenin or imported from Italy. About 15 women are employed in a sewing factory where pieces are received and assembled.

== Government ==
A village council of eleven members administrates Deir Istiya. The members are nominated by the prominent families of the village, and are approved by the Palestinian National Authority. In the 2005 Palestinian municipal elections, Fatah won three seats, Hamas won three, the Communist Palestinian People's Party won three, including the mayoral seat, and a local group won two seats. Palestinian People's Party member Jamal Alfaris won the post of mayor.

== Families ==
The major families of Deir Istiya are the Abu Hijlehs, the Zidanes and the Al Qadis who none of which are native to Deir Istiya. The Abu Hijlehs come from an old Arab clan indigenous to Palestine called the Arab Al Sabeeheen who first settled in Kafr ad-Dik and then Deir Istiya and predate the arabisation of the Levant. The Zidanes originate from Hebron and are direct relatives to the Al Jaabari who are one of the biggest families of Hebron. The Al Qadis migrated from Marda into Deir Istiya but according to family history they originate from the Hejaz.

The minor families of Deir Istiya who are individually smaller than the aforementioned families still make up the majority when grouped and unlike the major ones are native. They are financially weaker and own less land and most of which are Falahi working in Wadi Qana.

Deir Istiya has a considerable diaspora. Inhabitants of Sanniriya and Biddya can trace their ancestry back to this village.

== Bibliography ==
- Barron, J.B., ed. (1923). Palestine: Report and General Abstracts of the Census of 1922. Government of Palestine.
- Canaan, T. (1927). Mohammedan Saints and Sanctuaries in Palestine. London: Luzac & Co.
- Conder, C.R.; Kitchener, H.H. (1882). The Survey of Western Palestine: Memoirs of the Topography, Orography, Hydrography, and Archaeology. Vol. 2. London: Committee of the Palestine Exploration Fund.
- Doumani, B. (1995). Rediscovering Palestine: Merchants and Peasants in Jabal Nablus, 1700–1900. University of California Press. ISBN 978-0-520-20370-9.
- Drory, Joseph (1988). "Hanbalis of the Nablus Region in the Eleventh and Twelfth Centuries". Asian and African Studies. 22: 93–112. Archived from the original on 2018-03-01.
- Ellenblum, R. (2003). Frankish Rural Settlement in the Latin Kingdom of Jerusalem. Cambridge University Press. ISBN 9780521521871.
- Finkelstein, I.; Lederman, Zvi, eds. (1997). Highlands of many cultures. Tel Aviv: Institute of Archaeology of Tel Aviv University Publications Section. ISBN 965-440-007-3.
- Government of Jordan, Department of Statistics (1964). First Census of Population and Housing. Volume I: Final Tables; General Characteristics of the Population (PDF).
- Government of Palestine, Department of Statistics (1945). Village Statistics, April, 1945.
- Guérin, V. (1875). Description Géographique Historique et Archéologique de la Palestine. Vol 2 Samarie; pt. 2. (p. 173)
- Hadawi, S. (1970). Village Statistics of 1945: A Classification of Land and Area ownership in Palestine. Palestine Liberation Organization Research Center.
- Hütteroth, W.-D.; Abdulfattah, K. (1977). Historical Geography of Palestine, Transjordan and Southern Syria in the Late 16th Century. Erlanger Geographische Arbeiten, Sonderband 5. Erlangen, Germany: Vorstand der Fränkischen Geographischen Gesellschaft. ISBN 3-920405-41-2.
- Mills, E., ed. (1932). Census of Palestine 1931. Population of Villages, Towns and Administrative Areas. Jerusalem: Government of Palestine.
- Moudjir ed-dyn (1876). Sauvaire (ed.). Histoire de Jérusalem et d'Hébron depuis Abraham jusqu'à la fin du XVe siècle de J.-C. : fragments de la Chronique de Moudjir-ed-dyn.
- Palmer, E.H. (1881). The Survey of Western Palestine: Arabic and English Name Lists Collected During the Survey by Lieutenants Conder and Kitchener, R. E. Transliterated and Explained by E.H. Palmer. Committee of the Palestine Exploration Fund.
- Robinson, E.; Smith, E. (1841). Biblical Researches in Palestine, Mount Sinai and Arabia Petraea: A Journal of Travels in the year 1838. Vol. 3. Boston: Crocker & Brewster.
- Schölch, A. (1993). Palestine in Transformation, 1856–1882: Studies in Social, Economic, and Political Development (PDF). Institute for Palestine Studies. ISBN 978-0-88728-234-8.
- Sharon, M. (2004). Corpus Inscriptionum Arabicarum Palaestinae, D-F. Vol. 3. BRILL. ISBN 90-04-13197-3.
