= Helmer Ringgren =

Swedish theologian (1917–2012)

Karl Vilhelm Helmer Ringgren (November 29, 1917 – March 26, 2012), was a Swedish theologian.

He became associate professor in Religion at Uppsala University, 1947–59, and Acting Professor of Old Testament exegesis at the Åbo Akademi University, 1947–56, the professor of Old Testament exegesis at the Garrett Biblical Institute, Evanston, Illinois, 1960–62, professor of comparative religion at Åbo Akademi University in Turku, Finland, 1962–64, and then Old Testament exegesis at Uppsala University, 1964–83. Ringgren died on March 26, 2012.

He was a fellow of the Norwegian Academy of Science and Letters from 1979.

== Bibliography ==
- Word and Wisdom (1947)
- Islam, Aslama and Muslim (1949)
- Fatalism in Persian Epics (1952)
- Messias, konungen (1953)
- Studies in Arabian Fatalism (1955)
- Handskrifterna från Qumran IV-V (1956)
- Psaltarens fromhet (1957)
- Religionerna i historia och nutid (together with Åke V. Ström 1957)
- Tro och liv enligt Dödahavsrullarna (1961)
- Sacrifice in the Bible (1962)
- Israelitische Religion (1963)
- Främre Orientens religioner (1967)
- Theological Dictionary of the Old Testament Gerhard Johannes Botterweck, Helmer Ringgren, Heinz-Josef Fabry translated David E. Green.
