= Kanah =

Kanah is a toponym used in two distinct geographical contexts in the Hebrew Bible.

== Border river between tribes ==
Kanah (Hebrew: קָנָה, lit. 'reedy; brook of reeds'), in the KJV the Brook Kanah, is a stream referred to in the Hebrew Bible forming the boundary between Ephraim and Manasseh, from the Mediterranean Sea eastward to Tappuah (Joshua 16:8).

It has been identified variously with:

- Wadi Qana, a wadi in the northern West Bank, crossing into Israel at Jaljulia, and flowing into the Yarkon River before this reaches the sea. It is generally seen as the biblical 'brook of Kanah'.
- The sedgy streams that constitute the Wady Talaik, which enters the sea between Joppa and Caesarea Maritima. The stream rises southwest of Shechem near modern Nablus, flows through Wady Ishkar and joining Yarkon/Aujeh River, soon reaching the sea north of Jaffa.
- The Yarkon (Hebrew) or Auja/Aujeh River (Arabic)

== Town of Kanah ==
The Book of Joshua also refers to a town named Kanah in the north of the territory of the tribe of Asher (Joshua 19:28). It has been identified with 'Ain-Kana, a village on the brow of a valley some 7 miles (11 km) southeast of Tyre. About a mile north of this place are many colossal ruins strewn about, and in the side of a neighbouring ravine are figures of men, women, and children cut in the face of the rock and supposed to be of Phoenician origin.
