= Palestine Museum of Natural History =

Natural history museum in Bethlehem, West Bank, Palestine

- متحف فلسطين للتاريخ الطبيعي
- Established: April 12, 2017
- Coordinates: 31.7178°N 35.2055°E
- Type: Natural history
- Founders: Mazin and Jesse Qumsiyeh
- Director: Mazin Qumsiyeh
- Employees: 10
- Website: palestinenature.org/natural-history/

The Palestine Museum of Natural History (Note: Not to be confused with The Palestinian Museum of Natural History and Humankind, which is an art installation by Khalil Rabah) (PMNH; Arabic: متحف فلسطين للتاريخ الطبيعي, romanized: Matḥaf Filasṭīn lil-Tārīkh al-Ṭabīʻī) is a natural history museum in Bethlehem, West Bank, Palestine. Founded in 2013, it opened to the public in 2017. The museum collections focus on botany, zoology and entomology. The goals of the museum include research, collecting and education to record and amplify the importance of Palestine's biodiversity and environmental heritage.

== Location ==
It is part of Bethlehem University and is closely linked to the Palestine Institute for Biodiversity and Sustainability. As of 2019 it had 10 full-time staff, both Palestinian and Israeli. The museum also features a botanic garden, a wildlife rehabilitation centre, and an aviary. The museum also runs educational programs for children.

== History ==
The museum opened to the public on 12 April 2017 and is the first of its kind in Palestine. Its collection began to be established in 2014 by Mazin Qumsiyeh, who many years previously had recognised the need for an archive of Palestinian biodiversity and research programmes to understand its significance. The initial foundation costs were supported by Mazin and Jesse Qumsiyeh and Bethlehem University: with $250,000 donation from the former, supported by $450,000 by the latter.

== Collections and research ==
Building a collection of Palestine's biodiversity is a core aim of the museum, and field-based research has assembled the collection. One project collected ten species of freshwater snails from Palestine, which were accession into the museum collection. The freshwater mollusca collection expanded and now includes the first record of Planorbella duryi, an invasive species in Palestine, from the museum's own pond. Another research programme recorded the biodiversity and unique species at the protected site of Wadi Qana, the only known site of Pelobates syriacus in the West Bank.

The entomological collection includes Cetoniinae species from the occupied West Bank, as well as building a collection of 340 grasshopper and locust species, a teratological example of Nezara viridula from the museum garden, and the first Palestinian record of the invasive species Cacyreus marshalli. Another find from the museum garden is the first record of a "bat ensnared by a plant in the Arab world". The bat, Pipistrellus kuhlii, was caught in Picris altissima L. Delile.

The collection also includes geology, with a discrete assemblage of molluscan and echinoderm fossils collected at Beit Ummar. The botany collection includes examples of Orchidaceae, and macrofungi in the museum's herbarium collection. One vertebrate species collected is an unusual specimen of Heremites vittata.

Museum biologist, Mohammed Abusarhan, describes the PMNH's work as:

"Our work at the Palestine Museum of Natural History deepens our knowledge of the Palestinian ecology and environment. We make field trips to collect samples to study biodiversity in Palestine and publish scientific papers that are the first of their kind in Palestine."

— Mohammed Abusarhan, Natural history, conservation and politics meet in West Bank museum (2019)

The museum has conducted research on the impact on biodiversity of Israeli settlement and the subsequent effects of pollution associated with this expansion. One study examined changes to the diet of eagle owls locally, which suggested a decrease in biodiversity in the region.

As of 2019, the museum was home to over 260 plant specimens, and had just opened an exhibition, funded by the British Council, on collecting Palestinian agricultural heritage through objects and oral histories. Other cultural research undertaken by the museum includes changes in traditional knowledge of wild plants in Artas.

The museum itself has also been the subject of research examining the role of botanic gardens as sites of nation-building and resistance.

== See also ==
- List of museums in the State of Palestine
