= Alonei Shilo =

Israeli outpost in the West Bank

Alonei Shilo: אלוני שילה (Hebrew)
- Etymology: Shilo Oaks
- Location within the Northern West Bank
- Coordinates: 32.163°N 35.120°E
- Country: Israel
- District: Judea and Samaria Area
- Council: Shomron
- Region: West Bank
- Founded: 1999

Alonei Shilo (Hebrew: אלוני שילה, lit. 'Shilo Oaks') is an Israeli outpost in the West Bank. Located near Karnei Shomron, the outpost was established in 1999. It was initially named Nof Kaneh (Hebrew: נוף קנה, lit. Kaneh View), after nearby Kaneh stream, but was later renamed after Shilo Levi, an Israeli soldier who was killed in the 1997 Israeli helicopter disaster, when two Israeli helicopters crashed in mid-air.

The international community considers Israeli settlements in the West Bank illegal under international law, whereas Israeli outposts, like Alonei Shilo, are considered illegal both under international law as well as under Israeli law.
