= Mazin Qumsiyeh =

Palestinian-American writer and museum director

- مازن قُمصية
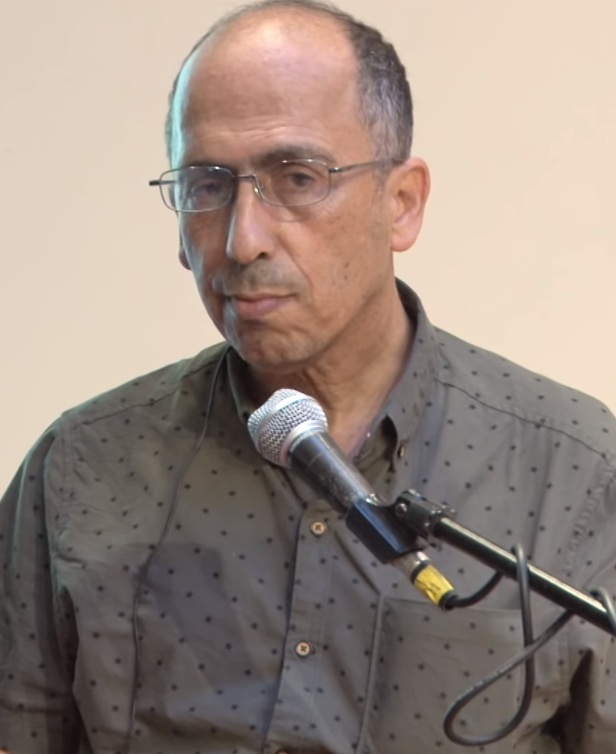
- Mazin Qumsiyeh talks about his book, "Popular Resistance in Palestine", Boston, Jun 2018
- Born: 1957 (age 68–69); Beit Sahour, Jordanian West Bank
- Occupations: author and academic

Mazin Butros Qumsiyeh (Arabic: مازن بطرس قُمصية, born 1957 in Beit Sahour) is a Palestinian-American scientist and author, founder and director of the Palestine Museum of Natural History (PMNH) and the Palestine Institute for Biodiversity and Sustainability (PIBS) at Bethlehem University where he teaches. After serving on the faculties of the University of Tennessee (1989–1993), Duke University (1993–1999), and Yale University (1999–2005), he now researches and teaches at Bethlehem and Birzeit Universities since 2008. Here Qumsiyeh joined with other professors to introduce the first Biotechnology Masters program in the region. Over the course of his career he has published well over 150 scientific papers on topics ranging from cultural heritage to biodiversity in addition to several books. He also serves on the board of a number of Palestinian youth and service organizations such as Al-Rowwad Children Theater and Siraj Center.

== Education ==
Mazin Qumsiyeh received a B.S. in Biology from the University of Jordan in 1978, before getting a Masters in Zoology – specializing in Systematic and Evolutionary Biology – from the University of Connecticut in 1982. He completed a PhD in Zoology/Genetics from Texas Tech University in 1986 and went on to do a Clinical Cytogenetics fellowship with the Department of Pediatrics at the University of Tennessee (1991) and a Clinical Molecular Genetics fellowship with Duke University (1998). As a result he was certified by the American Board of Medical Genetics in two specialties: Clinical Cytogenetics and Molecular Genetics.

== Career ==
After receiving his PhD, Qumsiyeh worked on mechanisms of gene amplification as a research fellow with St. Jude Children's Research Hospital from 1987 to 1989. He joined Memphis State University's Department of Biology as an Adjunct Assistant Professor in 1988 where he taught a course on Embryology before departing in 1993. In collaboration with D. P. Suttle, he rejoined St. Jude Children's Research Hospital as a consultant with the Department of Pharmacology from 1989 to 1991. In 1990 he became a research associate at the Mammals Section of the Carnegie Museum of Natural History where he worked for nine years while also serving as the Cytogenetics Laboratory Director, Department Head, and Interim Director for the T. C. Thompson Children's Hospital (1991–1994).

From 1995 to 1999 he served as the Director of Cytogenetics Services and Associate Clinical Professor with the Departments of Pathology, Pediatrics, OB/GYN, and Genetics at Duke University Medical Center. Then he joined Yale University as the Director of Cytogenetics Services and Associate Clinical Professor with the Department of Genetics from 1999 to 2004. Qumsiyeh became a member of the Yale Cancer Center during this time. After 2004 he became director of SiParadigm Inc.'s Cytogenetics Services where the laboratory conducted testing for breast and hematologic cancer research.

Returning to Palestine in 2008, Qumsiyeh became a part-time professor and thesis advisor at Bethlehem University while also teaching Advanced Molecular biology as an adjunct professor with Birzeit University. In 2014 he founded the Palestine Museum of Natural History and Palestine Institute of Biodiversity and Sustainability with Bethlehem University using $250,000 in funding donated by him and his wife. He serves as director of both institutions and has focused their programs on outreach, empowerment, and education efforts with great success.

=== Palestine Museum of Natural History and Palestine Institute of Biodiversity and Sustainability ===
PMNH'S school programs work with students at mixed and single gender schools to develop environmental clubs which plant gardens and recycle while also promoting entrepreneurship projects that give back to their communities. Emphasizing a philosophy of respect, PMNH'S volunteers, staff, and participants are encouraged to respect themselves, others, and the environment by creating and maintaining a healthy sustainable environment for all living things. Working in conjunction with the Ministry of Health and the Environmental Quality Authority, PMNH is developing new ways to educate and empower women to create a healthier environment that increases local productivity via ecotourism, permaculture, and home-based projects. PMNH's staff also worked with the Ministry of Women's Affairs to start an educational empowerment program for women in rural communities.

The institutions' efforts have attracted volunteers locally and internationally. Volunteers and grant funding have enabled PMNH to develop educational modules for youth and adults to help them protect endangered ecosystems. Employing interactive and experiential approaches to learning, the museum organises exhibits, nature-oriented field trips, and botanical and community gardens. Qumsiyeh leads an ongoing project funded by the Darwin Initiative to benefit over 200 farmers, and oversaw another project funded by the British Council which employed researchers and volunteers for gathering, preserving, and using aspects of cultural heritage to meet sustainability goals.

=== Activism ===
In the early 2000s Qumsiyeh became more active in political and social causes, particularly Palestinian rights. He has been interviewed by The Washington Post, The New York Times, and The Boston Globe, as well the CNBC and ABC news networks. Since 2003 he has served as Vice President of the Middle East Crisis Committee and in 2000 he cofounded al-Awda, the Palestine Right to Return Coalition, where he was national treasurer and media coordinator until 2004. While living in North Carolina, he was the Media Coordinator for the Arab American Anti-Discrimination Committee, and from 2003 until 2008 he was the Media Coordinator for the Palestinian American Congress' Connecticut chapter. Additionally, he co-founded the Academics for Justice and Boycott Israeli Goods campaigns. From 2005 until 2007 he was a steering committee member of the US Campaign to End the Occupation and the Association for One Democratic State in Israel/Palestine. In the course of his activism Qumsiyeh was arrested in May 2010 and 2011 in Al-Walaja.

He has lectured and presented on human rights around the world such as: the NATO Defense College, St. Edward's University, the Harvard Kennedy School of Government, the Ubud Writers & Readers Festival, SOAS, Boston College, the Palestinian American Council, the Rhodes Forum, Brown University, the Munich Rachel Carson Center, Leipzig University Institute of Oriental Studies, Yale University's Calhoun College, and many others. Past lecture topics range from human rights, Palestinian resistance and empowerment, the Israeli-Palestinian Struggle, and the one state solution.

== Recognition ==
In 2020, Qumsiyeh was a laureate of the Paul K. Feyerabend Award, which honors exceptionally successful work for solidarity within or between communities and acknowledges remarkable accomplishments that represent a true source of inspiration. That same year, Qumsiyeh was also a Takreem Foundation laureate for his work on Environmental Development and Sustainability.

In October 2011, Qumsiyeh was honored with the Social Courage Award from the Peace and Justice Studies Association at the Joint Conference of PJSA and the Gandhi King Conference in Memphis, Tennessee. Montana Peace Seekers Network recognized his international efforts by naming him Peace Seeker of the Year for 2013. Arab World Books included him in their March 2008 selection of writers "who have enriched our pages with their creative writings and enlightened us with their progressive thinking". The American-Arab Anti-Discrimination Committee also honored Qumsiyeh with the Alex Odeh Award. Al-Awda's Connecticut Chapter awarded the 2005 Activism Award to Qumsiyeh and a year prior he was recognized by the American Friends Service Committee's Connecticut Chapter. The American-Arab Anti-Discrimination Committee awarded their 1997 Raymond Jallow Activism Award to him as well.

== Books ==
Qumsiyeh is the author of four books:

- Qumsiyeh, Mazin (2011). Popular resistance in Palestine : a history of hope and empowerment. London New York: Pluto Press Distributed in the United States of America by Palgrave Macmillan. ISBN 978-0-7453-3069-3. OCLC 730502342.
- Qumsiyeh, Mazin (2004). Sharing the land of Canaan : human rights and the Israeli-Palestinian struggle. London Ann Arbor, MI: Pluto Press University of Michigan Press. ISBN 0-7453-2248-4. OCLC 646382087.
- Qumsiyeh, Mazin (1996). Mammals of the Holy Land. Lubbock: Texas Tech University Press. ISBN 978-0-89672-364-1. OCLC 34321675.
- Qumsiyeh, Mazin (1985). The bats of Egypt. Lubbock, Tex: Texas Tech Press. ISBN 0-89672-138-8. OCLC 13152431.

== See also ==
- Palestine Museum of Natural History (PMNH)
