= Heinz-Josef Fabry =

German hebraist

Heinz-Josef Fabry (born in Winterberg on 14 December 1944) is a German Hebraist and deacon of the Catholic Theological Faculty of Bonn University. Following the death of his teacher Gerhard Johannes Botterweck in 1981 he was co-editor of the 15 volume Theological dictionary of the Old Testament with the Swedish scholar Helmer Ringgren (translated into English by David E. Green). He is also author of various studies on the Dead Sea Scrolls.
