= Kafr Laqif =

- Local Development Committee

Arabic transcription(s)
  - Arabic: كفر لاقف
- Location of Kafr Laqif within Palestine
- Coordinates: 32°10′58″N 35°05′26″E
- Palestine grid: 158/176
- State: State of Palestine
- Governorate: Qalqilya

Government
  - Type: Local Development Committee
- Elevation: 342 m (1,122 ft)

Population (2017)
  - Total: 1,039
- Name meaning: The village of Lakif, meaning a ruinous structure, especially a well or cistern.

Kafr Laqif (Arabic: كفر لاقف) is a Palestinian village in the Qalqilya Governorate in the western West Bank, located 22 kilometers southwest of Nablus. According to the Palestinian Central Bureau of Statistics, the village had a population of 1,039 inhabitants in 2017.

== Location ==
Kafr Laqif is located 12.04 kilometers (7.48 mi) (horizontally) east of Qalqiliya. It is bordered by Hajja to the east, Wadi Qana to the south, ‘Azzun to the west, and Khirbet Sir and Baqat al-Hatab to the north.

== History ==
Byzantine-period ceramics have been found there.

=== Ottoman period ===
Kafr Laqif, like all of Palestine, was incorporated into the Ottoman Empire in 1517, and in the 1596 tax registers it was part of the nahiya ("subdistrict") of Bani Sa'b, itself part of the larger Sanjak of Nablus. It had a population of 15 households, all Muslims. The inhabitants paid a fixed tax rate of 33,3% on agricultural products, including wheat, barley, summer crops, olive trees, goats and beehives, in addition to occasional revenues and a fixed tax for people of Nablus area; a total of 10,740 akçe. 37.5% of the revenue went to a Muslim charitable endowment.

In 1838, Robinson noted Kefr Lakif as a Muslim village in the Beni Sa'ab district, west of Nablus.

In 1870/71 (AH 1288), an Ottoman census listed the village in the nahiya (sub-district) of Bani Sa'b.

In 1882, the PEF's Survey of Western Palestine (SWP) described Kefr Lekif as resembling Kafr Jammal, that is: "a small stone village on a knoll, with cisterns."

=== British Mandate ===
In the 1922 census of Palestine conducted by the British Mandate authorities, Kufr Laqef had a population of 95 Muslims, increasing in the 1931 census to 141 Muslims, in 27 houses.

In the 1945 statistics the population of Kafr Laqif was 210 Muslims, while the total land area was 2,854 dunams, according to an official land and population survey. Of this, 477 were allocated for plantations and irrigable land, 840 for cereals, while 19 dunams were classified as built-up (urban) areas.

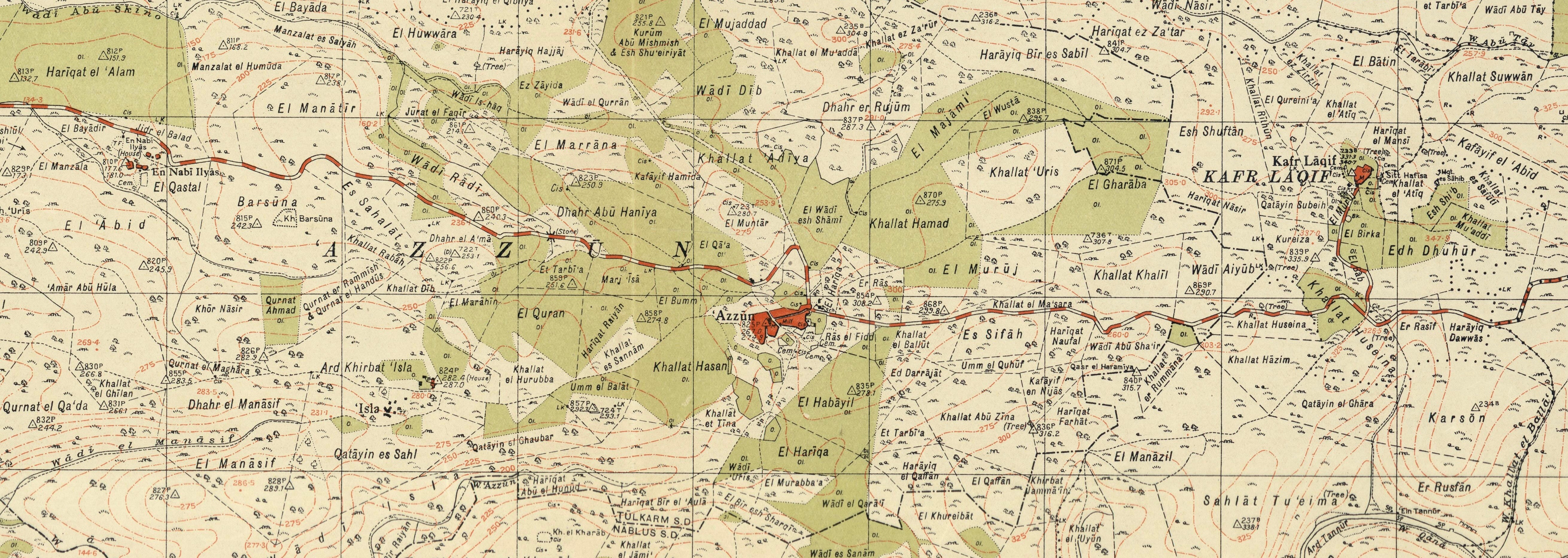
Kafr Laqif 1943 1:20,000

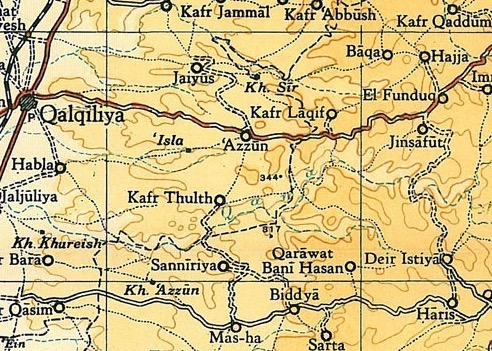
Kafr Laqif 1945 1:250,000

=== Jordanian period ===
In the wake of the 1948 Arab–Israeli War, and after the 1949 Armistice Agreements, Kafr Laqif came under Jordanian rule.

The Jordanian census of 1961 found 304 inhabitants.

=== Post 1967 ===
During the Six-Day War in 1967, Kafr Laqif came under Israeli occupation.

After the 1995 accords, 28.2% of village land is classified as Area B land, while the remaining 71.8% is classified as Area C land. The Israelis have expropriated land in Kafr Laqif for its settlements, most notably Karne Shomron and its environs. In addition, according to the plans, (as of 2007) the Israeli West Bank barrier will isolate 657 dunums (22.8% of the village's total area) on the western Israeli side of the wall.

== Archaeology ==
Remains of a classical-era structure known locally as el-Burj are located on the northeastern heights of Kafr Laqif. The surviving portion includes a wall approximately 10 meters long and up to 4–5 meters high, built with drafted masonry indicative of a sizable and prominent building. Adjacent to the structure is a vaulted cellar constructed from dressed stone. Second Temple-period rock-cut tombs have been identified on the same hill slope. Archaeological findings from the site include remains from the Early Iron Age, Hellenistic, and Herodian periods. A well-paved, rock-cut road links the village to the nearby springs at 'Ein Tanur. These features, according to archaeologist Shimon Dar, suggest that Kafr Laqif may have functioned as a local administrative center or citadel during Hellenistic times.

== Bibliography ==
- Barron, J.B., ed. (1923). Palestine: Report and General Abstracts of the Census of 1922. Government of Palestine.
- Conder, C.R.; Kitchener, H.H. (1882). The Survey of Western Palestine: Memoirs of the Topography, Orography, Hydrography, and Archaeology. Vol. 2. London: Committee of the Palestine Exploration Fund.
- Dar, Shimon (1986). Landscape and Pattern: An Archaeological Survey of Samaria 800 BCE–636 CE. B.A.R. International Series. Vol. 308. Oxford. pp. 234–235.
- Dauphin, C. (1998). La Palestine byzantine, Peuplement et Populations. BAR International Series 726 (in French). Vol. III : Catalogue. Oxford: Archeopress. ISBN 0-860549-05-4.
- Government of Jordan, Department of Statistics (1964). First Census of Population and Housing. Volume I: Final Tables; General Characteristics of the Population (PDF).
- Government of Palestine, Department of Statistics (1945). Village Statistics, April, 1945.
- Hadawi, S. (1970). Village Statistics of 1945: A Classification of Land and Area ownership in Palestine. Palestine Liberation Organization Research Center.
- Hütteroth, W.-D.; Abdulfattah, K. (1977). Historical Geography of Palestine, Transjordan and Southern Syria in the Late 16th Century. Erlanger Geographische Arbeiten, Sonderband 5. Erlangen, Germany: Vorstand der Fränkischen Geographischen Gesellschaft. ISBN 3-920405-41-2.
- Mills, E., ed. (1932). Census of Palestine 1931. Population of Villages, Towns and Administrative Areas. Jerusalem: Government of Palestine.
- Palmer, E.H. (1881). The Survey of Western Palestine: Arabic and English Name Lists Collected During the Survey by Lieutenants Conder and Kitchener, R. E. Transliterated and Explained by E.H. Palmer. Committee of the Palestine Exploration Fund.
- Robinson, E.; Smith, E. (1841). Biblical Researches in Palestine, Mount Sinai and Arabia Petraea: A Journal of Travels in the year 1838. Vol. 3. Boston: Crocker & Brewster.
