= G. Johannes Botterweck =

Biblical scholar (1917–1981)

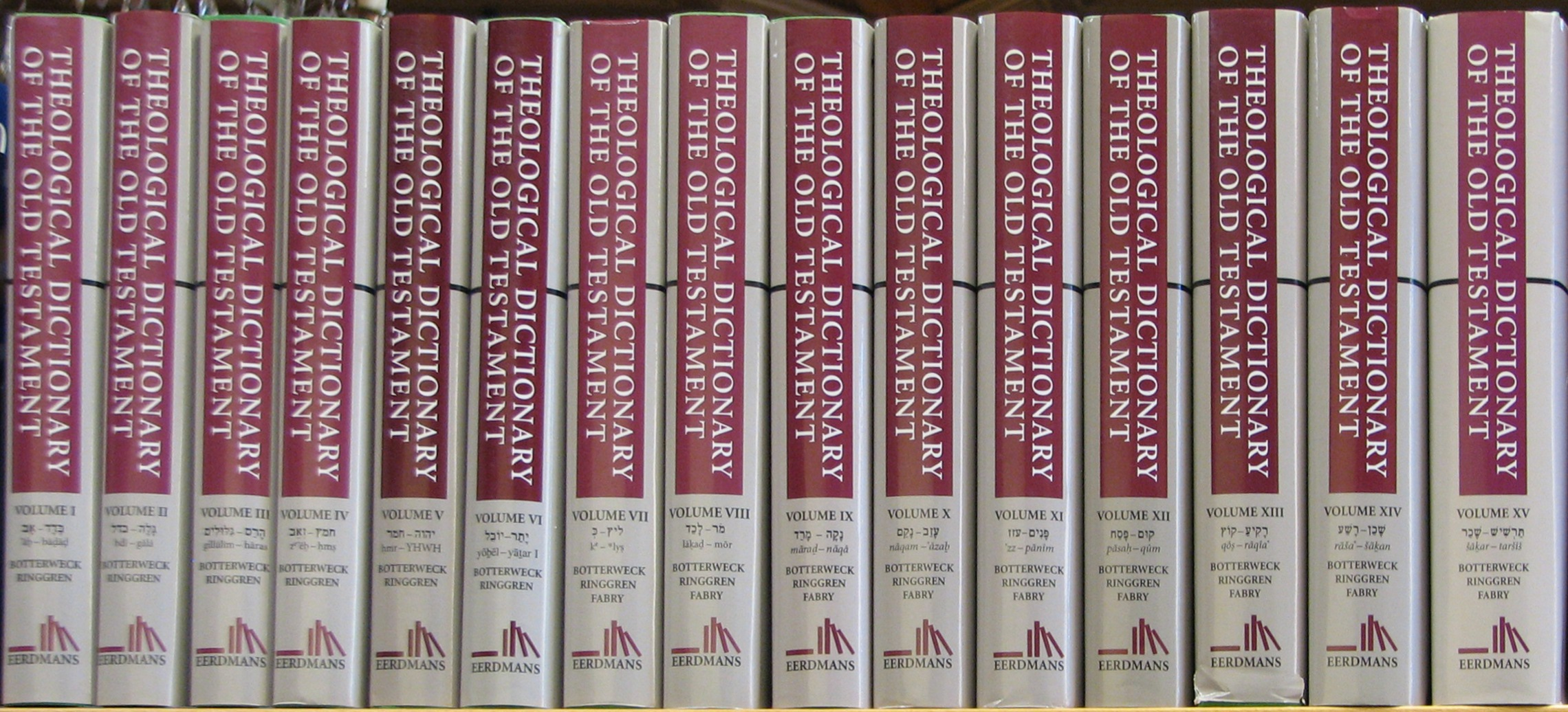
Theological Dictionary of the Old Testament. edited by G. Johannes Botterweck, Helmer Ringgren, Heinz-Josef Fabry. Eerdmans Pub Co; 1995.

Gerhard Johannes Botterweck (25 April 1917, in Rheydt – 15 Ajpril 1981, in Bonn) was a German theologian, Old Testament scholar and dean of the Catholic Theological Faculty of the University of Bonn. He is best known for his multi volume work the Theological Dictionary of the Old Testament.

== Life and work ==
Botterweck studied philosophy, Catholic theology, and oriental studies in Frankfurt and Vienna. In 1944 he received his doctorate in Vienna, Ph.D. and the same year was ordained a priest. While a military chaplain on the Eastern Front (World War II) he lost a leg. He was chaplain and religion teacher at Viersen (Diocese of Aachen). In 1950, his doctoral (PhD) promotion was followed by a Doctorate of Divinity, and in 1953 habilitation in Bonn. From 1953 to 1959 he was professor of Old Testament at Tübingen, then from 1960 to 1981 in Bonn. His scientific interests were concerned with the semantics and the philology of the biblical languages, the social criticism of the Prophets and the theology of the Psalms.

Among the pupils of Botterweck were Heinz-Josef Fabry, who completed his dictionary, Manfred Görg, Eric Kettenhofen, Joseph Plöger and Franz-Josef Stendebach.

== Works ==
- Die Bibel und ihre Welt. Eine Enzyklopädie zur Heiligen Schrift in zwei Bänden;
- Alttestamentliche Studien. Friedrich Nötscher zum sechzigsten Geburtstage 19. Juli 1950; ed. by Hubert Junker und Gerhard Johannes Botterweck. Hanstein, Bonn 1950
- „Gott erkennen“ im Sprachgebrauch des Alten Testaments; BBB 2. Hanstein, Bonn 1951; Dissertation of 3 July 1950 at the Catholic Faculty of the University of Bonn
- Der Triliterismus im Semitischen. Erläutert an den Wurzeln gl, kl, ql; BBB 3. Hanstein, Bonn 1952
- Festschrift für Prof. Dr. Viktor Christian. Gewidmet von Kollegen und Schülern zum 70. Geburtstag; ed. Viktor Christian, Kurt Schubert, Gerhard Johannes Botterweck. Notring der Wissenschaftlichen Verbände Österreichs, Wien 1956
- Apokalyptik; ed. G. Cornefeld and Gerhard Johannes Botterweck; in: BIW 1; Bergisch Gladbach: 1969; S. 59–67
- Auslegung von Maleachi 1,2-10; 2,1-16; 3,13-21. In: BiLe 1 (1960), S. 28–38, 100–109, 179–185, 253–260
- Form- und überlieferungsgeschichtliche Studie zum Dekalog. In: Conciliurn 1 (1965), S. 392–401
- Israels Errettung im Wunder am Meer. Glaube und Geschichte in den Auszugstraditionen von Ex 13,17-14,31. In: BiLe 8 (1967), S. 8–33
- Das Zelt der Begegnung. Untersuchung zur Gestalt der sakralen Zelttraditionen Altisraels; hrsg. von Gerhard Johannes Botterweck und H. Zimmermann. BBB 27, Bonn 1967
- Theologisches Wörterbuch zum Alten Testament (in trans. Theological Dictionary of the Old Testament), 10 Bände; hrsg. von Gerhard Johannes Botterweck und Helmer Ringgren. Kohlhammer, Stuttgart u. a. 1973–2001
- Mix halam. In: TWAT II, S. 989.

== Literature ==
- Bausteine biblischer Theologie. Festgabe für G. Johannes Botterweck zum 60. Geburtstag dargebracht von seinen Schülern. Hanstein, Köln und Bonn 1977
- Kürschners deutscher Gelehrten-Kalender. de Gruyter, Berlin 1980, 13th ed., p. 387. ISSN 0341-8049
- Heinz-Josef Fabry: Botterweck, Gerhard Johannes. In: LThK³, Bd. 2, Sp. 614
- Helen Schüngel-Straumann: Meine Wege und Umwege. Eine feministische Theologin unterwegs. Autobiografie. Paderborn u.a. 2011.
