= Karnei Shomron =

Israeli settlement in the West Bank

Karnei Shomron: קַרְנֵי שׁוֹמְרוֹן; كرني شمرون
- Local council

Hebrew transcription(s)
  - ISO 259: Qarnei Šomron
  - Also spelled: Qarne Shomron (official)
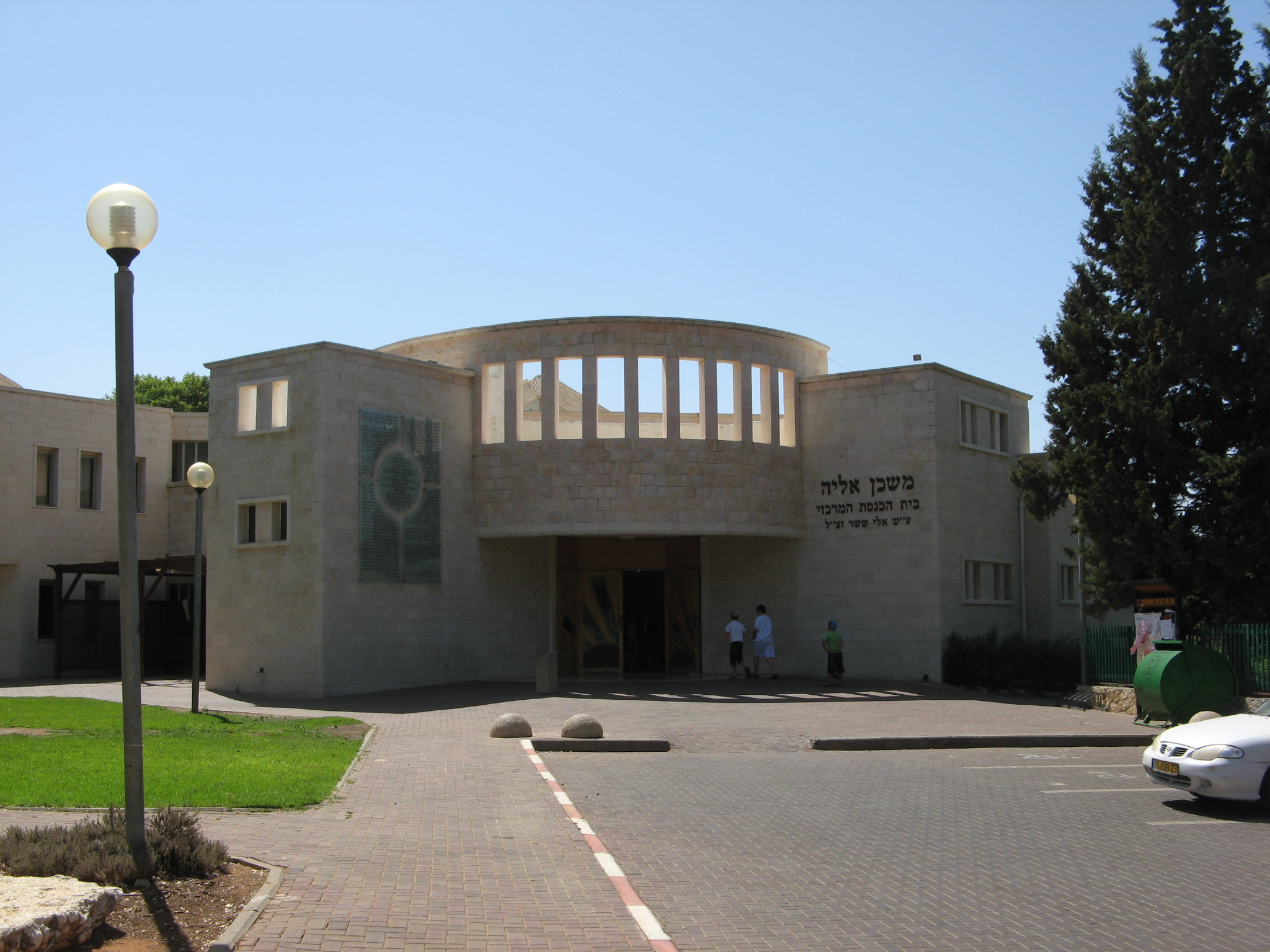
- Central Synagogue

- Location within the Northern West Bank
- Coordinates: 32°10′18″N 35°5′52″E
- Region: West Bank
- District: Judea and Samaria Area
- Founded: 1977

Government
  - Head of Municipality: Yehonatan Kuznitz

Area
  - Total: 7,179 dunams (7.179 km^{2}; 2.772 sq mi)

Population (2024)
  - Total: 10,541
  - Density: 1,468/km^{2} (3,803/sq mi)
- Website: www.karneishomron.co.il

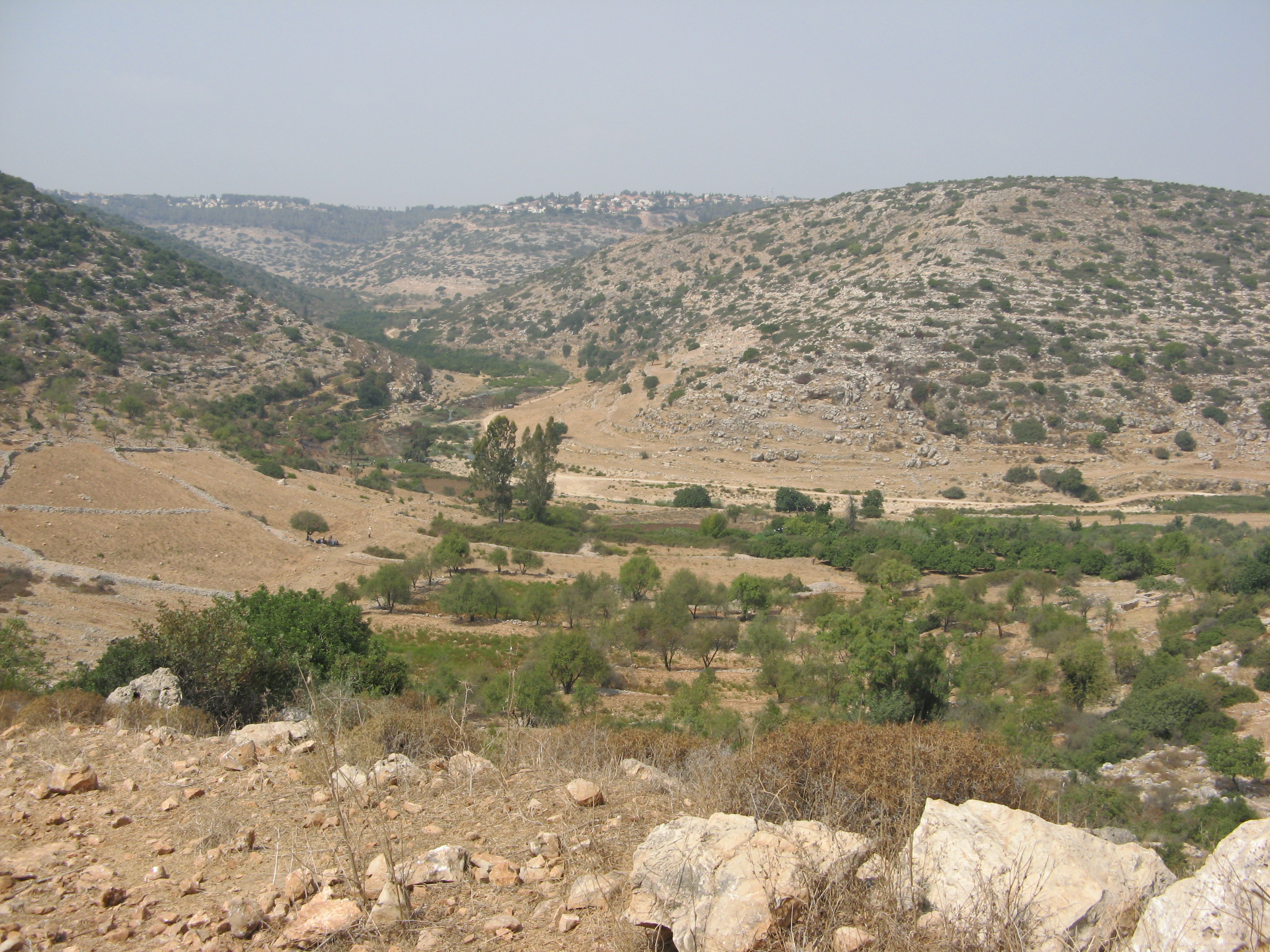
View of Nahal Kana

Karnei Shomron (Hebrew: קַרְנֵי שׁוֹמְרוֹן, lit. "Rays (of light) of Samaria") is an Israeli settlement organized as a local council established in 1977 in the West Bank, east of Kfar Saba. Karnei Shomron is located 48 kilometres (30 mi) northeast of Tel Aviv and 85 kilometres (53 mi) north of Jerusalem. In 2024 it had a population of 10,541.

The international community considers Israeli settlements in the West Bank illegal under international law, but the Israeli government disputes this.

== History and archaeology ==
=== Confiscation of Palestinian land ===
According to ARIJ, Israel confiscated land from four nearby Palestinian villages of in order to construct Karnei Shomron:

- 713 dunams from Jinsafut
- 512 dunams from Deir Istiya
- 229 dunams from Kafr Laqif
- 216 dunams from Hajjah.

=== Local Council neighborhoods ===
In 1991, several Israeli settlements were merged to become a single municipality called Karnei Shomron Local Council:

- Karnei Shomron – established in 1977, 450 families
- Ginot Shomron – established in 1984, 850 families
- Neve Menachem/Neve Oramin – established in 1991, 220 families
- Alonei Shilo – established in 1999, 25 families

Also part of Karnei Shomron are:

- Mitzpe Tzvaim
- Midreshet Shilat, a midrasha for girls
- Ramat Gil'ad
- Neve Aliza, a religious neighborhood of American-style homes founded by new immigrants from the United States and Canada in 1985

=== Nature ===
The town borders Wadi Qana, a wadi marking the border between lands that are believed to have been the territory of the tribes of Ephraim and Manasseh (Menashe) in biblical times. Wadi Qana (Hebrew name: Nahal Kana), is administered by the Israel Nature and Parks Authority and is defined as a nature reserve.

=== Leadership ===
The chief rabbi of Karnei Shomron is Yitzhak HaLevy.

Igal Lahav is the head of the Karnei Shomron Local Council.

=== 2002 mall attack ===
During the Second Intifada, on 16 February 2002, two people were killed and 30 people were wounded, six seriously, when a suicide bomber blew himself up at a pizzeria in Ginot Shomron shopping mall in Karnei Shomron. Rachel Thaler, aged 16, died of her wounds on 27 February. The Popular Front for the Liberation of Palestine (PFLP) claimed responsibility for the attack.

== Voting Patterns ==
In the 2022 election, 85 percent of voters in Karnei Shomron voted for the parties of the right-wing coalition led by Benjamin Netanyahu, while 10 percent voted for the parties of the center-left coalition led by Yair Lapid and 0.02 percent voted for the Arab parties.

In the 2026 election, 83 percent of voters in Karnei Shomron voted for the parties of the right-wing coalition led by Benjamin Netanyahu, while 11 percent voted for the parties of the center-left coalition led by Gadi Eisenkot and 0.02 percent voted for the Arab parties. An additional 2 percent voted for the Reservists, and 3.4 percent voted for Amcha Yisrael. Voter turnout increased 15 percent from the 2022 election.

== Notable residents ==
- Michael Ben-Ari (b. 1963), politician
- Moshe Feiglin (b. 1962), politician
- Shmuel Sackett (b. 1961), activist
