= Immanuel (Israeli settlement) =

Israeli settlement in the West Bank

Immanuel: עִמָּנוּאֵל; عيمانوئيل
- Local council

Hebrew transcription(s)
  - ISO 259: ʕimmanuˀel
  - Translit.: Imanu'el
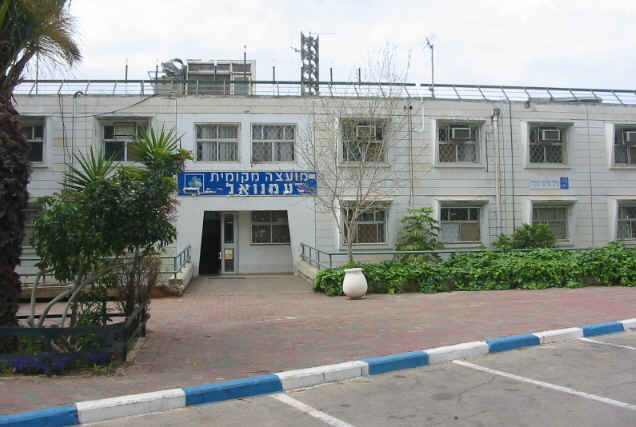
- Headquarters of Immanuel Local Council

- Location within the Northern West Bank
- Coordinates: 32°9′42.71″N 35°8′13.98″E
- Region: West Bank
- District: Judea and Samaria Area

Government
  - Head of Municipality: Ezra Gershi

Area
  - Total: 2,750 dunams (2.75 km^{2}; 1.06 sq mi)

Population (2024)
  - Total: 5,675
  - Density: 2,060/km^{2} (5,340/sq mi)
- Name meaning: God is with us

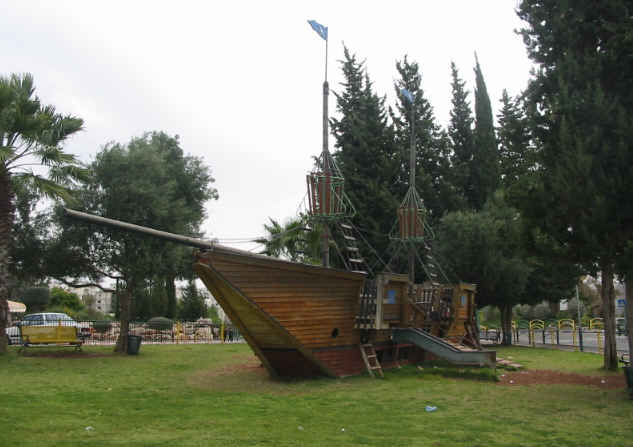
Playground in an Immanuel central roundabout

Immanuel, (Hebrew: עִמָּנוּאֵל, IPA: i.maˌnuˈel) also spelled Emmanuel or Emanuel, is an Israeli settlement organized as a local council located in the West Bank. Immanuel was established in 1983. In 2024 it had a population of 5,675; its jurisdiction is spread out over 2,750 dunams (2.75 km^{2}).

The international community considers Immanuel along with all other Israeli settlements in the West Bank illegal under international law, but the Israeli government disputes this.

== History ==
According to ARIJ, in order to construct Immanuel, Israel confiscated land from two nearby Palestinian villages;

- 951 dunams of land were taken from Deir Istiya,
- and 163 dunams of land were taken from Immatain.

Founded in 1983, the town was named after the symbolic child's name in Isaiah 7:14. Ariel Sharon spoke at its dedication along with a representative of the Gur Hasidim. The building project however was strongly opposed by Lithuanian rabbis in Bnei Brak who believed its establishment was a "provocation to the nations" and Rabbi Elazar Shach issued a ban on buying property there.

The town was declared a local council in 1985 and its first head of council was Oded Alon. Immanuel's current head of council is Yeshayahu Ehrenreich, while its acting mayor is Ezra Gershi.

In the 1990s, Immanuel was undergoing a major expansion, but the Oslo Accords discouraged investors and construction firms from continuing to build. As a result, a major portion of present-day Immanuel consists of unfinished steel structures and concrete. Land value is also extremely low, often four to six times lower than in central Israeli towns and cities.

While Immanuel has a modest light industrial area which provides work for Israelis and Palestinians, there are otherwise not many more local career opportunities that are not related to education or Torah study; therefore many of its residents commute to nearby Ariel, Jerusalem and Bnei Brak for employment. The town is served by a public transportation route run by the Dan Bus Company.

== Voting Patterns ==
In the 2026 election, 98 percent of voters in Immanuel voted for the parties of the right-wing coalition led by Benjamin Netanyahu, while 0.5 percent voted for the parties of the center-left coalition led by Gadi Eisenkot and 0.04 percent voted for the Arab parties. 68 percent of voters voted for the Haredi parties Shas or UTJ. Voter turnout increased 35 percent from the 2022 election.

== Status under international law ==
The international community considers Israeli settlements including Immanuel, to be in violation of the Fourth Geneva Convention's prohibition on the transfer of an occupying power's civilian population into occupied territory. Israel disputes that the Fourth Geneva Convention applies to the West Bank region as it had not been legally held by a sovereign nation prior to Israel taking control of it, and the settlement population was not forcibly transferred but rather moved voluntarily. This view has been rejected by the International Court of Justice and the International Committee of the Red Cross.

== Violence ==
On December 12, 2001, members of the Hamas and Fatah movements detonated two roadside bombs on the commuter Dan bus line 189 as it slowed to a stop 70 meters from the entrance of the settlement. Three terrorists began firing automatic weapons and threw hand-grenades at the bus as 11 people were killed and 26 others suffered injuries.

In 2002, the town was again the site of an ambush attack by Palestinian militants in which 9 people were killed and 20 others injured. Two 20-kilo bombs were set off by Palestinians disguised as IDF officers at the entrance of the settlement, damaging a commuting bus from the city of Bnei Brak. The militants then threw grenades at the bus and opened fire on the passengers and another vehicle behind the bus.

== Controversy ==
=== Beit Yaakov school segregation ===
In 2007, Immanuel became the site of a dispute over the alleged discrimination of students at the state-funded Beit Yaakov girls' school involving segregation between Ashkenazi and Sephardi students. The school had segregated the students based on a ruling by a rabbi named Samuel Berzovski, at the time the spiritual leader of the Haredi community in Immanuel. The Israeli Supreme Court ruled the discrimination illegal in 2009 and ordered the students integrated.

=== Malka Leifer ===
In 2016, Malka Leifer, a former high school principal facing 74 counts of alleged sex abuse of her pupils in Australia, returned to live in Immanuel, but was rearrested in 2018 and extradited to Australia in 2021. In June 2018, Emmanuel was cited as a "haven for paedophiles" by The Sydney Morning Herald, which exposed further alleged child sexual abuse there by Leifer, committed "without consequence." Leifer's husband, Rabbi Yaakov Yosef (Jacob) Leifer, fled to Israel with her and reportedly heads the small Chust (Khust) Hassidic community in Immanuel, where his wife was arrested. The father of Rabbi Leifer and former leader of the Khust Hasidic, Grand Rabbi Baruch Pinchas Leifer, was arrested, in January 2022, and charged with historical sexual abuse of a minor to whom he is related, and a then 18 year-old male; he denies the charges, which are before Jerusalem Magistrate Courts.
