= Khirbet Sir =

- Municipality type C

Arabic transcription(s)
  - Arabic: خربة صير
- Location of Sir within Palestine
- Coordinates: 32°11′49″N 35°03′38″E
- Palestine grid: 155/178
- State: State of Palestine
- Governorate: Qalqilya

Government
  - Type: Municipality

Population (2017)
  - Total: 645
- Name meaning: The ruin of the fold

Khirbet Sir (Arabic: خربة صير) is a Palestinian town in the Qalqilya Governorate in the eastern West Bank, located 8 kilometers east of Qalqilya.

Following its destruction and abandonment due to 16th-century local conflict, Khirbet Sir was likely resettled in the early 20th century by people from Hajjah. In 2017, it was home to 645 residents.

== History ==
Ceramics from the Byzantine era have been found here.

Some village residents have ancient roots in the area. The 14th century Samaritan chronicle, the Tolidah, records that Shirrī son of Ab Baʿe of the Bene Zabad resided in Qiryat ʿUskur near Jinsafut. Shirrī's Muslim descendants later moved to Hajjah and then to its Sir, forming Sir's eponymous Shirrī clan.

=== Ottoman era ===
Sir was incorporated into the Ottoman Empire in 1517 with all of Palestine. In 1596, it appeared in the tax registers as being in the Nahiya of Bani Sa'b, part of Nablus Sanjak. It had a population of 10 households, all Muslim. The villagers paid a fixed tax-rate of 33.3% on agricultural products, including wheat, barley, summer crops, olive trees, occasional revenues, goats and/or beehives, and a customary tax on subjects in Nablus region; a total of 7,000 akçe. Half of the revenue went to a Waqf.

The village was destroyed and abandoned as a result of a local conflict in the 16th century.

In 1882 the PEF's Survey of Western Palestine (SWP) noted at Khurbet Sir: "two rock cut tombs, a large mound with terraces cut in the sides, a good well below; has every appearance of an ancient site."

=== Modern era ===
It is likely that Khirbet Sir was resettled in the early 20th century by individuals from Hajjah. In 1931, it was listed as a khirbet (temporal settlement) of Hajjah.

In the wake of the 1948 Arab–Israeli War, and after the 1949 Armistice Agreements, Sir came under Jordanian rule.

The Jordanian census of 1961 found 235 inhabitants in Kh. Sir.

After the Six-Day War in 1967, Sir has been under Israeli occupation.

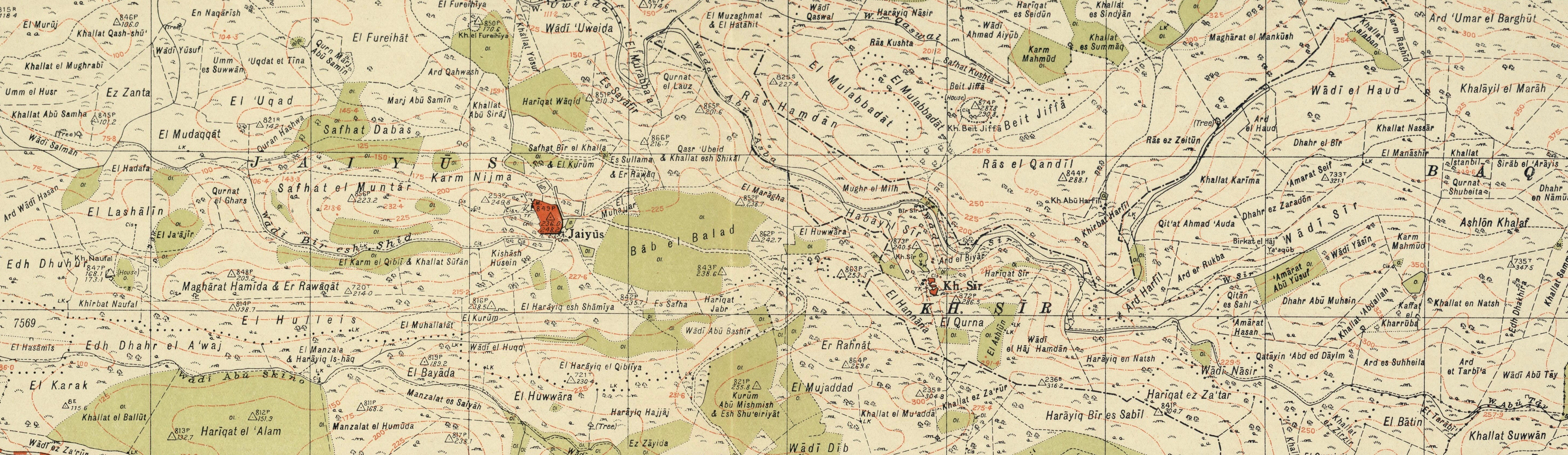
Khirbet Sir 1943 1:20,000

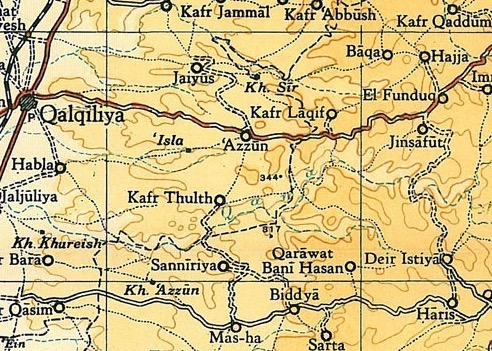
Khirbet Sir 1945 1:250,000

== Bibliography ==
- Conder, C.R.; Kitchener, H.H. (1882). The Survey of Western Palestine: Memoirs of the Topography, Orography, Hydrography, and Archaeology. Vol. 2. London: Committee of the Palestine Exploration Fund.
- Dauphin, C. (1998). La Palestine byzantine, Peuplement et Populations. BAR International Series 726 (in French). Vol. III : Catalogue. Oxford: Archeopress. ISBN 0-860549-05-4.
- Government of Jordan, Department of Statistics (1964). First Census of Population and Housing. Volume I: Final Tables; General Characteristics of the Population (PDF).
- Hütteroth, W.-D.; Abdulfattah, K. (1977). Historical Geography of Palestine, Transjordan and Southern Syria in the Late 16th Century. Erlanger Geographische Arbeiten, Sonderband 5. Erlangen, Germany: Vorstand der Fränkischen Geographischen Gesellschaft. ISBN 3-920405-41-2.
- Palmer, E.H. (1881). The Survey of Western Palestine: Arabic and English Name Lists Collected During the Survey by Lieutenants Conder and Kitchener, R. E. Transliterated and Explained by E.H. Palmer. Committee of the Palestine Exploration Fund.
