= Jinsafut =

- Municipality type D (Village council)

Arabic transcription(s)
  - Arabic: جينصافوط
  - Latin: Jensafut (official)
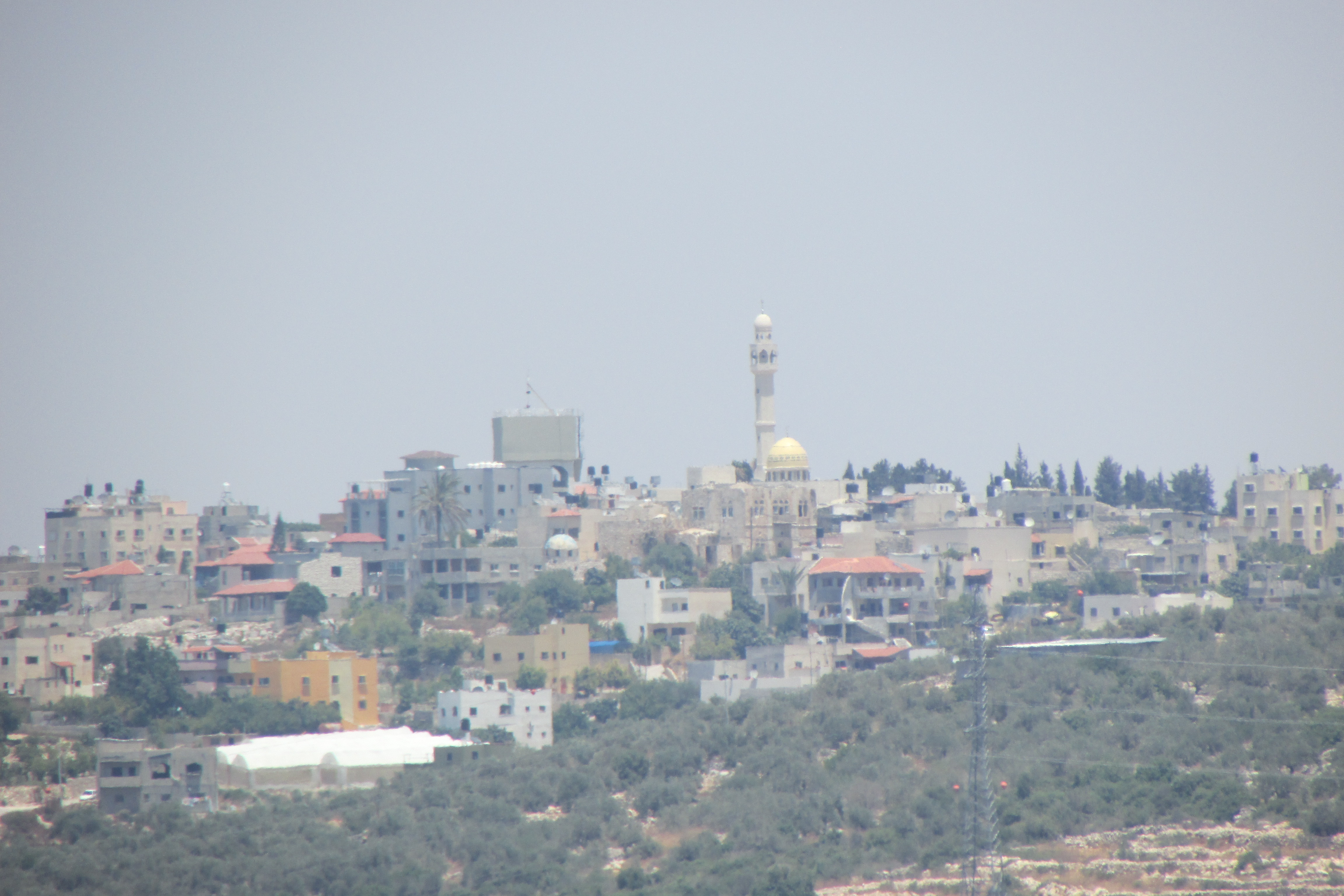
- Jinsafut, 2015

- Location of Jinsafut within Palestine
- Coordinates: 32°10′43″N 35°07′46″E
- Palestine grid: 162/176
- State: State of Palestine
- Governorate: Qalqilya

Government
  - Type: Village council

Area
  - Total: 9.3 km^{2} (3.6 sq mi)
- Elevation: 404–462 m (1,325–1,516 ft)

Population (2017)
  - Total: 2,571
  - Density: 280/km^{2} (720/sq mi)
- Name meaning: Jinsafut

Jinsafut (Arabic: جينصافوط, Jinṣāfūṭ) is a Palestinian village in the Qalqilya Governorate of the State of Palestine, in the northeastern West Bank, located east of Qalqilya. According to the Palestinian Central Bureau of Statistics, the village had a population of 2,571 inhabitants in 2017.

Fatah's Secretary-General Farouk Kaddoumi was born in Jinsafut.

In 2012 it was decided that Jinsafut and Al-Funduq should be merged under one local council.

== Etymology ==
The name Jinsafut had varied spellings historically, reflecting different interpretations and transcriptions by records and researchers. The unique name of the village, absent from Arabic texts, suggests it retains an ancient title, as is common with numerous locations across the region of Palestine.

According to one theory, Jinsafut may preserve the name of Qiryat ha-Mishpaṭ, mentioned in the 14th-century Samaritan Tolidah. Sharon implies that Jinsafut could have evolved from the Hebrew word "ha-Mishpaṭ" (המשפט), with "Qiryat" possibly being a Samaritan addition.

The chronicle mentions the town being located across from a village known as ʿUskur, and indeed, to the east of Jinsafut. The Tolidah records two Samaritan residents of Qiryat ʿUskur: Shirri son Ab Baʿe of the Bene Zabad lineage and Yusif b. Sukuh b. Maḥpaṣya of the Bene Magid clan. The Muslim descendants of the Shirrī clan moved from ʿUskūr to Qaryat Hajjah and, thence, to its satellite village of Sir.

== Location ==
Jinsafut (including Al-Funduq) is located 16 kilometers (9.9 mi) east of Qalqiliya. It is bordered by Immatin to the east, Deir Istiya to the south, Wadi Qana (in Salfit Governorate) to the west and Hajja to the north.

== History ==
The Samaritan Tolidah records Jinsafut as the Town of Judgement (Qiryat ha-Mishpat) built by 4th century Samaritan leader Baba Rabba.

=== Early Islamic period ===
According to the Continuatio of the Samaritan Chronicle of Abu'l-Fath, During the reign of Abbasid Caliph al-Radi (935–940), Arabs from Jinsafut gathered and burned five Samaritans, all renowned in their villages, to death.

=== Mamluk period ===
A construction text, over the lintel to a shrine known both as 'az-Zawiyah' and 'al Khilwah', informs us that it was built by Mubarak ibn Salih Alusi in the Mamluk era, in the year 791 AH (1389 CE).

=== Ottoman period ===
The place appeared in 1596 Ottoman tax registers as 'Jim Safut', being in the nahiya (subdistrict) of Bani Sa'b of the liwa (district) of Nablus. It had a population of 26 households, all Muslim. They paid a fixed tax-rate of 33.3% on agricultural products, including wheat barley, summer crops, olives, goats and beehives, and a press for olives or grapes; a total of 8,654 akçe.

In 1838, Robinson noted 'Jin Safut' as a village in Bani Sa'b. In 1870 Victor Guérin described viewing the village from Fara'ata, but did not visit it. In 1870/1871, an Ottoman census listed the village in the nahiya (subdistrict) of Bani Sa'b. In 1882, the Palestine Exploration Fund's Survey of Western Palestine described the village as "a small village on high ground, with wells to the north, and a few olives."

=== British Mandate era ===
In the 1922 census of Palestine conducted by the British Mandate authorities, Jinsafut had a population of 267 inhabitants, all Muslims, increasing in the 1931 census to 315 Muslims, with 76 houses. In the 1945 census the population was 450 Muslims, with 9,356 dunams of land, according to an official land and population survey. Of this, 1,410 dunams were for plantations or irrigated land, 2,208 for cereals, while 14 dunams were built-up (urban) land.

=== Jordanian era ===
In the wake of the 1948 Arab–Israeli War, and after the 1949 Armistice Agreements, Jinsafut came under Jordanian rule. It was annexed by Jordan in 1950. The Jordanian census of 1961 found 729 inhabitants in Jinsafut.

=== 1967-present ===
Since the Six-Day War in 1967, Jinsafut has been under Israeli occupation. After the 1995 accords, 4.8% of Jinsafut and Al-Funduq land was classified as Area B, the remaining 95.2% is Area C. Israel has expropriated 713 dunums of land from Jinsafut in order to establish two Israeli settlements; Karne Shomron and Neve Oramin.

== Places of Interest ==
Jinsafut houses two sanctuaries dedicated to local holy men: Shaykh Aḥmad in the north and Shaykh Abū Saʿīd in the south.

Centrally located in the village is a khilwah (according to Husseni) or zāwiyah (according to Mayer), both terms denoting a small sanctuary dedicated to private meditation. At its entrance there is a marble slab dating back to 1389, bearing an inscription commemorating its construction by Mubārak Ibn Ṣāliḥ Alūsī. This inscription, accompanied by a heraldic shield, signifies Mubārak's status as a free and esteemed Muslim official, likely serving as a cup-bearer to the sultan, maybe the Mamluk sultan Barquq.

== Demographics ==
The village's residents have their origins in Kafr Qallil and Kafr Qaddum. Some families of Jinsafut include al-Ayoub, al-Sukar, al-Saber, al-Allan, al-Nassar, al-Bashir and Eid.

Prior to 1967, Jinsafut had a population of 700, which decreased to 550 after the 1967 Six-Day War; the drop was caused by residents fleeing the village to Jordan. According to a PCBS estimate, the village had grown to 2,122 inhabitants in 2003, then rose to 2,280 in 2006.

== Economy ==
Before 1967, 99.5% of Jinsafut's labor force depended agriculture, particularly on peach and grape crops, as well as raising livestock. The remainder worked in civil jobs. From 1967 to 2002, 91% of the village residents depended on agriculture or working in Israel, 6% were employed in the Palestinian National Authority government and 3% worked in commerce. Since the beginning of the Second Intifada, vehicle movement in Jinsafut has been constricted by Israel, contributing to 93% of the working population being unemployed.

According to the Applied Research Institute - Jerusalem, Jinsafut has a land area of 9,335 dunams; 31.8% is used for growing crops, 4.3% are for heterogeneous agricultural areas, 1.9% for herbaceous vegetation associations, 5.2% is designated as arable land, 3% is built-up area, 8% is used for land for Israeli settlements and the remainder is forest area.

== Bibliography ==
- Barron, J.B., ed. (1923). Palestine: Report and General Abstracts of the Census of 1922. Government of Palestine.
- Conder, C.R.; Kitchener, H.H. (1882). The Survey of Western Palestine: Memoirs of the Topography, Orography, Hydrography, and Archaeology. Vol. 2. London: Committee of the Palestine Exploration Fund.
- Government of Jordan, Department of Statistics (1964). First Census of Population and Housing. Volume I: Final Tables; General Characteristics of the Population (PDF).
- Government of Palestine, Department of Statistics (1945). Village Statistics, April, 1945.
- Guérin, V. (1875). Description Géographique Historique et Archéologique de la Palestine (in French). Vol. 2: Samarie, pt. 2. Paris: L'Imprimerie Nationale.
- Hadawi, S. (1970). Village Statistics of 1945: A Classification of Land and Area ownership in Palestine. Palestine Liberation Organization Research Center.
- Hütteroth, W.-D.; Abdulfattah, K. (1977). Historical Geography of Palestine, Transjordan and Southern Syria in the Late 16th Century. Erlanger Geographische Arbeiten, Sonderband 5. Erlangen, Germany: Vorstand der Fränkischen Geographischen Gesellschaft. ISBN 3-920405-41-2.
- Mayer, L.A. (1933). Saracenic Heraldry: A Survey. Oxford: Oxford University Press.
- Mills, E., ed. (1932). Census of Palestine 1931. Population of Villages, Towns and Administrative Areas. Jerusalem: Government of Palestine.
- Palmer, E.H. (1881). The Survey of Western Palestine: Arabic and English Name Lists Collected During the Survey by Lieutenants Conder and Kitchener, R. E. Transliterated and Explained by E.H. Palmer. Committee of the Palestine Exploration Fund.
- Robinson, E.; Smith, E. (1841). Biblical Researches in Palestine, Mount Sinai and Arabia Petraea: A Journal of Travels in the year 1838. Vol. 3. Boston: Crocker & Brewster.
- Sharon, M. (2016). Corpus Inscriptionum Arabicarum Palaestinae, J (I). Vol. 6. BRILL. ISBN 978-90-04-32479-4.
