= Al-Funduq =

- Municipality type D (Village council)

Arabic transcription(s)
  - Arabic: الفندق
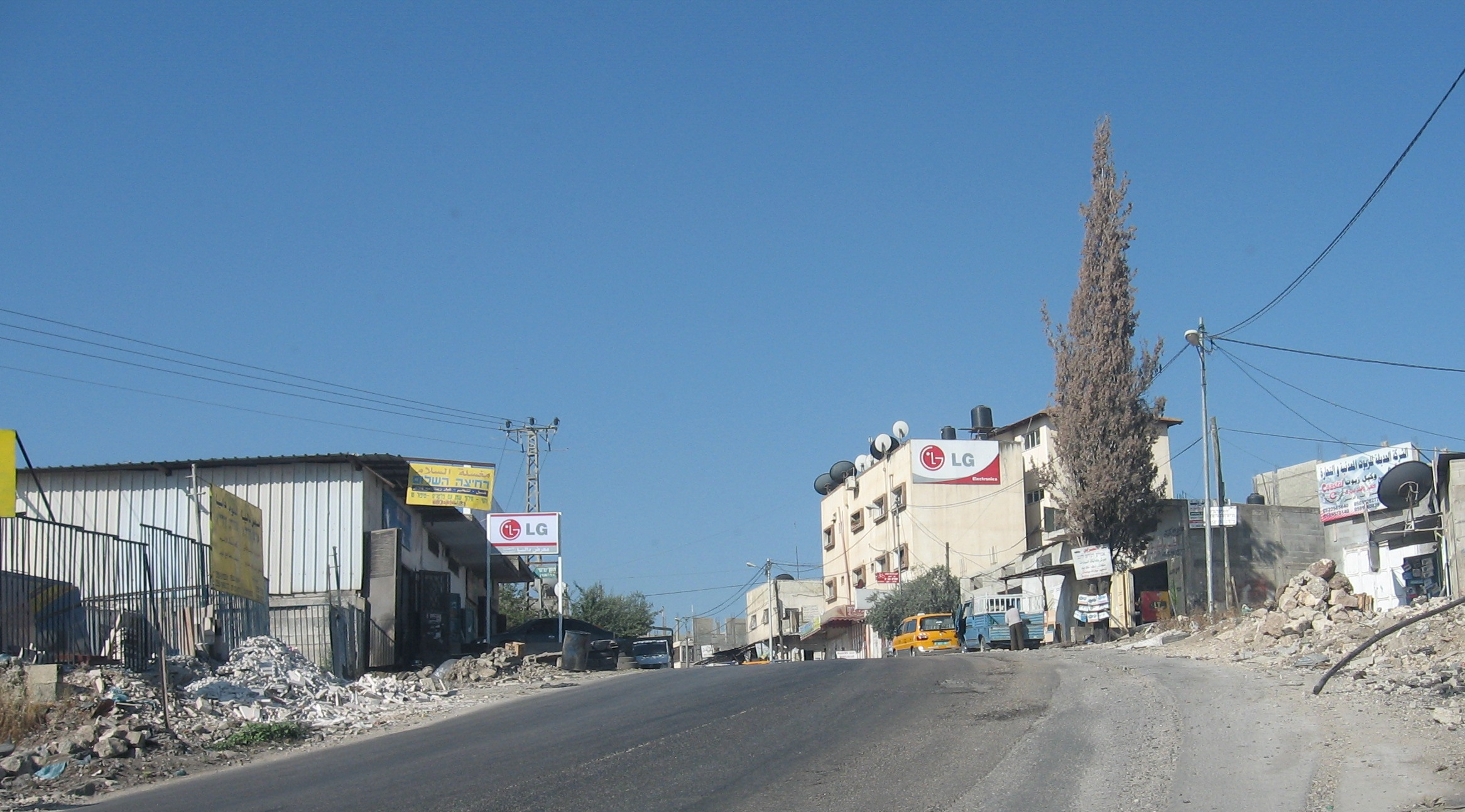
- Al-Funduq

- Location of Al-Funduq within Palestine
- Coordinates: 32°11′27″N 35°08′13″E
- Palestine grid: 163/177
- State: State of Palestine
- Governorate: Qalqilya

Government
  - Type: Village council

Area
  - Total: 9.3 km^{2} (3.6 sq mi)
- Elevation: 404–462 m (1,325–1,516 ft)

Population (2017)
  - Total: 1,125
  - Density: 120/km^{2} (310/sq mi)
- Name meaning: El Funduk, "the inn"

Al-Funduq (Arabic: الفندق) is a Palestinian village in the Qalqilya Governorate of the State of Palestine, in the northeastern West Bank, located east of Qalqilya. According to the Palestinian Central Bureau of Statistics, the village had a population of 1,125 in 2017. The village took its name from an Arabic word for "inn."

In 2012, Jinsafut and Al-Funduq merged under one local council.

== Location ==
Al-Funduq is located 16 kilometers (9.9 mi) east of Qalqiliya. It is bordered by Immatain to the east, Deir Istiya to the south, Wadi Qana (in Salfit Governorate) to the west and Hajja to the north.

== History ==
=== Byzantine period ===
Ceramics from the Byzantine era were found here, and it has been suggested that this place was Fondeka, once inhabited by Samaritans.

=== Crusader period ===
During the Crusader period Funduq was inhabited by Muslims, according to the historian Diya al-Din al-Maqdisi. A Hanbali scholar named Ahmad ibn Abd al-Daim al-Maqaddasi al-Hanbali was born in the village in 575 AH/1180 CE. He died there in 668 AH/March 1270 CE. Followers of the Hanbali scholar Ibn Qudamah (1146/47-1223) also lived in the village. A Muslim sheikh named Abd Allah was another resident.

=== Ottoman period ===
The place appeared in 1596 Ottoman tax registers as Funduq. It was in the Nahiya of Bani Sa'b of the Liwa of Nablus and had a population of 86 households, all Muslim, who paid a fixed tax-rate of 33.3% on wheat, barley, summer crops, olives, goats, beehives, and a press for olives or grapes, in addition to occasional revenue - a total of 10,500 akçe.

A map from Napoleon's invasion of 1799 by Pierre Jacotin calls it Fondouk, a village by the road from Jaffa to Nablus.

In 1838 Robinson described el-Funduk as a village in Beni Sa'ab district, west of Nablus.

In 1870/1871 (1288 AH), an Ottoman census listed the village in the nahiya (sub-district) of Bani Sa'b.

In 1882, the PEF's Survey of Western Palestine described the village as "a small poor village by the main road, with wells to the north and two sacred places; it stands on high ground," and located in the Beni Sab district.

=== British Mandate ===
In the 1922 census of Palestine conducted by the British Mandate authorities, Funduq had a population of 66 inhabitants, all Muslims, increasing in the 1931 census to 72 Muslims, with 21 houses.

In the 1945 census El Funduq had a population was 100 Muslims, with 1,619 dunams of land, according to an official land and population survey. Of this, 43 dunams were for plantations or irrigated land, 1,026 for cereals, while 14 dunams were built-up (urban) land.

=== Jordanian period ===
In the wake of the 1948 Arab–Israeli War, and after the 1949 Armistice Agreements, Al-Funduq came under Jordanian rule.

The Jordanian census of 1961 found 137 inhabitants in Al-Funduq.

=== Post-1967 ===
Since the Six-Day War in 1967, Al-Funduq has been under Israeli occupation.

After the 1995 accords, 4.8% of Jinsafut and Al-Funduq land was classified as Area B, the remaining 95.2% as Area C.

== Demography ==
=== Local origins ===
Al-Funduq's residents originally came from Jab'it, near Duma. The village also absorbed refugees from Kafr Qara.

== Bibliography ==
- Avi-Yonah, M. (1976). Gazetteer of Roman Palestine. QEDEM 5. Institute of Archaeology, Hebrew University of Jerusalem, and CARTA. p. 89. (Avi Yonah, 1976, p. 89)
- Barron, J.B., ed. (1923). Palestine: Report and General Abstracts of the Census of 1922. Government of Palestine.
- Conder, C.R.; Kitchener, H.H. (1882). The Survey of Western Palestine: Memoirs of the Topography, Orography, Hydrography, and Archaeology. Vol. 2. London: Committee of the Palestine Exploration Fund.
- Dauphin, C. (1998). La Palestine byzantine, Peuplement et Populations. BAR International Series 726 (in French). Vol. III : Catalogue. Oxford: Archeopress. ISBN 0-860549-05-4.
- Dorsey, David A. (1987). "Shechem and the Road Network of Central Samaria". Bulletin of the American Schools of Oriental Research (268): 57–70. doi:10.2307/1356994. JSTOR 1356994. S2CID 163292710. ("a ruin with Iron II pottery"; citing a 1972 Hebrew source.)
- Drory, Joseph (1988). "Hanbalis of the Nablus Region in the Eleventh and Twelfth Centuries". Asian and African Studies. 22: 93–112.
- Ellenblum, R. (2003). Frankish Rural Settlement in the Latin Kingdom of Jerusalem. Cambridge University Press. ISBN 9780521521871.
- Government of Jordan, Department of Statistics (1964). First Census of Population and Housing. Volume I: Final Tables; General Characteristics of the Population (PDF).
- Government of Palestine, Department of Statistics (1945). Village Statistics, April, 1945.
- Guérin, V. (1875). Description Géographique Historique et Archéologique de la Palestine (in French). Vol. 2: Samarie, pt. 2. Paris: L'Imprimerie Nationale.
- Hadawi, S. (1970). Village Statistics of 1945: A Classification of Land and Area ownership in Palestine. Palestine Liberation Organization Research Center. Archived from the original on 2018-12-08.
- Hütteroth, W.-D.; Abdulfattah, K. (1977). Historical Geography of Palestine, Transjordan and Southern Syria in the Late 16th Century. Erlanger Geographische Arbeiten, Sonderband 5. Erlangen, Germany: Vorstand der Fränkischen Geographischen Gesellschaft. ISBN 3-920405-41-2.
- Karmon, Y. (1960). "An Analysis of Jacotin's Map of Palestine" (PDF). Israel Exploration Journal. 10 (3, 4): 155–173, 244–253. Archived from the original (PDF) on 2019-12-22.
- Kedar, B. Franks, Muslims and Oriental Christians in the Latin Levant. (several mentions)
- Mills, E., ed. (1932). Census of Palestine 1931. Population of Villages, Towns and Administrative Areas. Jerusalem: Government of Palestine.
- Neubauer, A. (1868). La géographie du Talmud : mémoire couronné par l'Académie des inscriptions et belles-lettres (in French). Paris: Lévy.
- Palmer, E.H. (1881). The Survey of Western Palestine: Arabic and English Name Lists Collected During the Survey by Lieutenants Conder and Kitchener, R. E. Transliterated and Explained by E.H. Palmer. Committee of the Palestine Exploration Fund.
- Robinson, E.; Smith, E. (1841). Biblical Researches in Palestine, Mount Sinai and Arabia Petraea: A Journal of Travels in the year 1838. Vol. 3. Boston: Crocker & Brewster.
- Talmon-Heller, Daniella (1994). "Popular Hanbalite Islam in 12th-13th Century Jabal Nablus and Jabal Qasyūn". Studia Islamica. 79: 103–120. doi:10.2307/1595838. JSTOR 1595838.
- Talmon-Heller, Daniella (2002). Riley-Smith, J. (ed.). The Cited Tales of the Wondrous Doings of the Shaykhs of the Holy Land. Vol. 1. published in Crusades. Aldershot, Hampshire: Published by Ashgate for the Society for the Study of the Crusades and the Latin East. pp. 111–154. ISBN 0754609189.
