= Fara'ata =

Far'ata
- Local Development Committee

Arabic transcription(s)
  - Arabic: فرعتا
  - Latin: Far'ata (unofficial)
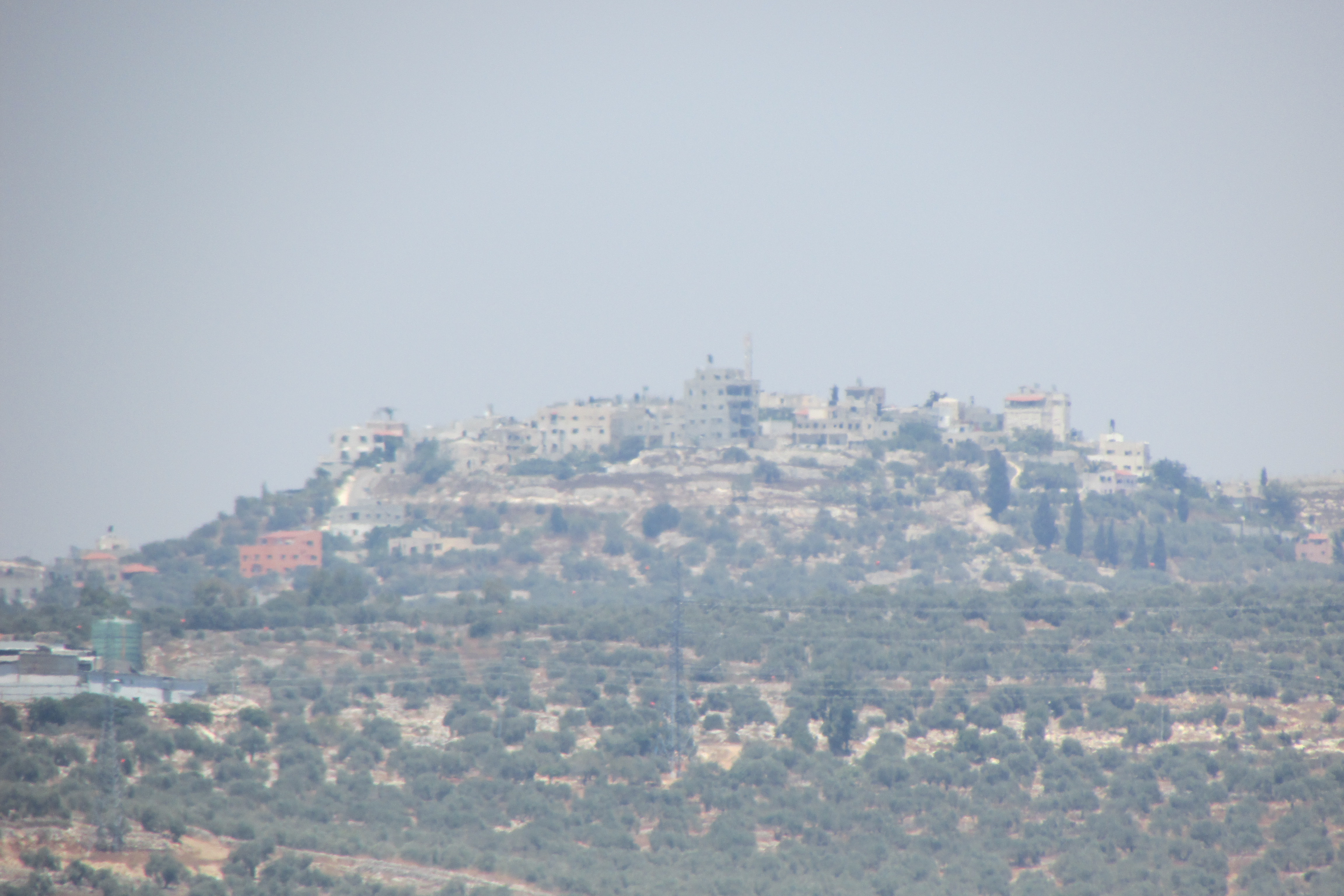
- Far'ata

- Location of Fara'ata within Palestine
- Coordinates: 32°11′26″N 35°09′57″E
- Palestine grid: 165/177
- State: State of Palestine
- Governorate: Qalqilya

Government
  - Type: Local Development Committee
- Elevation: 432–518 m (1,417–1,699 ft)

Population (2017)
  - Total: 872
- Name meaning: Ferata, p.n.

Far'ata (Arabic: فرعتا) was a Palestinian village in the Qalqilya Governorate in the Western area of the West Bank, located 16 kilometers southwest of Nablus. According to the Palestinian Central Bureau of Statistics, the village had a population of 872 inhabitants in 2017.

In 2012 Fara'ata was merged with the larger Immatain village council.

== Location ==
Immatin and Far’ata are located 19 kilometers (12 mi) west of Qalqiliya. They are bordered by Tell to the east, Deir Istiya to the south, Jinsafut, Al Funduq and Hajjah to the west, and Kafr Qaddum and Jit to the north.

== History ==
Byzantine ceramics have been found in the village.

Fara'ata was noted in the Samaritan Chronicle (from the 12th century) under the name of Ophrah, while it has been known under its present name since the 14th century.

=== Ottoman era ===
Far'ata was incorporated into the Ottoman Empire in 1517 with all of Palestine, and in 1596 it appeared in the tax registers as Fara'ta, being in the Nahiya of Jabal Qubal of the Liwa of Nablus. It had a population of 12 households and 6 bachelor, all Muslim. The villagers paid a fixed tax rate of 33,3% on a number of crops, including wheat, barley, summer crops, olive trees, goats and beehives, in addition to occasional revenues, a press for olive oil or grape syrup, and a fixed tax for people of Nablus area; a total of 4,500 Akçe.

In 1838, Fer'ata was noted as located in Jurat Merda, south of Nablus.

In 1870 the French explorer Victor Guérin visited Far'ata, which he described having "a very small number" of people, with some cisterns and remains of a stone sarcophagus as remnants of former history.

In 1870/1871 (1288 AH), an Ottoman census listed the village with a population of 10 households in the nahiya (sub-district) of Jamma'in al-Awwal, subordinate to Nablus.

In the PEF's Survey of Western Palestine (SWP) (1882), Far'ata was described as a "small village of ancient appearance, standing on a [..] mound, with a rock-cut tomb to the south, and a sacred Mukam to the east."

=== British Mandate era ===
In the 1922 census of Palestine conducted by the British Mandate authorities, Far'ata had a population of 36, all Muslim, increasing in the 1931 census to of 47 Muslims, in a total of 11 houses.

In the 1945 statistics the population of Far'ata was 70 Muslims, while the total land area was 1,664 dunams, according to an official land and population survey. Of this, 56 were allocated for plantations and irrigable land, 961 for cereals, while 10 dunams were classified as built-up areas.

=== Jordanian era ===
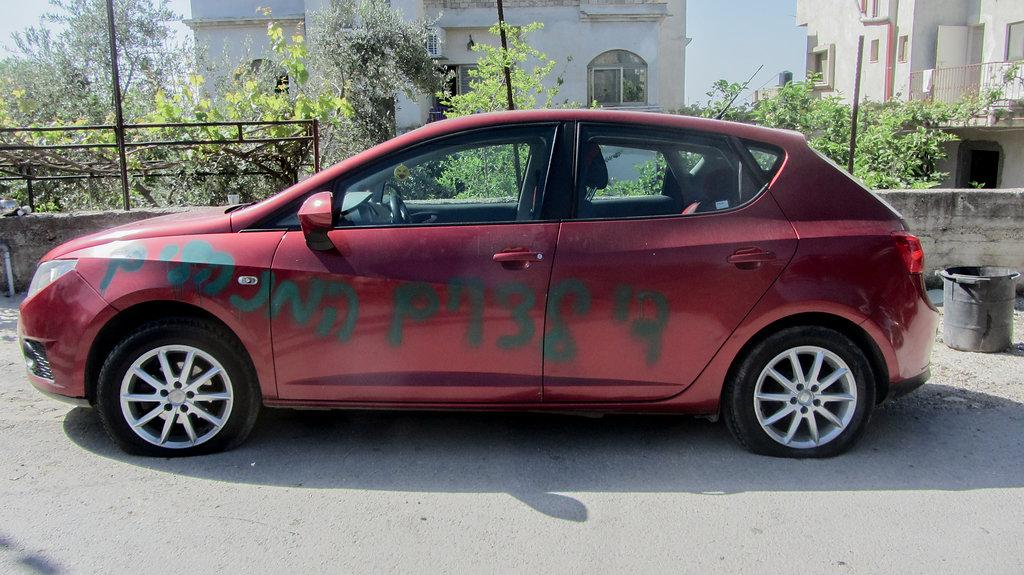
"No more administrative orders." Graffiti spray-painted in Hebrew by Israeli settlers on a car in Fara'ata, 2018

In the wake of the 1948 Arab–Israeli War, and after the 1949 Armistice Agreements, Far'ata came under Jordanian rule.

The Jordanian census of 1961 found 317 inhabitants in Faraata.

=== Post-1967 ===
Since the Six-Day War in 1967, Far'ata has been held under Israeli occupation.

After the 1995 accords, 58.3% of the total village land of Immatain/Far'ata was assigned as Area B land, while the remaining 41.7% is Area C land.

In 2010, Far'ata was described by Gideon Levy as one of the Palestinian villages where the people "live in terror of the settlers and their accursed 'Price tag,' and nobody came to their defense".

== Demography ==
=== Local origins ===
Fara'ata's residents originally came from Immatain.

== Bibliography ==
- Barron, J.B., ed. (1923). Palestine: Report and General Abstracts of the Census of 1922. Government of Palestine.
- Conder, C.R.; Kitchener, H.H. (1882). The Survey of Western Palestine: Memoirs of the Topography, Orography, Hydrography, and Archaeology. Vol. 2. London: Committee of the Palestine Exploration Fund.
- Dauphin, C. (1998). La Palestine byzantine, Peuplement et Populations. BAR International Series 726 (in French). Vol. III : Catalogue. Oxford: Archeopress. ISBN 0-860549-05-4.
- Government of Jordan, Department of Statistics (1964). First Census of Population and Housing. Volume I: Final Tables; General Characteristics of the Population (PDF).
- Government of Palestine, Department of Statistics (1945). Village Statistics, April, 1945.
- Guérin, V. (1875). Description Géographique Historique et Archéologique de la Palestine (in French). Vol. 2: Samarie, pt. 2. Paris: L'Imprimerie Nationale.
- Hadawi, S. (1970). Village Statistics of 1945: A Classification of Land and Area ownership in Palestine. Palestine Liberation Organization Research Center.
- Hütteroth, W.-D.; Abdulfattah, K. (1977). Historical Geography of Palestine, Transjordan and Southern Syria in the Late 16th Century. Erlanger Geographische Arbeiten, Sonderband 5. Erlangen, Germany: Vorstand der Fränkischen Geographischen Gesellschaft. ISBN 3-920405-41-2.
- Mills, E., ed. (1932). Census of Palestine 1931. Population of Villages, Towns and Administrative Areas. Jerusalem: Government of Palestine.
- Palmer, E.H. (1881). The Survey of Western Palestine: Arabic and English Name Lists Collected During the Survey by Lieutenants Conder and Kitchener, R. E. Transliterated and Explained by E.H. Palmer. Committee of the Palestine Exploration Fund.
- Robinson, E.; Smith, E. (1841). Biblical Researches in Palestine, Mount Sinai and Arabia Petraea: A Journal of Travels in the year 1838. Vol. 3. Boston: Crocker & Brewster.
