= Baba Rabba =

4th-century Samaritan high priest

Baba II Rabba
- Born: 288 CE(?); Kiryat Hagga, Roman Empire
- Died: Constantinople(?)
- Occupation: Samaritan High Priest

Baba II Rabba (Samaritan Aramaic: ࠁࠢࠁࠢࠀ ࠓࠠࠁࠠࠄ, romanized: Bābā Råbbå, Samaritan Hebrew: ࠁࠢࠁࠢࠀ ࠄࠣࠂࠟࠃࠅࠫࠋ, romanized: Bābā ʾagā̊dōl lit. 'Baba the Great'), was a notable Samaritan High Priest. He is believed to have lived during the late third and early fourth centuries; Jeffrey Cohen puts his birth at 288 and his death at 328.

The son of High Priest Nethanel III, Baba Rabba was probably born in Kiryat Hagga, now Hajjah, Palestine in the West Bank. Little is known about his life. According to later Samaritan works, he was a religious reformer, and with the scholar Marqah, he helped codify Samaritan liturgy and worship. He appears to have connections with the Roman authorities. He may have exercised some temporal jurisdiction over the Samaritan community, which seems relatively autonomous during this period. One chronicle places his death at 362 in Constantinople. Baba is also remembered for his actions against Byzantine sanctions on the Samaritan community, such as resisting the ban on circumcision imposed on the Samaritans, reopening and building brand new synagogues throughout Samaria, and administering the country amid its rebellion against the Romans. Per Samaritan chronology, he lived in the "eighth period".

== The Samaritan Rebellion ==
In the early common era, Byzantine rule in Palestine experienced periods of religious fanaticism. Both Jews and Samaritans faced severe persecution. The Jews had revolted against Rome multiple times in the first and second centuries CE, but the especially crushing defeat of the Bar Kokhba revolt in 135 CE proved to be the final stand for Jewish independence, and worsened the already growing Jewish diaspora which would last an additional 2000 years. In comparison, subsequent revolts were minimal, such as the Jewish revolt against Constantius Gallus in 351, which, while thousands-strong, lasted only a year before being decisively crushed by the Romans.

Samaritans were generally ambivalent to Jews, and historically their relationship with their sister Israelites was rough, and occasionally hostile. Uneager to join the various revolts, they were therefore spared of the Romans' wrath, and following the successive defeats of the Jewish rebellions and the progressive extinction of Jews in Palestine, a vacuum opened in the land that the Samaritans, as well as Ghassanid Arabs, were happy to fill. This began a golden age for the Samaritans, who enjoyed limited autonomy from the Roman government.

In the fourth century CE, Baba Rabba, as the son of the high priest, succeeded his father upon the latter's death and became the de facto leader of the Samaritan community. He divided Samarian lands into districts, which he then awarded to aristocratic families, executed several reforms, installed state institutions, and codified much of the liturgy Samaritans continue to use today. He also organized the first Samaritan revolt, which began with the expulsion of the tax collectors.

Micha Yosef Berdychevsky tells the story of the beginning of the rebellion that ended successfully:

And Nathaniel shall have three sons, the name of the firstborn is Baba, and he is Baba Rabba, the second name is Akbon, and the third name is Phinehas. And it came to pass, when they saw the affliction of their tribes, and the plagues that were smitten from within and without, that the spirit of the LORD was upon them, and they envied his jealousy.

Then they came down to the people and cried out: Who is God, to us! And all the holes of the people and their nobles shall be gathered unto them, and seven men shall choose from them. Soldiers and intellectuals, and he appointed them ministers over all the people, and ordered them to command all the tribes and all the families, to teach them the law of the Lord and to keep his commandments and to be their shield before his enemies. And strengthen their hearts, and embrace and strengthen them, that they may not hear the words of the decrees, and their hearts should not fade. And the people shall rejoice in hearing all these things, and shall say, All that thou hast spoken thou and thy brother unto us is done. All the statues of the Gentiles rose up and burned all their nerves; Return to God with all your heart and sing and we will sing to God with songs and thanksgiving.

And it came to pass, when they had made an end of speaking in the house of Egypt, that the children of Ephraim revolted against the king and his officials, and that they began to serve their gods openly and without mercy; And Baba and his brethren stood up with all the seven ministers and commissioners with their men and their heroes and stood against them and made them a great slain and the rest fled to their souls, and let there be peace in Samaria and her daughters!

Unfortunately, the reality of the rebellion was nowhere near as successful. Byzantine forces quickly overran Samaria and ended its semi-independence from the empire.

According to the Kitab al-Tarikh of Abu'l-Fath, an attempt was made on Baba Rabba's life in the synagogue of Namara, where Jews were said to have plotted against him on behalf of the Roman authorities. The account relates that a Jewish woman, who was a friend of a Samaritan woman, warned Baba Rabba of the plan. He is said to have entered the synagogue as usual but departed after dusk in different clothes, which, according to the chronicle, ensured his safety.

Baba Rabba died, according to one chronicle, after being invited to Constantinople, where he was subsequently imprisoned, and later buried. If his death being in Constantinople is accurate, it is more likely Baba was captured and taken to Byzantium, not invited there.

After his death there were further revolts of the Samaritans: the first in 484; the second in 529, when the Samaritans sustained many casualties and some fled to places outside the Land of Israel; and the third in 566.

In light of these uprisings, the Samaritans and their religion were placed under a harsh scrutiny which they had long eluded, in essence becoming "outlawed." The demographic majority held by the Samaritans in Samaria and its margins subsequently disappeared. It is estimated that more than a million Samaritans were exterminated.

== Organization of the Community ==
In Samaritan chronicles, extensive space is devoted to the recording of events in the order in which they occurred and the activities of Baba Rabba. His various works have no external documentation, neither in the Sages' sources nor in the Christian literature of the Byzantine period.

The earliest Samaritan chronicle, the 12th-century Tolidah, reports that Babba Rabba built a synagogue. Abu'l-Fath, a Samaritan chronicler writing in the 14th century but drawing on earlier sources, expands this account. He records that Baba Rabba first reopened synagogues which had been closed, assembled the people there, and read aloud the Torah in their presence. He is also said to have erected a new house of prayer "opposite the Holy Mountain," constructed according to the model of a prayer house in Basra and deliberately given an earthen floor. Finally, Abu’l-Fath enumerates eight synagogues which Baba Rabba was said to have built “with no timber in any of them” in Awarta, Salem, Namara, Qaryat Haja, Qarawa, Tira Luza, Dabarin, and Beit Jan. It is uncertain, however, whether this list preserves authentic traditions from the 3rd–4th century.

Apart from the construction of synagogues and the division of the land into districts, Baba Rabba appointed judges from various localities. He also founded a council composed of priests and sages who were supposed to teach Torah and run new synagogues. The council was composed of seven priests: three priests and four elders.

== National or Local Leader ==
Yitzhak Khamitovsky believes that Baba Rabba was the leader of the rural environment of Nablus. The priesthood in Nablus itself was not a partner in the reforms he made. In the lists of synagogues and judges, there is no mention of the city of Nablus. What's more, at that time the Roman-pagan Nablus - Neapolis - was at its height of prosperity. His actions remained within the area of the surrounding countryside.

According to Yitzhak Magen the tradition surrounding Baba Rabba should be seen as an allusion to the "religious renaissance" of the Samaritan community in the 4th century. The appearance of Baba Rabba, together with the discovery of Greek inscriptions from that period and archeological discoveries of the synagogues of the Samaritans in and outside Samaria indicate a Samaritan religious awakening. In the 4th century, the sacred compound on Mount Gerizim was also rebuilt and the pilgrimage to it reinstated.

== See also ==
- Samaritanism

Preceded by Netaniel III	Samaritan High Priest	Succeeded by Akabon III
