= Al-Shaykh Muwannis =

Village in Jaffa subdistrict, Mandatory Palestine

Al-Shaykh Muwannis الشيخ مونّس Sheikh Muwannis
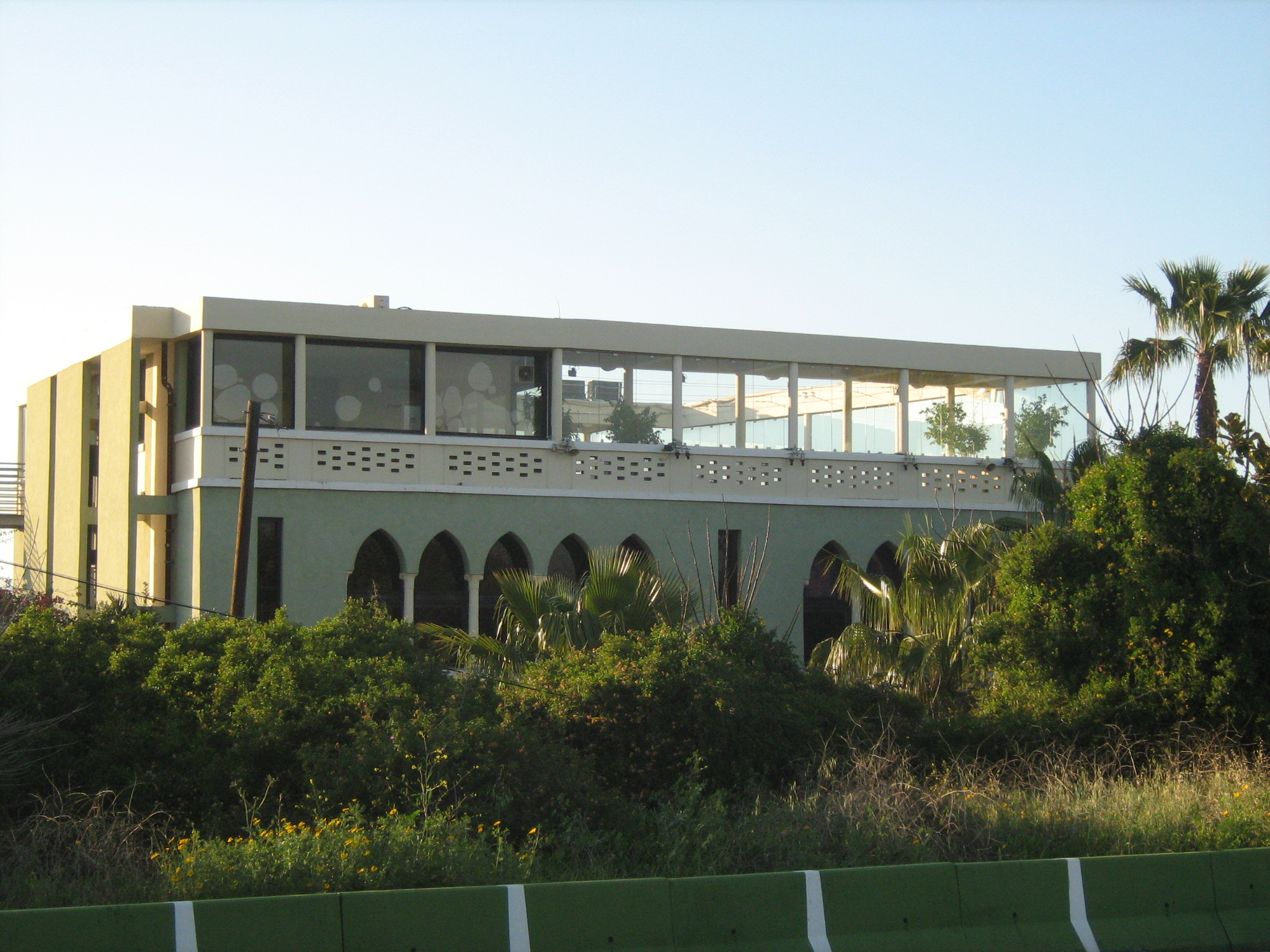
- The former home of the village sheikh, aka "The Green house", presently part of Tel Aviv University
- Etymology: "The Sheikh Muwannis"
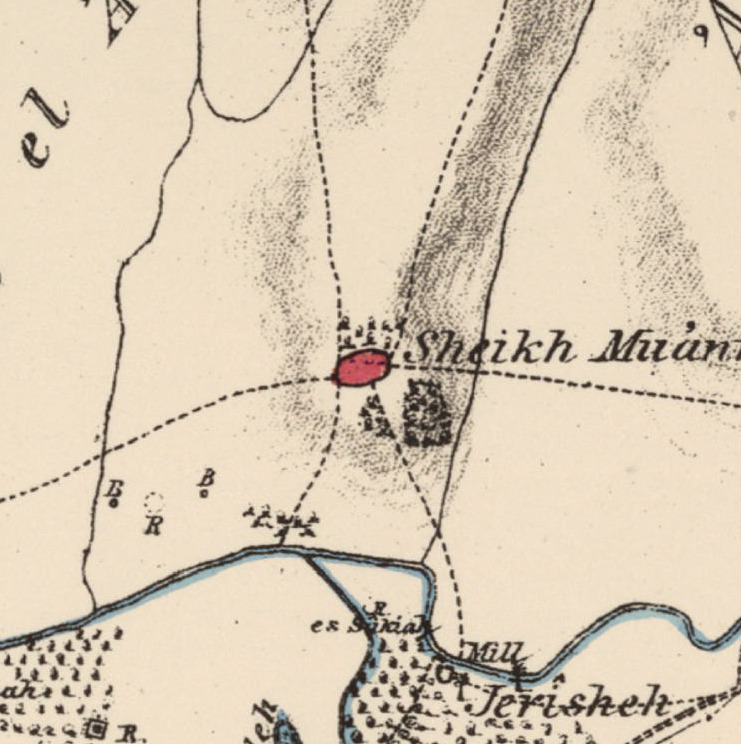
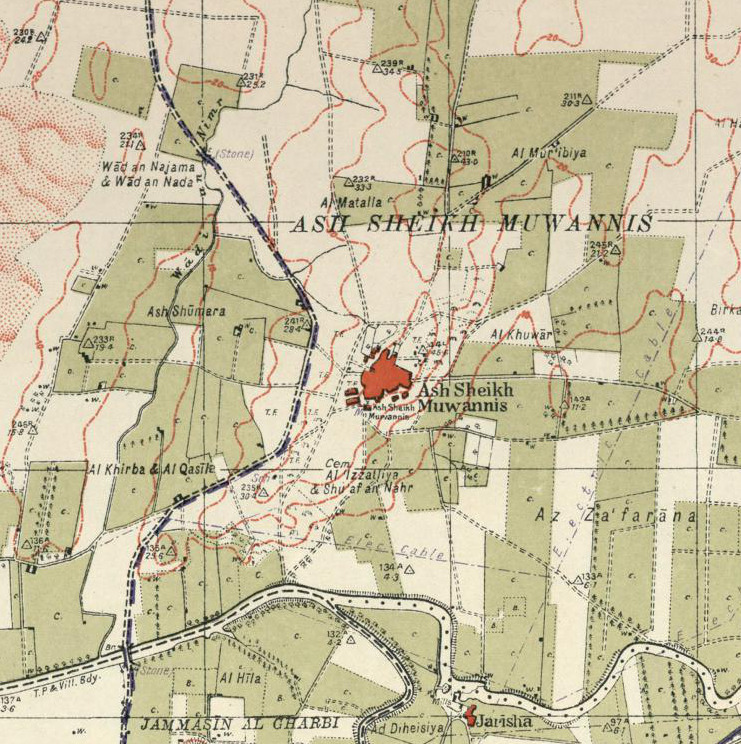
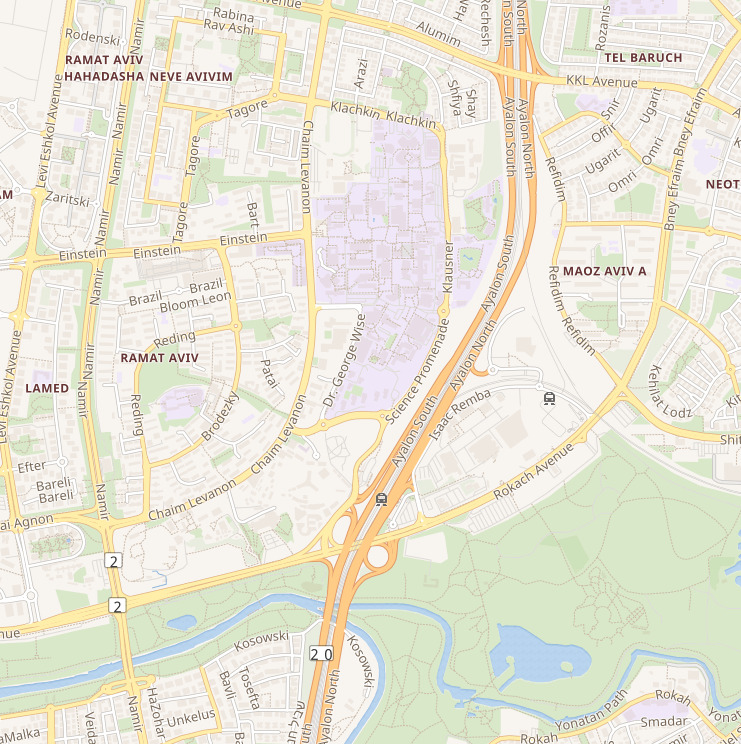
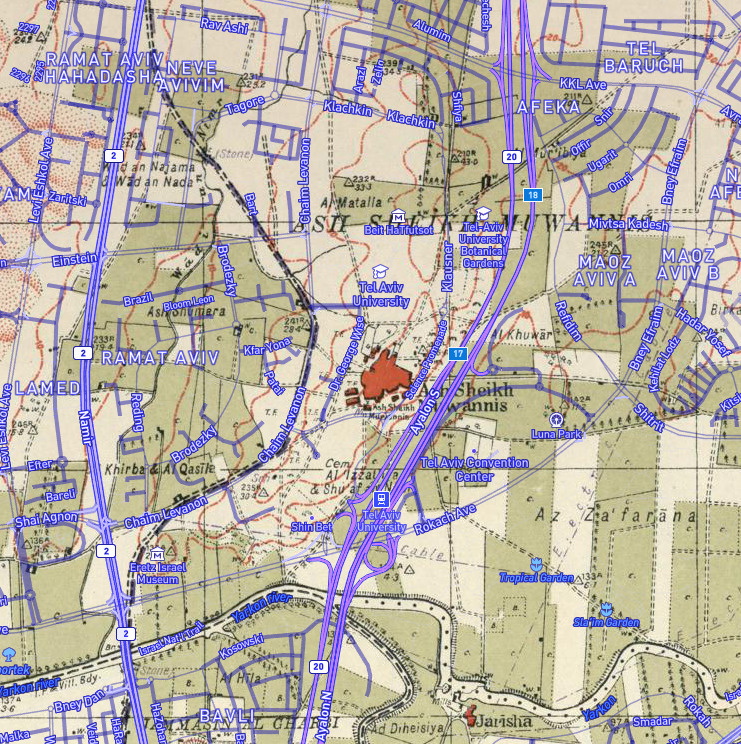
- 1870s map 1940s map modern map 1940s with modern overlay map A series of historical maps of the area around Al-Shaykh Muwannis (click the buttons)

- Location within Mandatory Palestine
- Coordinates: 32°06′30″N 34°48′15″E
- Palestine grid: 131/168
- Geopolitical entity: Mandatory Palestine
- Subdistrict: Jaffa
- Date of depopulation: March 30, 1948

Area
  - Total: 15,972 dunams (15.972 km^{2}; 6.167 sq mi)

Population (1945)
  - Total: 1,930
- Cause(s) of depopulation: Military assault by Yishuv forces
- Secondary cause: Fear of being caught up in the fighting
- Current Localities: Tel Aviv

Al-Shaykh Muwannis (Arabic: الشيخ مونّس), also Sheikh Munis, was a small Palestinian Arab village in the Jaffa Subdistrict of Mandatory Palestine, located approximately 8.5 kilometers from the center of Jaffa city in territory earmarked for Jewish statehood under the UN Partition Plan. The village was abandoned in March 1948 due to the threats of Jewish militias, two months before the 1948 Arab–Israeli war. Today, Tel Aviv University lies on part of the village land.

== History ==
According to local legend, the village was named for a local religious figure, al-Shaykh Muwannis, whose maqam was in the village.

=== Ottoman era ===
Al-Shaykh Muwannis was founded in the 18th century. The original inhabitants of Al-Shaykh Muwannis came from Hajjah in the Samarian Hills. In 1670, groups of the al-Jubārāt beduins settled in Hajjah and gradually displaced most of the earlier residents, who relocated to coastal plain villages such as Ijlil and al-Shaykh Muwannis, established on waqf lands of Sayyidna ʿAlī under the authority of the al-Jayyusi family who resided for a time at Hajjah. The establishment of al-Shaykh Muwannis predated Napoleon's campaign to Egypt and Syria, as Pierre Jacotin named the village Dahr on his map from 1799.

Al-Shaykh Muwannis was noted in December 1821, as being "located on a hill surrounded by muddy land that was flooded with water despite the moderate winter". In 1856 the village was named Sheikh Muennis on Kiepert's map of Palestine published that year.

In 1870, Victor Guérin noted about al-Shaykh Muwannis: "It contains four hundred inhabitants and is divided into several quarters, each under the jurisdiction of a particular sheikh. On the outskirts one can note some gardens where succulent watermelons grow, with hardly any horticultural care." In 1882, the PEF's Survey of Western Palestine (SWP) noted "ruins of a house near the kubbeh", while Al-Shaykh Muwannis was described as an ordinary adobe village. Most of the villagers were members of the Abu Kishk tribe.

The village population was 315 in 1879.

=== British Mandate era ===
In the 1922 census of Palestine conducted by the British Mandate authorities, Shaik Muannes had a population of 664 residents, all Muslims. This had increased in the 1931 census when Esh Sheikh Muwannis had 1154 inhabitants, still all Muslims, in 273 houses.

In the 1920s, the government of the British mandate attempted to gain title to lands lying to the west of Al-Shaykh Muwannis and extending to the coast of the Mediterranean Sea on the grounds that it was "waste and uncultivated." According to the authors of a book on the Israeli-Arab conflict, the Arabs of the Jaffa-Tel Aviv region "understood the implications of the Zionist-cum-British discourses of development generally and their implementation through town planning schemes." In 1937, the Arabic daily al Ja'miah al-Islamiyya commented on British plans to build a bypass road for Tel Aviv residents on what they claimed were village lands: "[I]n reality the plan in the Town Planning Commission now including Sheikh Muwannis is not really a 'plan', but rather a plan to take the land out of the hands of its owners."

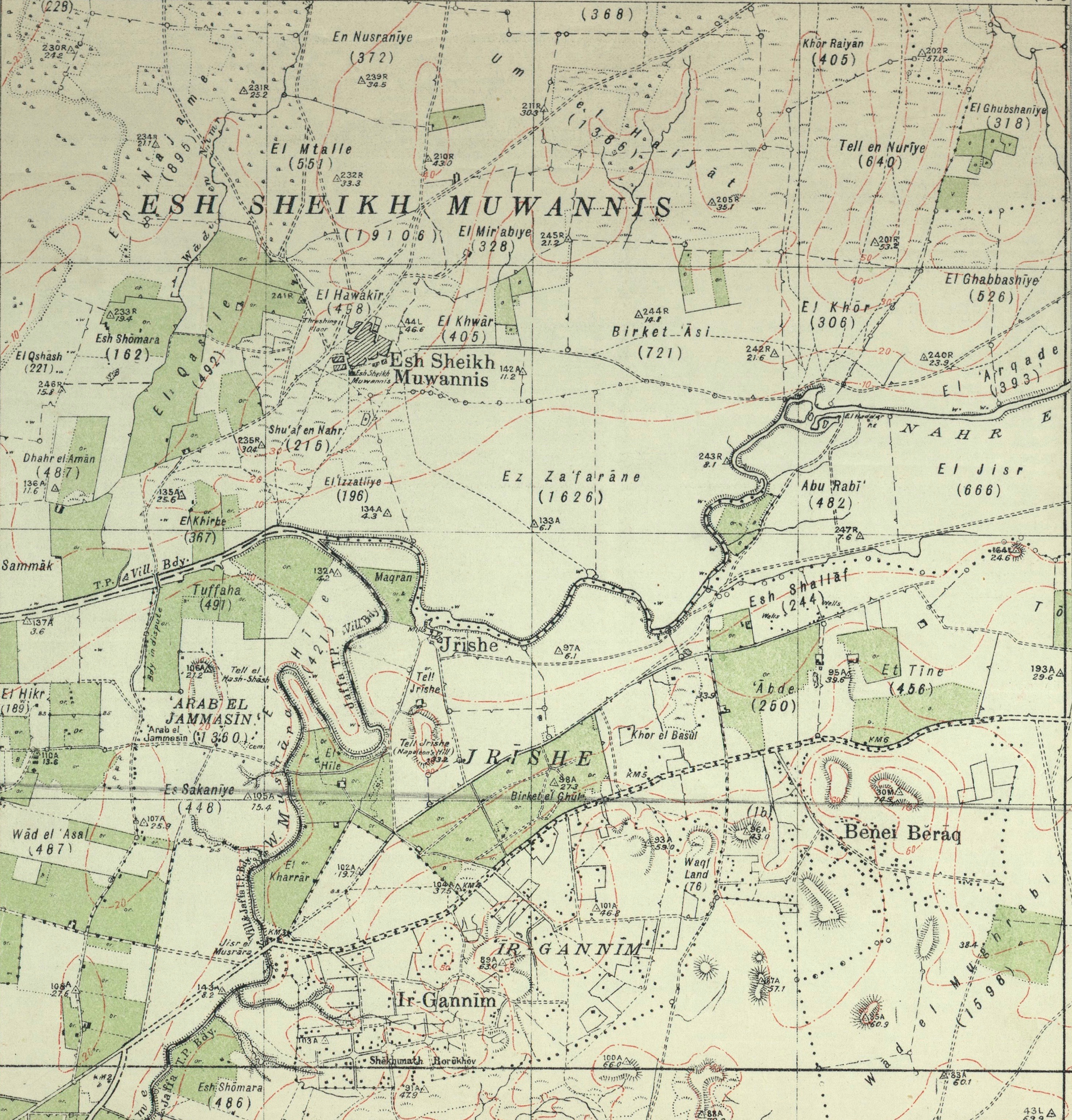
Survey of Palestine 1932 1:20,000

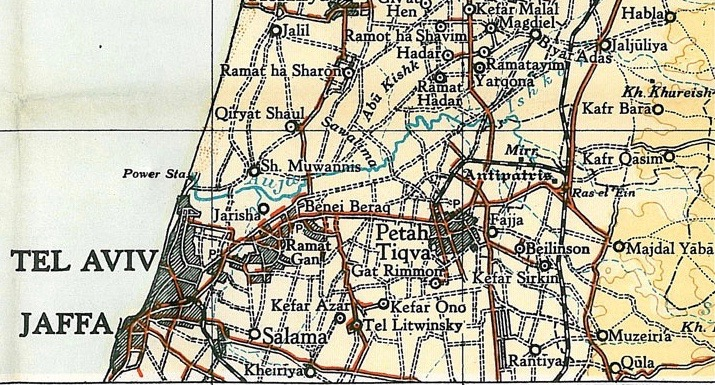
Survey of Palestine 1945 1:250,000

There were two schools in the village, a boys' school built in 1932 and a girls' school built in 1943. 266 students were registered in these schools in 1945. The villagers worked in agriculture, particularly citrus cultivation. In the 1945 statistics, 3,749 dunums were used for growing citrus and bananas, and 7,165 dunums of village land was used for cereals. 66 dunums were irrigated or used for orchards, irrigation water was drawn from al-Awja river and a large number of artesian wells. 41 dunams of village lands were classified as built-up areas.

In 1946, three Arab villagers raped a Jewish girl. In the midst of the court proceedings, members of the Haganah shot and wounded one of the attackers, and kidnapped and castrated another. In 1947, in the wake of growing hostility in the days leading up to the war, some of the villagers began to leave. Most stayed, as village notables had secured Haganah protection in exchange for keeping the peace and preventing Arab Liberation Army (ALA) irregulars from using the village to attack Yishuv forces.

Before the 1948 war, the population of al-Shaykh Muwannis was 2,000.

== 1948 war and aftermath ==
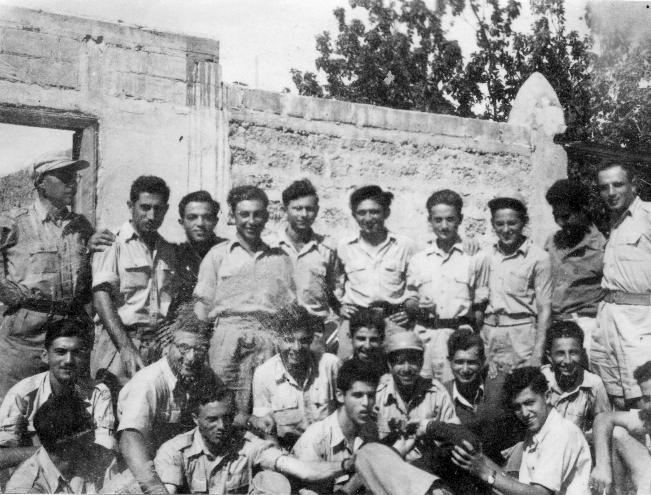
Members of Harel Brigade on technical training course at Al-Shaykh Muwannis, 1948

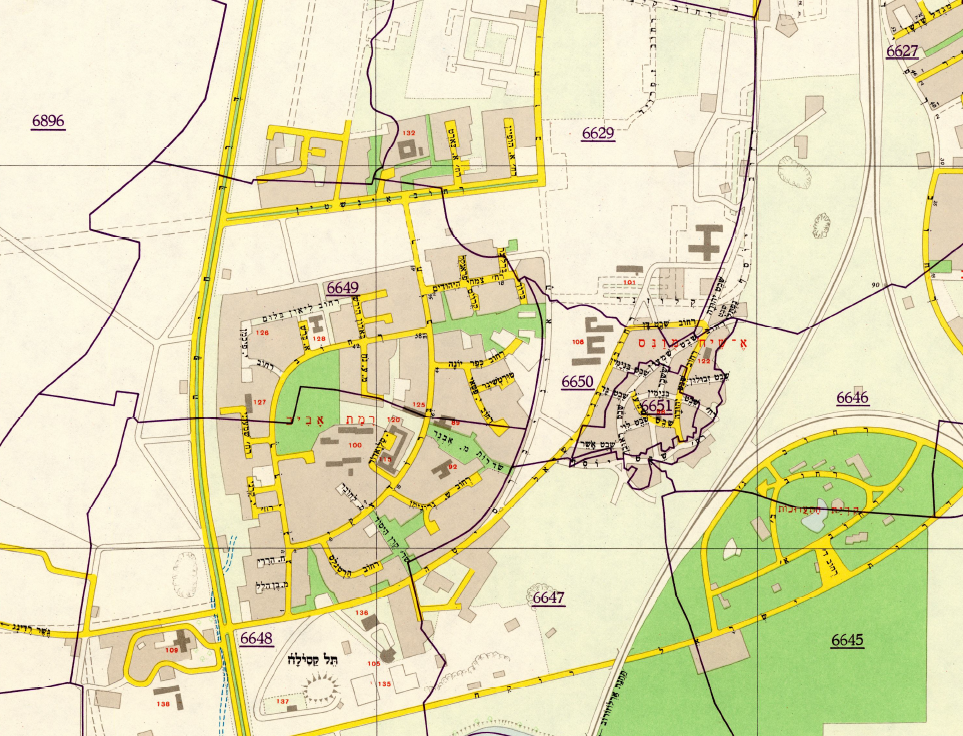
1964 map of Ramat Aviv, being recently established, adjacent to what was left of Al-Shaykh Muwannis village and the planned roadways of Tel Aviv University.

In 1948, the population was largely made up of fellaheen who enjoyed friendly relations with Jews, despite occasional tension. While occasional shots were fired from the village toward Jewish residential areas in January and February 1948, there were no casualties, and the Abu Kishk abided by their promise to keep out ALA irregulars. The emissary of the ALA was informed by the Abu Kishk that "the Arabs of the area will cooperate with the Jews against any outside force that tries to enter."

Some intelligence reports, which were never corroborated, suggested that in early 1948 the village, which overlooked both the Sde Dov Airport and the Reading Power Station, was being infiltrated by heavily armed Arab irregulars. On 7 March, the Haganah's Alexandroni Brigade imposed a 'quarantine' on the village by closing off all access roads to it and the two smaller satellite villages of Jalil al Shamaliyya and Jalil al Qibliya and may even have occupied houses on the edge of the village. The underground Stern Gang (LHI) maintained one of its encampments in the village, and, five days later, on 12 March, militants from either the Irgun or Lehi groups kidnapped five village notables. The Jewish Intelligence Services noted that "many of the villagers ... began fleeing following the abduction of the notables of Sheikh Muwannis. The Arab learned that it was not enough to reach an agreement with the Haganah and that there were 'other Jews' of whom to beware, and possibly to be aware of more than the Haganah, which had not control over them."

The villagers then protested that Jewish forces in the area were subjecting them to intimidation, looting and shooting at them randomly. The notables were turned over to the Haganah on the 23 March and returned to Shaykh Muwannis, but many villagers left out of fear. Tawfiq Abu Kishk threw a large parting 'banquet' for the remaining villagers and their Jewish friends on the 28 March 1948. The village lands were allocated for Jewish use and incorporated into the municipality of Tel Aviv.

In the days following, the Abu Kishk leaders attributed their abandonment of the village to: a) the [Haganah] roadblocks ... b) the [Haganah] limitations on movement by foot, c) the theft of vehicles, and d) the kidnapping of Sheikh Muwannis men. Many villagers of Shaykh Muwannis resettled in Qalqilya and Tulkarem.

According to the Palestinian historian Walid Khalidi, the village's remaining structures in 1992 consisted of several houses occupied by Jewish families and the wall of a house. Soon after the war, they were used to accommodate members of the new Israeli Air Force and men from Mahal units. From 1949, Jews from North Africa were housed there temporarily, after which it became part of the campus of Tel Aviv University. The former home of the village sheikh, known as the 'Green House', serves as the university's faculty club. The Israeli historian Shlomo Sand suggested to the Tel Aviv University to set up a museum in the 'Green House' to commemorate the Nakba of the uprooted inhabitants of Al-Shaykh Muwannis.

In a right of return march organized by the Israeli group Zochrot on Nakba Day in 2004, participants called upon the Tel Aviv municipality to name six streets in the city after Palestinian villages that had existed there until 1948, among them, Al-Shaykh Muwannis.

== See also ==
- Depopulated Palestinian locations in Israel

== Bibliography ==
- Barron, J.B., ed. (1923). Palestine: Report and General Abstracts of the Census of 1922. Government of Palestine.
- Conder, C.R.; Kitchener, H.H. (1882). The Survey of Western Palestine: Memoirs of the Topography, Orography, Hydrography, and Archaeology. Vol. 2. London: Committee of the Palestine Exploration Fund.
- Government of Palestine, Department of Statistics (1945). Village Statistics, April, 1945.
- Guérin, V. (1875). Description Géographique Historique et Archéologique de la Palestine (in French). Vol. 2: Samarie, pt. 2. Paris: L'Imprimerie Nationale.
- Hadawi, S. (1970). Village Statistics of 1945: A Classification of Land and Area ownership in Palestine. Palestine Liberation Organization Research Center. Archived from the original on 2018-12-08.
- Karmon, Y. (1960). "An Analysis of Jacotin's Map of Palestine" (PDF). Israel Exploration Journal. 10 (3, 4): 155–173, 244–253. Archived from the original (PDF) on 2017-12-01.
- Khalidi, W. (1992). All That Remains: The Palestinian Villages Occupied and Depopulated by Israel in 1948. Washington D.C.: Institute for Palestine Studies. ISBN 0-88728-224-5.
- Mills, E., ed. (1932). Census of Palestine 1931. Population of Villages, Towns and Administrative Areas. Jerusalem: Government of Palestine.
- Morris, B. (2004). The Birth of the Palestinian Refugee Problem Revisited. Cambridge University Press. ISBN 0-521-00967-7.
- Palmer, E.H. (1881). The Survey of Western Palestine: Arabic and English Name Lists Collected During the Survey by Lieutenants Conder and Kitchener, R. E. Transliterated and Explained by E.H. Palmer. Committee of the Palestine Exploration Fund.
- Pappe, I. (1999). The Israel/Palestine Question. Routledge. ISBN 0-415-16947-X.
- Sand, S. (2012). The Invention of the Land of Israel: From Holy Land to Homeland. Verso Books. ISBN 978-1-84467-946-1.
- Sufian, Sandra Marlene; LeVine, M. (2007). Reapproaching borders: new perspectives on the study of Israel-Palestine. Rowman & Littlefield. ISBN 978-0-7425-4639-4.
