= Rafidiya =

- Place

Arabic transcription(s)
  - Arabic: رفيديا
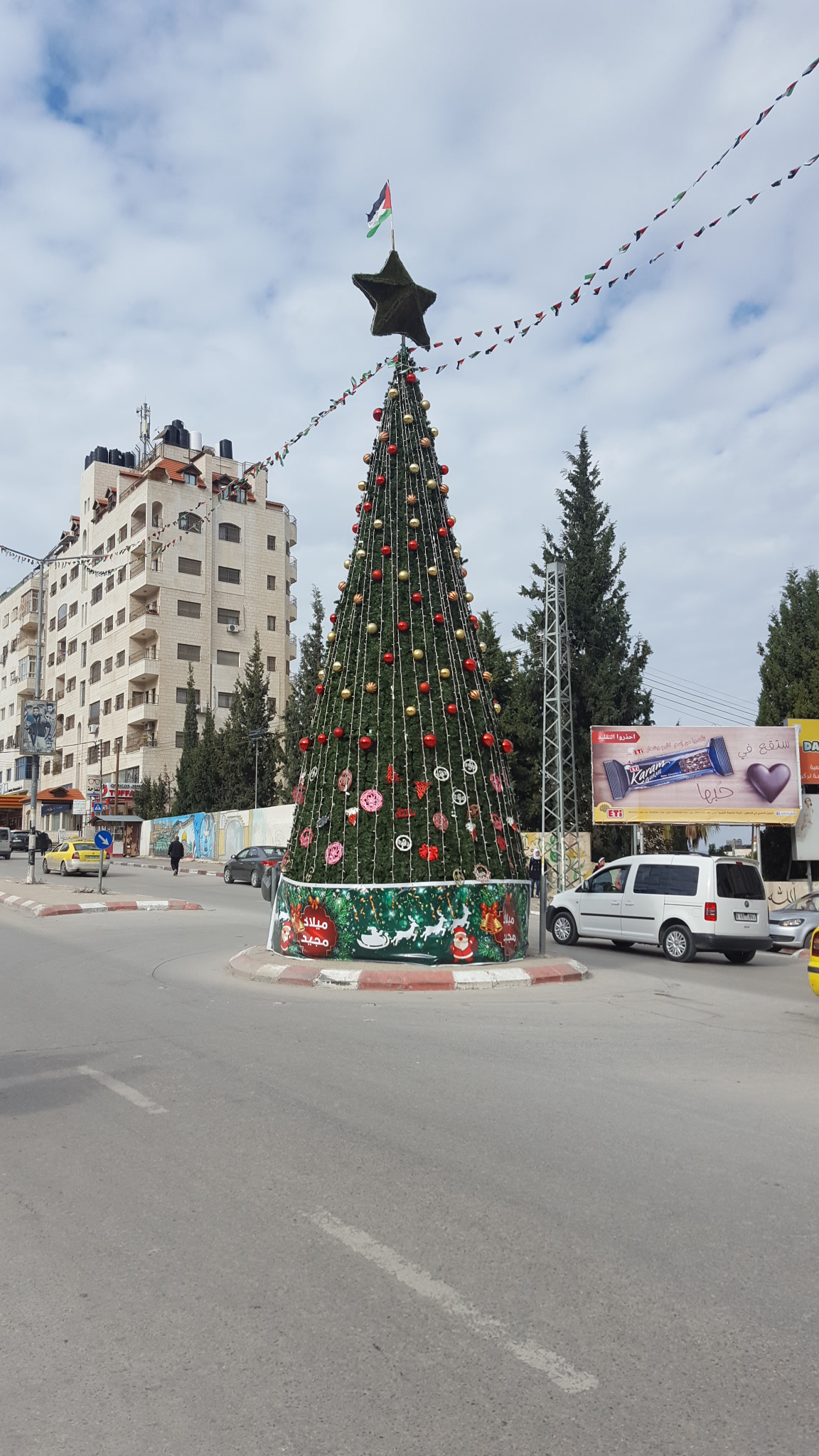
- Christmas tree, Rafidiya, 2016

- Location of Rafidiya within Palestine
- Coordinates: 32°12′20.30″N 35°14′04.58″E
- Palestine grid: 172/181
- State: State of Palestine
- Governorate: Nablus
- Name meaning: "The infidels"

Rafidiya (Arabic: رفيديا) is a neighborhood in the western part of the Palestinian city of Nablus. It was a separate village until it was merged into the municipality in 1966. In 1961, Rafidiya had 923 inhabitants, rising to 1,200 in 1983.

== History ==
The remains of a Crusader church was found by Victor Guérin in 1863; "today divided into ten or so rooms [..] inhabited by a number of families. This church, oriented from west to east was formerly dedicated to St George." Today it is not possible to identify this building, as several buildings in Rafidiya incorporate sections of old walls, but Bagatti identified a wall at the north end of the village as being of Crusader origin.

In 1882, SWP observed "foundations of a wall of good squared masonry, not drafted," south of the village.

=== Ottoman era ===
The village was incorporated into the Ottoman Empire in 1517 with all of Palestine, and in 1596 it appeared in the tax registers under the name of Rafidya, as being in the nahiyah of Jabal Qubal, part of Nablus Sanjak. It had a population of nine Muslim households and six Muslim bachelors, and 85 Christian households. The villagers paid a fixed tax-rate of 33,3 % on agricultural products, including wheat, barley, summer crops, olive trees, goats and/or beehives, in addition to occasional revenues and a press for olive oil or grape syrup; a total of 2000 akçe.

Rafidia was at one time owned by the prominent Tuqan family of Nablus. They ceded it to an Arab Christian family with Ghassanid origins from al-Karak, in modern-day Jordan in the 17th century. According to tradition, the family, consisting of a father, and his three sons and daughter had fled al-Karak to avoid marrying the daughter, Rafid, to Emir Udwan, a Muslim prince of the city. They initially migrated to Taybeh through the Dead Sea, but then moved north towards Nablus. At the time, there was one Muslim family in the area, al-Hassouneh, and after the Christian family settled, the two families split the land and the water between themselves equally. The village was named "Rafidia" in honor of Rafid.

A map from Napoleon's invasion of 1799 by Pierre Jacotin named it Rafidiyeh, as a village by the road from Jaffa to Nablus.

Rafidiya was destroyed during the invasion of Zahir al-Umar. It was resettled, perhaps in the 19th century, by Christians from Transjordan, as well as Christians from Beit Jala and Lod. Some have origins in Kafr Qaddum.

In 1838, Robinson found the village to be entirely Christian, and said to contain "115 taxable men, or nearly 500 inhabitants." It was noted as being in the Jurat 'Amra district, south of Nablus. In 1863, Guérin found the village to have 300 inhabitants, almost all "Schismatic Greek" families, about 40 Catholic and the rest Muslims.

In 1870/1871 (1288 AH), an Ottoman census listed the village with a population of 70 households in the nahiya (sub-district) of Jamma'in al-Awwal, subordinate to Nablus.

In 1882, the Palestine Exploration Fund's Survey of Western Palestine, (SWP), described Rafidia as "a good-sized village on the hill-side, with a spring above it to the north-east and vegetable gardens below. The inhabitants are Greek Christians....A Protestant school is conspicuous in the middle of the village".

=== British Mandate era ===
In the 1922 census of Palestine conducted by the British Mandate authorities, Rafidiya had a population of 438; 111 Muslims and 307 Christians, where the Christians were 206 Orthodox, 44 Roman Catholics, 1 Melkite and 56 Church of England. The population decreased at the time of the 1931 census to 355; 68 Muslims and 287 Christians, in 88 houses.

In the 1945 statistics Rafidiya had a population of 430; 80 Muslims and 350 Christians, with 2,004 dunams of land, according to an official land and population survey, Of this, 447 dunams were plantations and irrigable land, 1,168 used for cereals, while 32 dunams were built-up land.

=== Jordanian era ===
In the wake of the 1948 Arab–Israeli War, Rafidiya came under Jordanian rule.

In 1961, the population of Rafidiya was 923, of whom 361 were Christian ( 39.11%).

=== Post-1967 ===
Since the Six-Day War in 1967, the town has been under Israeli occupation. The population of Rafidiya in the 1967 census conducted by Israel was 1,123, of whom 183 originated from the Israeli territory.

== Churches ==
The Church of St. Justinus of Nablus is a Roman Catholic church built in 1887. In 1907, the Rosary sisterhood arrived in Nablus and Rafidia to serve the Latin Patriarch of Jerusalem and assist the priest in the service of the church by visiting the families and teaching children. They also set up the Rosary Sisters School in Nablus and Rafidiya. As a result of the earthquake that hit Nablus in 1927, the church was damaged, but the Patriarchate renovated it and the church was reopened in 1931.

The Church of St. Justinus underwent further renovation and expansion throughout various periods. In 1956, the new bell tower was built and the church was expanded, and then in 1980, the church was again renovated, expanded and painted with frescos and adorned with stained glass windows with church-related drawings.

The Protestant Church of St. Matthew the Anglican was formerly a house that was rented in 1932 by the parish. The guest room was used as the church and the other rooms were used as a school for the church from that date on. It was never built as a church, but a house rented out to become a church and a Protestant school.

== See also ==
- Palestinian Christians

== Bibliography ==
- Barron, J.B., ed. (1923). Palestine: Report and General Abstracts of the Census of 1922. Government of Palestine.
- Conder, C.R.; Kitchener, H.H. (1882). The Survey of Western Palestine: Memoirs of the Topography, Orography, Hydrography, and Archaeology. Vol. 2. London: Committee of the Palestine Exploration Fund.
- Ellenblum, R. (2003). Frankish Rural Settlement in the Latin Kingdom of Jerusalem. Cambridge University Press. ISBN 9780521521871. (pp. 125 n. 17, 224, 248, 250)
- Government of Jordan, Department of Statistics (1964). First Census of Population and Housing. Volume I: Final Tables; General Characteristics of the Population (PDF).
- Government of Palestine, Department of Statistics (1945). Village Statistics, April, 1945.
- Guérin, V. (1875). Description Géographique Historique et Archéologique de la Palestine (in French). Vol. 2: Samarie, pt. 2. Paris: L'Imprimerie Nationale. (p. 184)
- Hadawi, S. (1970). Village Statistics of 1945: A Classification of Land and Area ownership in Palestine. Palestine Liberation Organization Research Center.
- Hütteroth, W.-D.; Abdulfattah, K. (1977). Historical Geography of Palestine, Transjordan and Southern Syria in the Late 16th Century. Erlanger Geographische Arbeiten, Sonderband 5. Erlangen, Germany: Vorstand der Fränkischen Geographischen Gesellschaft. ISBN 3-920405-41-2.
- Karmon, Y. (1960). "An Analysis of Jacotin's Map of Palestine" (PDF). Israel Exploration Journal. 10 (3, 4): 155–173, 244–253. Archived from the original (PDF) on 2019-12-22.
- Mills, E., ed. (1932). Census of Palestine 1931. Population of Villages, Towns and Administrative Areas. Jerusalem: Government of Palestine.
- Palmer, E.H. (1881). The Survey of Western Palestine: Arabic and English Name Lists Collected During the Survey by Lieutenants Conder and Kitchener, R. E. Transliterated and Explained by E.H. Palmer. Committee of the Palestine Exploration Fund.
- Petersen, Andrew (2005). The Towns of Palestine Under Muslim Rule. British Archaeological Reports. ISBN 1841718211.
- Pringle, D. (1997). Secular buildings in the Crusader Kingdom of Jerusalem: an archaeological Gazetter. Cambridge University Press. ISBN 9780521460101.
- Pringle, D. (1998). The Churches of the Crusader Kingdom of Jerusalem: Volume II L-Z (excluding Tyre). Cambridge University Press. ISBN 0-521-39037-0.
- Robinson, E.; Smith, E. (1841). Biblical Researches in Palestine, Mount Sinai and Arabia Petraea: A Journal of Travels in the year 1838. Vol. 3. Boston: Crocker & Brewster.
