= Hajjah, Palestine =

Hajjah
- Municipality type D (Village council)

Arabic transcription(s)
  - Arabic: حجة
  - Latin: Hajjah (official); Haja (unofficial)
- Location of Hajjah within Palestine
- Coordinates: 32°12′17″N 35°07′50″E
- Palestine grid: 162/179
- State: State of Palestine
- Governorate: Qalqilya

Government
  - Type: Village council
- Elevation: 409 m (1,342 ft)

Population (2017)
  - Total: 2,659
- Name meaning: Kuryet Hajja, The town of Hajja, from personal name, or "Pathway"

Hajjah (Arabic: حجة) is a Palestinian village in the northern West Bank, located eighteen kilometers west of Nablus in the Qalqilya Governorate of the State of Palestine. According to the Palestinian Central Bureau of Statistics, the town had a population of 2,659 inhabitants in 2017.

Hajjah features remains from the Israelite, Byzantine, and Early Muslim periods. There are claims it is likely to have hosted inhabitants from the Tribe of Menashe. In the Roman and Byzantine eras, it has been identified as Kfar Hagai or Kiryat Hagga, a Samaritan village, with mentions in ancient inscriptions and Samaritan sources. The village was inhabited by Samaritans through the Byzantine and Early Islamic periods, evident from the discovery of Mikvehs and stone menorahs. Under Mamluk rule, a mosque was constructed.

The village's en-Naby Rabbah shrine, atop a tell, is believed to be the tomb of a saint, which has been suggested by one historian to be Baba Rabba, a 4th-century Samaritan leader, serving as a guardian of crops. This site was declared a nature reserve in 1986.

== Location ==
Hajja is located 15.9 kilometers (9.9 mi) east of Qalqiliya. It is bordered by Kafr Qaddum and Immatin to the east, Al Funduq and Jinsafut to the south, Kafr ‘Abbush, Kafr Laqif and Baqat al-Hatab to the west, and Kur to the north.

== History and archaeology ==
Potsherds from the Iron Age, Byzantine and Early Muslim periods have been found at Hajja.

Jewish scholars claim that during the Iron Age, Hajjah hosted inhabitants from the Israelite Tribe of Menashe.

=== Iron Age ===
The earliest potsherds indicate that Hajja was inhabited during the Iron Age, with some claims it was likely inhabited by the Tribe of Menashe.

=== Hellenistic to Byzantine period ===
Archaeologist Yitzhak Magen identified Hajja with Kfar Hagai (כפר חגי), an ancient Samaritan village from the Hellenistic period. A votive inscription of the third or second century BCE from Mount Gerizim, the holiest site in Samaritanism and then the site of a major temple, reads "That which Ḥaggai son of Qimi from Kfar Ḥaggai offered".

In later Samaritan sources, the village is referred to as "Kiryat Hagga (קרית חגה), the current Arabic name being a direct rendition. It was mentioned as the birthplace of Baba Rabba, who built several synagogues in the area, including in the village of Hagga. The Tolidah, a Samaritan historical work, mentions a man named Geber Ben-Karmi of Kiryat Hagga. Mikvehs found in the village indicate that Samaritans inhabited the village during the Byzantine and Early Islamic periods.

A field survey by Ze'ev Erlich and Meir Roiter discovered five stone menorah reliefs in Hajjah, some accompanied by plant decorations, repurposed on contemporary buildings. Dated by the surveyors to the Byzantine period, these menorahs are believed to have originally adorned Samaritan structures.

=== Mamluk period ===
During the reign of the Mamluk sultan An-Nasir Muhammad, in AH 722/1322 CE, a mosque was constructed in the village. A minaret was added to it in AH 735/1334-35 CE. These building were done in the name of Muhammed bin Musa bin Ahmed, a local imam, whose grave stone is also by the mosque, dating his death to AH 749/1348 CE.

=== Ottoman period ===
Hajja was incorporated into the Ottoman Empire in 1517 with all of Palestine, and in 1596 it appeared in the tax registers as being in the nahiya of Bani Sa'b of the liwa of Nablus. It had a population of 96 households, all Muslims. The villagers paid a fixed tax rate of 33.3% on various agricultural products, such as wheat, barley, summer crops, olive trees, goats and/or beehives, in addition to "occasional revenues", a press for olive oil or grape syrup, and a tax for people of the Nablus region; a total of 19,200 akçe. All of the revenues went to a waqf.

The original inhabitants of al-Hajjah belonged to the al-Samali clan, including Samaritans who had converted to Islam. In 1670, groups of the al-Jubārāt beduins settled in the village and gradually displaced most of the earlier residents, who relocated to coastal plain villages such as Ijlil and al-Shaykh Muwannis, established on waqf lands of Sayyidna ʿAlī under the authority of the al-Jayyusi family who resided for a time in the village.

In 1838, Edward Robinson noted Kuryet Hajja as a village in Beni Sa'ab district, west of Nablus, while in 1870 Victor Guérin noted it from Fara'ata.

In 1870-71 (AH 1288), an Ottoman census listed the village in the nahiya (sub-district) of Bani Sa'b.

In 1882 the PEF's Survey of Western Palestine (SWP) noted about Kuryet Hajja: "A good-sized village on high ground, supplied by wells. It has a rock-cut tomb on the west, and appears to be an ancient place."

The village's en-Naby Rabbah shrine, atop a tell. This site was declared a nature reserve in 1986.

=== British Mandate ===
In the 1922 census of Palestine conducted by the British Mandate authorities, Qariyet Hajjeh had a population of 642 inhabitants, all Muslims, increasing in the 1931 census to 731 Muslims, with 206 houses.

In the 1945 statistics, the population was 960 Muslims, with 13,119 dunams of land, according to an official land and population survey. Of this, 4 dunams were for citrus and bananas, 1,226 dunams were for plantations or irrigated land, 5,045 were for cereals, while 36 dunams were built-up land.

=== Jordanian period ===
In the wake of the 1948 Arab–Israeli War, and after the 1949 Armistice Agreements, Hajjah came under Jordanian rule.

The Jordanian census of 1961 found 1,093 inhabitants.

=== 1967-present ===
Since the Six-Day War in 1967, Hajjah has been under Israeli occupation.

After the 1995 accords, 37.2% of village land was assigned as Area B land, while the remaining 62.8% is assigned Area C.

Israel has confiscated 216 dunams of land from Hajja to establish two Israeli settlements, Karne Shomron and Neve Oramin, with the remainder of the land for these two settlements taken from Jinsafut, Kafr Laqif and Deir Istiya). Israel has also confiscated land from Hajja to build bypass roads and the Israeli West Bank barrier.

== Demographics ==
Hajjah is considered the initial center of the Bani Sa'b tribe. Historically, it has absorbed Bedouins from the Arab al-Jabarat group. The current residents of Hajjah are united in several clans (hamulas), including the Batta-Hamed, Masalha, Da'as, Tayyun and Farhat clans, among others.

Some families in the village are believed by locals to be the descendants of Samaritan families which had lived in the village until the Middle Ages, when they converted to Islam. The "Al-Tzipi" clan, descendants of the Samaritan Zipor HaMatari family, still live in the village.

== Sites ==
A tell topped by a shrine, known as en-Naby Rabbah, is situated 419 meters west of the village. Local residents claim that this shrine marks the tomb of a saint, identified as one of Jacob's grandsons. This saint lacks recognition within mainstream Islam, and no tomb is present at the site. Moshe Sharon suggests that the saint's name may preserve the memory of Baba Rabba, a prominent Samaritan leader from the 4th century known for constructing a synagogue at Hajjah. The locals believe that the saint acts as a guardian for their crops. The site and its surroundings were designated as a nature reserve in 1986.

== Notable people ==
- Mahmoud Da'as aka Abu Khalid (1934–2009), high-ranking Palestine Liberation Organisation commander

== Bibliography ==
- Barron, J.B., ed. (1923). Palestine: Report and General Abstracts of the Census of 1922. Government of Palestine.
- Conder, C.R. (1876). "Samarian Topography". Quarterly Statement - Palestine Exploration Fund. 8 (4): 182–197. doi:10.1179/peq.1876.8.4.182.
- Conder, C.R.; Kitchener, H.H. (1882). The Survey of Western Palestine: Memoirs of the Topography, Orography, Hydrography, and Archaeology. Vol. 2. London: Committee of the Palestine Exploration Fund.
- Dauphin, C. (1998). La Palestine byzantine, Peuplement et Populations. BAR International Series 726 (in French). Vol. III : Catalogue. Oxford: Archeopress. ISBN 0-860549-05-4.
- Government of Jordan, Department of Statistics (1964). First Census of Population and Housing. Volume I: Final Tables; General Characteristics of the Population (PDF).
- Government of Palestine, Department of Statistics (1945). Village Statistics, April, 1945.
- Guérin, V. (1875). Description Géographique Historique et Archéologique de la Palestine (in French). Vol. 2: Samarie, pt. 2. Paris: L'Imprimerie Nationale.
- Hadawi, S. (1970). Village Statistics of 1945: A Classification of Land and Area ownership in Palestine. Palestine Liberation Organization Research Center.
- Hütteroth, W.-D.; Abdulfattah, K. (1977). Historical Geography of Palestine, Transjordan and Southern Syria in the Late 16th Century. Erlanger Geographische Arbeiten, Sonderband 5. Erlangen, Germany: Vorstand der Fränkischen Geographischen Gesellschaft. ISBN 3-920405-41-2.
- Mills, E., ed. (1932). Census of Palestine 1931. Population of Villages, Towns and Administrative Areas. Jerusalem: Government of Palestine.
- Palmer, E.H. (1881). The Survey of Western Palestine: Arabic and English Name Lists Collected During the Survey by Lieutenants Conder and Kitchener, R. E. Transliterated and Explained by E.H. Palmer. Committee of the Palestine Exploration Fund.
- Robinson, E.; Smith, E. (1841). Biblical Researches in Palestine, Mount Sinai and Arabia Petraea: A Journal of Travels in the year 1838. Vol. 3. Boston: Crocker & Brewster.
- Sharon, M. (2013). Corpus Inscriptionum Arabicarum Palaestinae, H-I. Vol. 5. BRILL. ISBN 978-90-04-25097-0.
