= Immatain =

Town in the West Bank, Palestine

Immatin
- Municipality type D (Village council)

Arabic transcription(s)
  - Arabic: إمّاتين
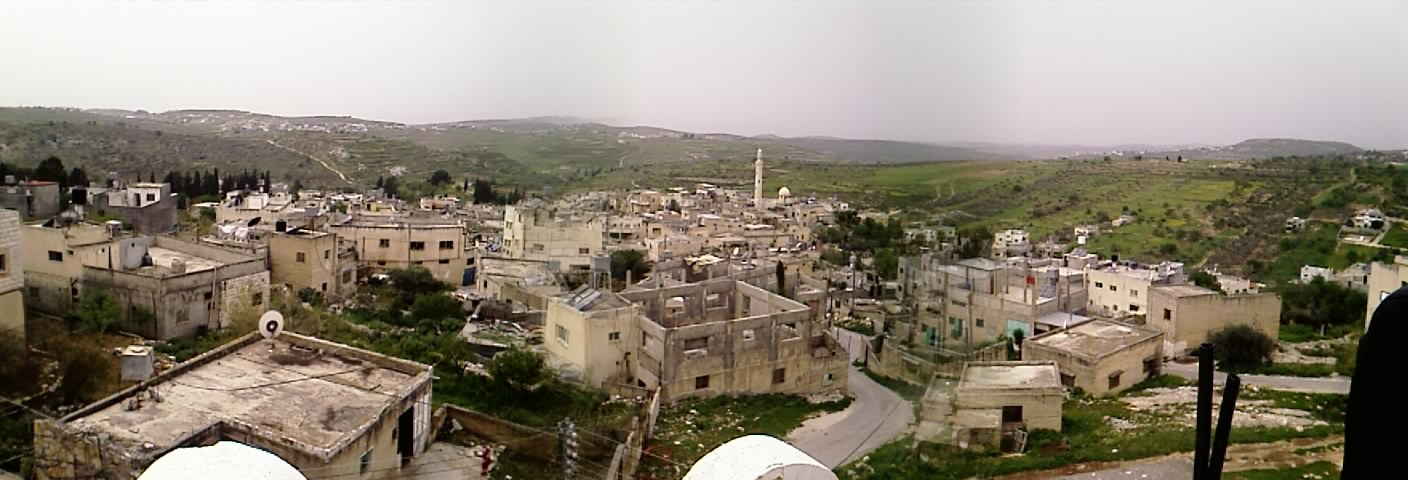
- Viewpoint of Immatin

- Location of Immatain within Palestine
- Coordinates: 32°11′31″N 35°09′27″E
- Palestine grid: 165/177
- State: State of Palestine
- Governorate: Qalqilya
- Founded: 1250 (estimate)

Government
  - Type: Village council
  - Head of Municipality: Haythem Sameer Sawan

Area
  - Total: 10.0 km^{2} (3.9 sq mi)
- Elevation: 432–518 m (1,417–1,699 ft)

Population (2017)
  - Total: 2,755
  - Density: 275/km^{2} (714/sq mi)
- Name meaning: Amatin p.n.,

Immatin (Arabic: إماتين), sometimes spelled Immatain, is a Palestinian village located in the northwestern West Bank, in the Qalqilya Governorate of the State of Palestine, about seventeen kilometers southwest of Nablus.

Since 2012, the village of Farratin is included in Immatin.

== Location ==
Elmatan (including the Far’ata locality) is located 19 kilometers (12 mi) west of Qalqiliya. It is bordered by Tell to the east, Deir Istiya to the south, Jinsafut, Al Funduq and Hajja to the west, and Kafr Qaddum and Jit to the north. The Israeli settlement of Kedumim, which is considered illegal under international law, is about 2 km (1.2 mi) to the north.

== History ==
The newly built mosque and minaret

Immatin has been identified with the Israelite village of Elmatan, which was mentioned in one of the Samaria Ostraca.

Ceramics dating from the Byzantine period have been found in the village.

According to a tradition recalled by a Samaritan High Priest in the 20th century, two hundred Samaritans in Immatin were reportedly forced to convert to Islam by Saladin; however, written sources make no further reference to this event.

=== Ottoman era ===
Immatin was incorporated into the Ottoman Empire in 1517 with all of Palestine, and in 1596 Immatin appeared in the tax registers as Matin, being in the Nahiya of Jabal Qubal of the Liwa of Nablus. It had a population of 20 households and 1 bachelor, all Muslim. The villagers paid a fixed tax rate of 33.3% on a number of crops, including wheat, barley, summer crops, olives, goats and beehives; a total of 3,000 akçe.

In 1838, Amatin was noted as located in Jurat Amra, south of Nablus.

In 1870/1871 (1288 AH), an Ottoman census listed the village with a population of 33 households in the nahiya (sub-district) of Jamma'in al-Awwal, subordinate to Nablus.

In 1882, the PEF's Survey of Western Palestine Immatin was described as "a village of moderates size on the slope of the hill, with a few olives."

=== British Mandate era ===
In the 1922 census of Palestine conducted by the British Mandate authorities, Immatin had a population of 234, all Muslim, increasing in the 1931 census to 334 Muslims in 67 houses.

In the 1945 statistics the population of Immatin was 440, all Muslims, while the total land area was 7,155 dunams, according to an official land and population survey. Of this, 967 were allocated for plantations and irrigable land, 3,067 for cereals, while 32 dunams were classified as built-up (urban) areas.

==== Land ownership of Immatin in 1945 ====
The following is a breakdown of land ownership in 1945.

Ethnic group	Land ownership (dunams)	Land ownership (%)
Arab	7,152	99.9%
Jewish	0	0%
Christian	0	0%
Public	3	0.0004%

==== Land usage of Immatin in 1945 ====
The following is a breakdown of the land usage during 1945 in the dunams.

Land usage type	Arab dunams	Percentage
Irrigated and plantation	967	8%
Area planted with olives	1,042	9%
Area planted with cereal	3,067	25%
Built-up	32	0.3%
Cultivable	4,034	33%
Non-cultivable	3,089	24.7%
Total	12,240	100%

=== Jordanian era ===
In the wake of the 1948 Arab–Israeli War, and after the 1949 Armistice Agreements, Immatin came under Jordanian rule. It was annexed by Jordan in 1950.

The Jordanian census of 1961 found 782 inhabitants in Immatin.

=== Post-1967 ===
Since the Six-Day War in 1967, Immatin has been held under Israeli occupation.

In 1992, 19-year-old Bilal Ahmed Ghanan from Immatain was killed by Israeli soldiers. A photograph of Ghanan's stitched-up body accompanied a Aftonbladet 2009 news article about illegal organ removal allegations in the Israeli Abu Kabir Forensic Institute.

After the 1995 accords, 58.3% of the total village land of Immatin/Far'ata was classified as Area B, while the remaining 41.7% was classified as Area C. Israel has expropriated 163 dunams of land from Immatin for the construction of the Israeli settlement of ‘Sha’ar Emmanuel’, part of the Immanuel settlement.

In 2013, complaints were made over "training exercises" which the Israeli army held in the village. The Guardian reported that “[t]he troops spread out through the village for several hours, withdrawing just before midnight." According to the Israeli army, the exercise was a "navigating run … whose purpose was to acquaint the forces more closely with the relevant sector, as well as demonstrating IDF presence in the area".

== Population ==
According to the Palestinian Central Bureau of Statistics, Immatain had a population of approximately 2,450 inhabitants in mid-year 2006 and 2,755 by 2017. Almost double the amount live abroad for political and economic reasons. Each year, on average two family units emigrate from Immatin. Immatin has four families: Sawwan, Ghanim, Albarree, and Matanee.

Family name	Population est.	Percent of the population
Sawan	1220	49.8%
Ghanim	850	34.7%
Albaree	255	10.4%
Matanee	125	5.1%

=== Population growth (1922–2007) ===
Source:

== Bibliography ==
- Barron, J.B., ed. (1923). Palestine: Report and General Abstracts of the Census of 1922. Government of Palestine.
- Conder, C.R.; Kitchener, H.H. (1882). The Survey of Western Palestine: Memoirs of the Topography, Orography, Hydrography, and Archaeology. Vol. 2. London: Committee of the Palestine Exploration Fund.
- Dauphin, C. (1998). La Palestine byzantine, Peuplement et Populations. BAR International Series 726 (in French). Vol. III : Catalogue. Oxford: Archeopress. ISBN 0-860549-05-4.
- Government of Jordan, Department of Statistics (1964). First Census of Population and Housing. Volume I: Final Tables; General Characteristics of the Population (PDF).
- Government of Palestine, Department of Statistics (1945). Village Statistics, April, 1945.
- Guérin, V. (1875). Description Géographique Historique et Archéologique de la Palestine (in French). Vol. 2: Samarie, pt. 2. Paris: L'Imprimerie Nationale.
- Hadawi, S. (1970). Village Statistics of 1945: A Classification of Land and Area ownership in Palestine. Palestine Liberation Organization Research Center.
- Hütteroth, W.-D.; Abdulfattah, K. (1977). Historical Geography of Palestine, Transjordan and Southern Syria in the Late 16th Century. Erlanger Geographische Arbeiten, Sonderband 5. Erlangen, Germany: Vorstand der Fränkischen Geographischen Gesellschaft. ISBN 3-920405-41-2.
- Mills, E., ed. (1932). Census of Palestine 1931. Population of Villages, Towns and Administrative Areas. Jerusalem: Government of Palestine.
- Palmer, E.H. (1881). The Survey of Western Palestine: Arabic and English Name Lists Collected During the Survey by Lieutenants Conder and Kitchener, R. E. Transliterated and Explained by E.H. Palmer. Committee of the Palestine Exploration Fund.
- Robinson, E.; Smith, E. (1841). Biblical Researches in Palestine, Mount Sinai and Arabia Petraea: A Journal of Travels in the year 1838. Vol. 3. Boston: Crocker & Brewster.
