= Kafr Qaddum =

- Municipality type D (Village council)

Arabic transcription(s)
  - Arabic: كفر قدوم
  - Latin: Kafar Qaddum, Kefr Kaddum (official); Kafr Kadum (unofficial)
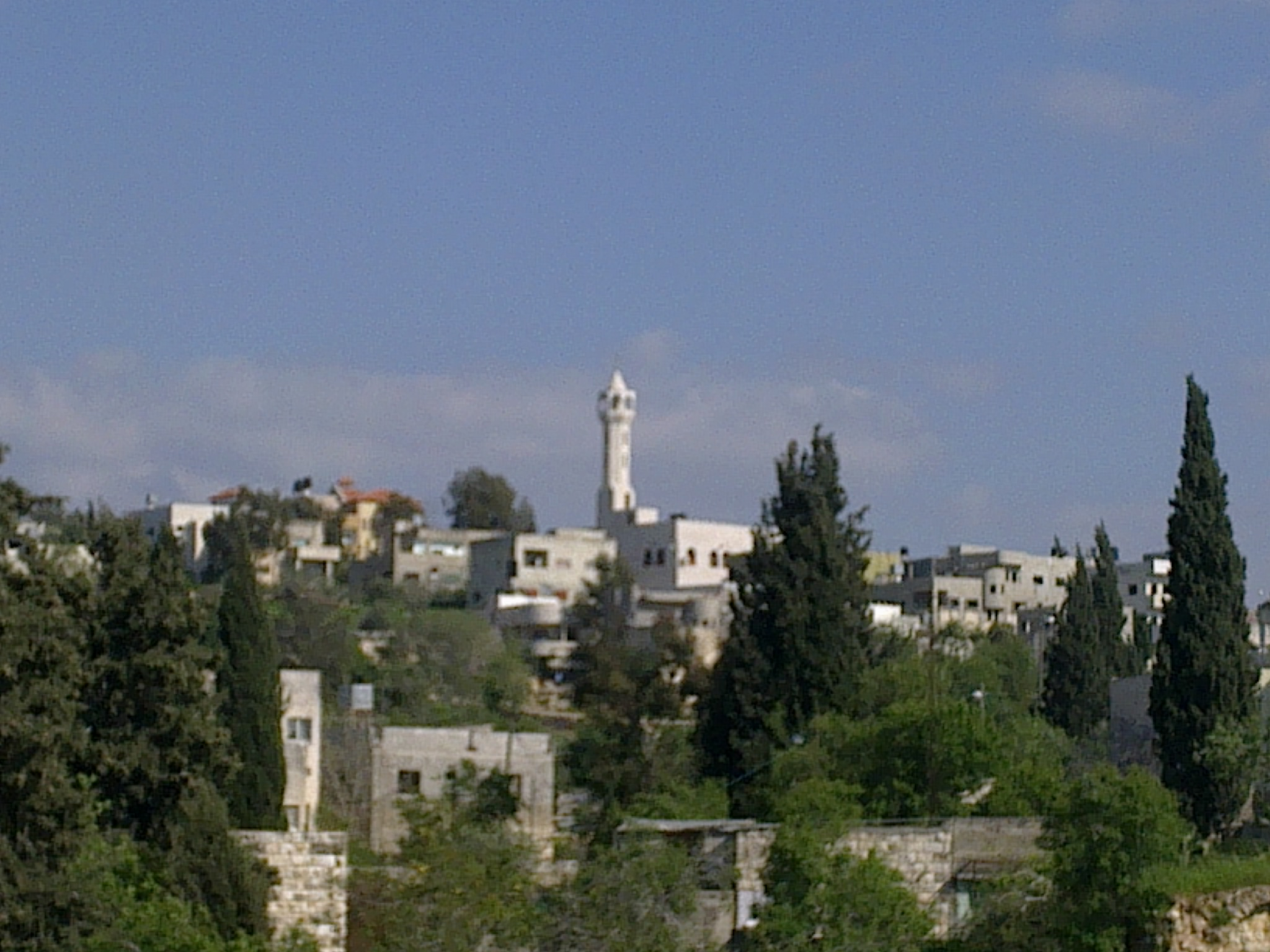
- General view of Kafr Qaddum

- Location of Kafr Qaddum within Palestine
- Coordinates: 32°13′18″N 35°08′34″E
- Palestine grid: 163/180
- State: State of Palestine
- Governorate: Qalqilya

Government
  - Type: Village council

Area
  - Total: 18.9 km^{2} (7.3 sq mi)

Population (2017)
  - Total: 3,280
  - Density: 174/km^{2} (449/sq mi)
- Name meaning: "The village of Kaddum"

Kafr Qaddum (Arabic: كفر قدّوم) is a Palestinian town in the northern West Bank, located 13 kilometers west of Nablus and 17 kilometers east of Qalqilya in the Qalqilya Governorate. Surrounding towns include Jit to the east and Hajjah to the south. According to the Palestinian Central Bureau of Statistics (PCBS), the town had a population of 3,280 inhabitants in 2017.

Kafr Qaddum's territory covers 19,000 dunams (about 8,000 under Palestinian civil administration and 11,000 under complete Israeli control). Its built-up area consists of 529 dunams. Olive groves make up 80% of the remaining land, 15% is used for vegetation purposes, and 5% are planted crops. Israel has expropriated roughly 2,500 dunams (618 acres) for the use of settlements nearby.

Since 2011, residents have regularly protested the Israeli blockade of their village, and through to 2020, 100 members of the community, including 6 minors, have been shot and wounded by Israeli troops. 170 villagers have been arrested by the IDF and constrained by military courts to pay fines collectively amounting to US$74,200.

== Location ==
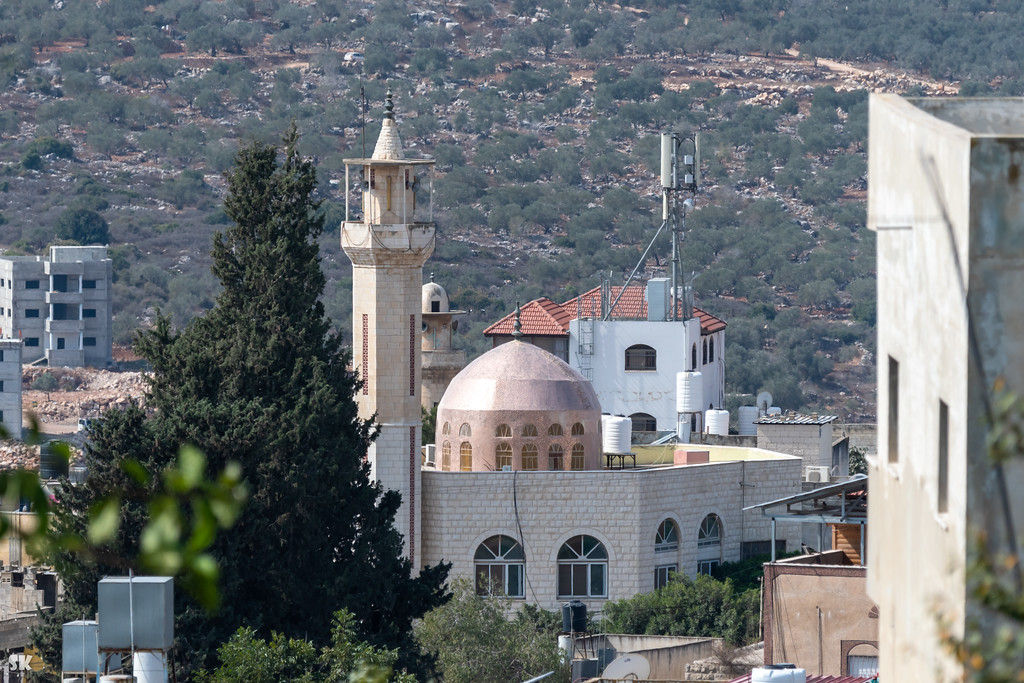
Mosque in Kafr Qaddum

Kafr Qaddum is located 17.32 km north-east of Qalqiliya. It is bordered by Jit village to the east, Immatain to the south, Kur and Hajja village to the west, and Beit Lid, Qusin and Deir Sharaf to the north.

== History ==
=== Ancient period ===
According to archaeological evidence, Kafr Qaddum has been inhabited since the Early Bronze Age. On the hill south of the village is the archeological site of Khirbet 'Asafeh, where an 1979 archaeological excavation unearthed remains from the Bronze Age, Iron Age, Persian, Hellenistics, and Roman (structures and a kokhim-style tomb) periods.

In the second century CE, a large Samaritan settlement was built on the site with stone-built dwellings. Its inhabitants grew olives for oil, as attested by three olive presses discovered near the village. A destruction layer found in a number of buildings from the end of the fifth century is probably related to the Samaritan revolts.

Samaritan sources record a number of neighboring ruins recorded as inhabited by Samaritans. According to Samaritan Historian Benyamim Tsedaka, a Samaritan village called Kiriat 'Asfeh was home to the Surek and Naakon clans. The Tolidah further records the original name of 'Asfeh as Qiryat ʿUplata (קרית עפלתה).

The Tolidah also records the Samaritan settlement from 'Asfeh in nearby Beit Bizzin, including Yūsif b. Barkahuta, born in ʿAsāfah, a son of Muwannis b. Radap b. Rabīʿ. It also mention Rabbi Iṣḥāq son of Khalaf of the Bene Matar clan. The latter moved there from Kafar Qalil and, after forty years, built a stone railings for the Kafr Qalil's synagogue, where his name was inscribed. According to Palestinian sources, some Samaritan inhabitants later converted to Islam, moved to nearby Kafr Qaddum, and subsequently spread to other villages.

While Kafr Qaddum is not mentioned in the Tolidah, Two menorah reliefs were also found there.

The settlement continued to prosper until the early Islamic period, and it seems that its Samaritan residents were forced to convert to Islam, and in part the settlement has survived continuously since.

=== Ottoman era ===
Kafr Qaddum appeared in 1596 Ottoman tax registers as being in the Nahiya of Jabal Qubal of the Liwa of Nablus. It had a population of 19 households and 2 bachelors, all Muslim. The villagers paid taxes on wheat, barley, summer crops, olives, and goats or beehives, and a press for olives or grapes; a total of 4,700 Akçe.

During the 17th century, the Ottoman settlement of exiled Transjordanian groups in Jabal Nablus disrupted the local balance of power. The arrival of the Qmeiri clan in Kafr Qaddum led to a prolonged conflict with the native Shteiwi clan, resulting in the dispersion of local residents in dozens of villages in the surrounding countryside.

In 1838, Kefr Kaddum was noted as a village located in the District of Jurat 'Amra, south of Nablus.

In 1852, it was by noted Biblical scholar Edward Robinson on his travels in the region,

In 1870/1871 (1288 AH), an Ottoman census listed the village with a large population of 198 households in the nahiya (sub-district) of Jamma'in al-Awwal, subordinate to Nablus and in 1882 the PEF's Survey of Western Palestine (SWP) the village (called Kefr Kaddum) was described as "A good-sized village on low ground, with wells and olives; it has a watch-tower on the side of the chalk hill rising over it on the east, and is supplied by wells; the houses are of stone."

=== British Mandate period ===
In a 1922 census of Palestine conducted by the British Mandate authorities, Kufr Qaddum had a population of 874 inhabitants, all Muslims, increasing in the 1931 census to 963, again all Muslim, in 234 houses.

In the 1945 statistics the population was 1,240, all Muslims, with 18,931 dunams of land, according to an official land and population survey. Of this, 2,945 dunams were for plantations or irrigated land, 7,184 for cereals, while 69 dunams were built-up (urban) land.

=== Jordanian era ===
In the wake of the 1948 Arab–Israeli War, and after the 1949 Armistice Agreements, Kafr Qaddum came under Jordanian rule.

The Jordanian census of 1961 found 1,701 inhabitants.

=== 1967–present ===
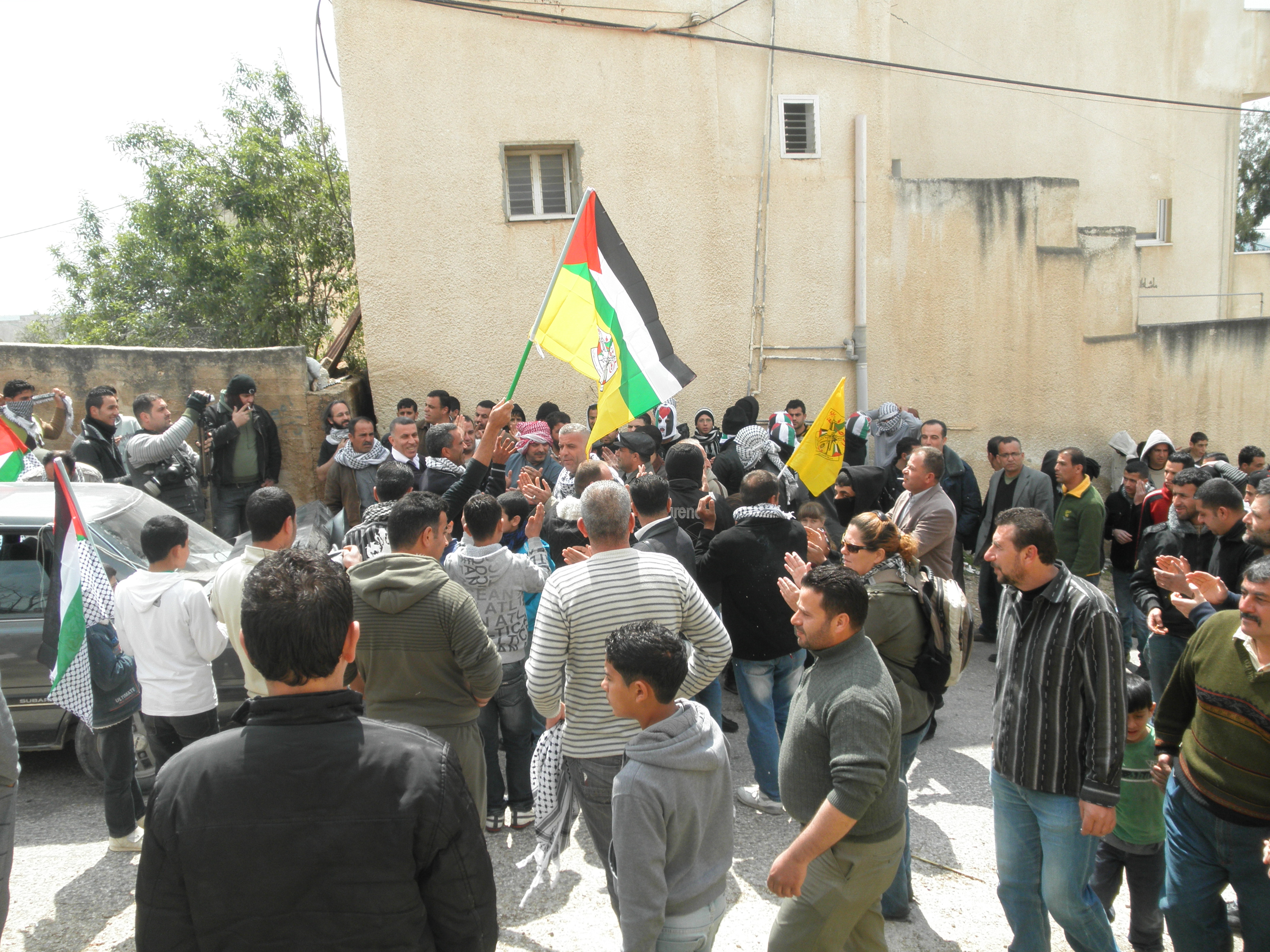
Demonstration against road block, Kafr Qaddum, March 2012

Since the Six-Day War in 1967, Kafr Qaddum has been under Israeli occupation.

After the 1995 accords, 44.6% of village land was classified as Area B, while the remaining 55.4% was classified as Area C. Up until 2013 Israel had confiscated 2,031 dunums of village land for the Israeli settlements of Kedumim Zefon, Jit (Mitzpe Yishai), and Giv'at HaMerkaziz; presently all part of Kedumim.

Since 2003, the road between Kafr Qaddum and Nablus is blocked thus elongating the travel distance by 14 km. Since July 2011, weekly demonstrations have been held in a demand to re-open the road.

==== Land issues ====
In the Mitzpe Yishai neighborhood of Kedumim, the there Israeli Civil Administration accused Israelis of stealing private Palestinian land, though it occurred in an "orderly manner" without any official authorization.

==== Main entrance ====
In 2003, the Israeli military closed the main entrance of the village that connects it to Nablus with a permanent roadblock, in addition, a dirt mound was put one kilometer before the roadblock, isolating one family house which made it unreachable by vehicles. In 2010, after waiting for five years for an Israeli court decision, it was ruled that the roadblock is illegal, but the court also stated that the road is "too dangerous to travel" so the road remained blocked.

Protest march in Kafr Qaddum against road block, August 2022

The roadblock makes it difficult for people to reach their farmlands because they are prohibited from driving, so they must walk on foot and carry their equipment and harvest. It also delays the fifteen minute journey to Nablus to forty minutes.

==== Events ====
- In 2012, an Israeli soldier was under investigation for the theft of a large sum of money and gold from during a raid against a resident of Kafr Qaddum.
- On 2 January 2014, 85-year-old Saeed Jaser Alim became the "first Palestinian casualty of conflict with Israel in 2014; he died following a clash with Israeli soldiers at Kafr Qaddum near Nablus". Villagers say Israeli soldiers fired teargas canisters at them, one of which entered his home, and he subsequently died.
- In January 2014, a large force of Israeli soldiers entered the village in the middle of the night, seeking "two wanted men", who turned out to be two boys, aged 11 and 13. As they were leaving, they threw stun grenades into the yards of the homes they passed.
- In December 2014, Bashar Saleh was shot in the leg while standing with his camera in a group of journalists.
- In October 2015 Ahmed Tala’at, a photographer, was shot in the backside while standing with a group of journalists, armed only with his cameras and a gasmask.
- Muayyed Shteiwi, a nurse, who brandishes a Palestinian flag at demonstrations, was shot near the groin and in the back when, hearing noises of confrontation, he left the yard of a mosque to observe what was happening.
- In March 2016 an Israeli border policeman shot Khaled Shteiwi/Shatawi (11) in the leg. When an adult villager came to assist him, he too was shot by another soldier.
- On 12 July 2019, Abd el-Rahman Shatawi, aged 9, was shot in the head with a live bullet by an Israeli sniper posted 100 metres away while watching a demonstration that was taking place 200 metres from his friend's home. He has since used a wheelchair.
- 30 January 2020 No demonstrations took place that day when Mohammed Shteiwi/Shatawi (14), hiding in a grove when soldiers arrived, took a head shot from a soldier firing a plastic-coated metal bullet at close range. He had peeked out to check out what was going on, and now lies in a vegetative state.
- In August 2020, Israeli placed three boxes containing explosive devices in the village. One of them was found by a child and lightly injured an adult when he shook it. An army source said that the boxes were placed "for deterrence".

== Economy ==
Prior to the Second Intifada, about 50% of the Kafr Qaddum's economy depended on work in Israel as the primary source of income, 20% depended on agriculture and animal raising, while 30% depended on jobs in private and public sectors. After 2002, over 75% of the population became jobless as business became the only other alternative for income generation. Emigration has registered a record level during the past two years, ranging between 10-15% of the total population.

== Maqam al-Khalil ==
In the old core of the village, located in its western part near the ancient mosque, stands a sacred structure named Maqam al-Khalil. Inside this site is a cave that leads further down to a lower cave below. The structure also features a raised platform. According to local tradition, this place is believed to be the very place where the prophet Abraham circumcised himself. It is said that the name of the village itself, Qaddum, derives from the Arabic word for "axe" - referring to the tool used for Abraham's circumcision at this spot.

== Demography ==
The inhabitants of Kafr Qaddum belong to various families, such as the Shteiwi, Jum'a, 'Obeid, Barham, Ali and 'Amer families.

People with origins in Kafr Qaddum have established or settled in communities in various locations, including Jab'a, Tammun, Iksal, Immatain, Kafr Zibad, Rafiddiya, 'Attil, and Nablus.

== Bibliography ==
- Barron, J. B., ed. (1923). Palestine: Report and General Abstracts of the Census of 1922. Government of Palestine.
- Conder, C.R.; Kitchener, H.H. (1882). The Survey of Western Palestine: Memoirs of the Topography, Orography, Hydrography, and Archaeology. Vol. 2. London: Committee of the Palestine Exploration Fund.
- Government of Jordan, Department of Statistics (1964). First Census of Population and Housing. Volume I: Final Tables; General Characteristics of the Population (PDF).
- Government of Palestine, Department of Statistics (1945). Village Statistics, April, 1945.
- Hadawi, S. (1970). Village Statistics of 1945: A Classification of Land and Area ownership in Palestine. Palestine Liberation Organization Research Center.
- Hütteroth, W.-D.; Abdulfattah, K. (1977). Historical Geography of Palestine, Transjordan and Southern Syria in the Late 16th Century. Erlanger Geographische Arbeiten, Sonderband 5. Erlangen, Germany: Vorstand der Fränkischen Geographischen Gesellschaft. ISBN 3-920405-41-2.
- Mills, E., ed. (1932). Census of Palestine 1931. Population of Villages, Towns and Administrative Areas. Jerusalem: Government of Palestine.
- Palmer, E.H. (1881). The Survey of Western Palestine: Arabic and English Name Lists Collected During the Survey by Lieutenants Conder and Kitchener, R. E. Transliterated and Explained by E.H. Palmer. Committee of the Palestine Exploration Fund.
- Robinson, E.; Smith, E. (1841). Biblical Researches in Palestine, Mount Sinai and Arabia Petraea: A Journal of Travels in the year 1838. Vol. 3. Boston: Crocker & Brewster.
- Robinson, E.; Smith, E. (1856). Later Biblical Researches in Palestine and adjacent regions: A Journal of Travels in the year 1852. London: John Murray.
