= Qalqiliya Governorate =

Governorate of Palestine

Coordinates: 32°11′9″N 35°3′57″E

- Governorate
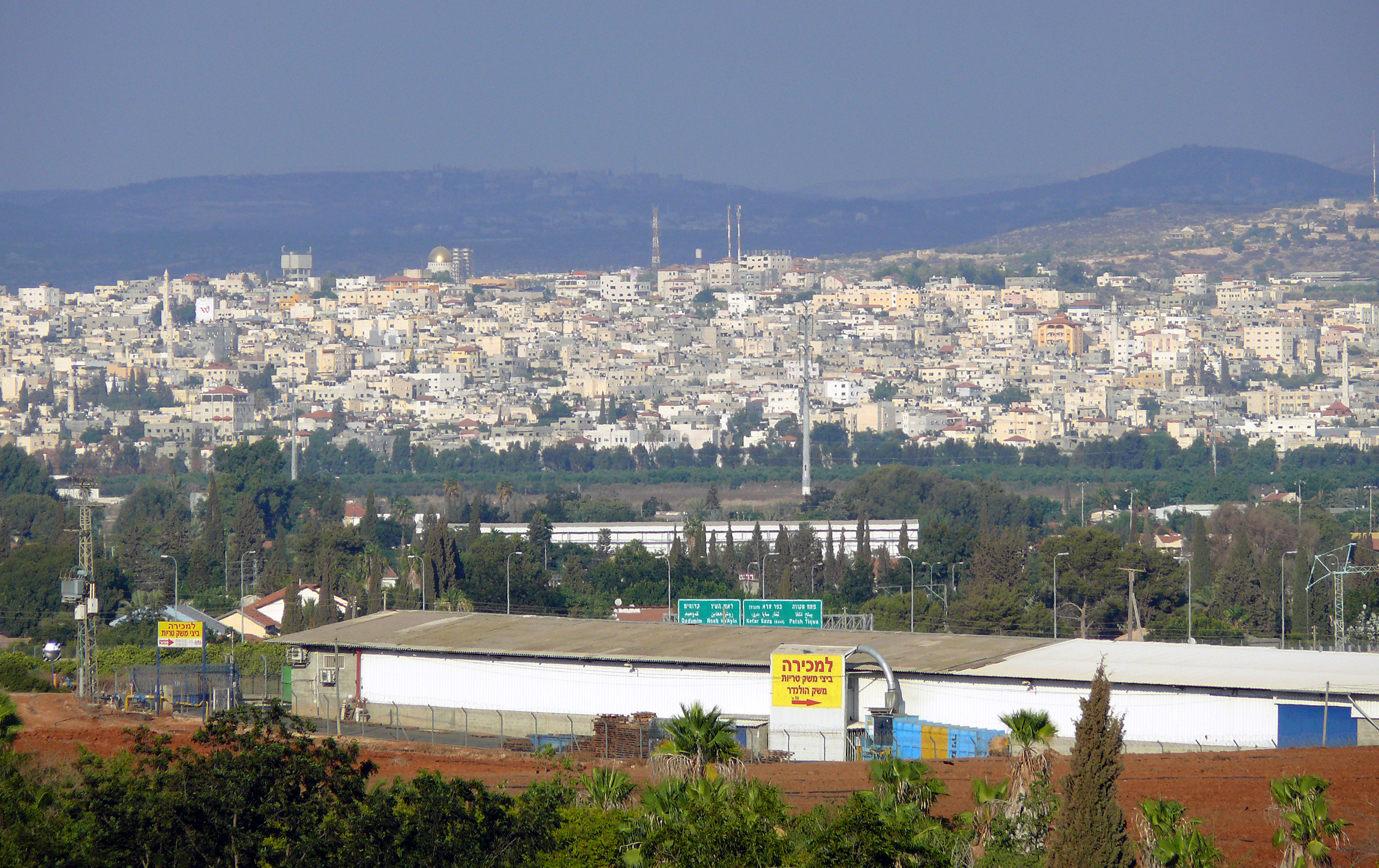

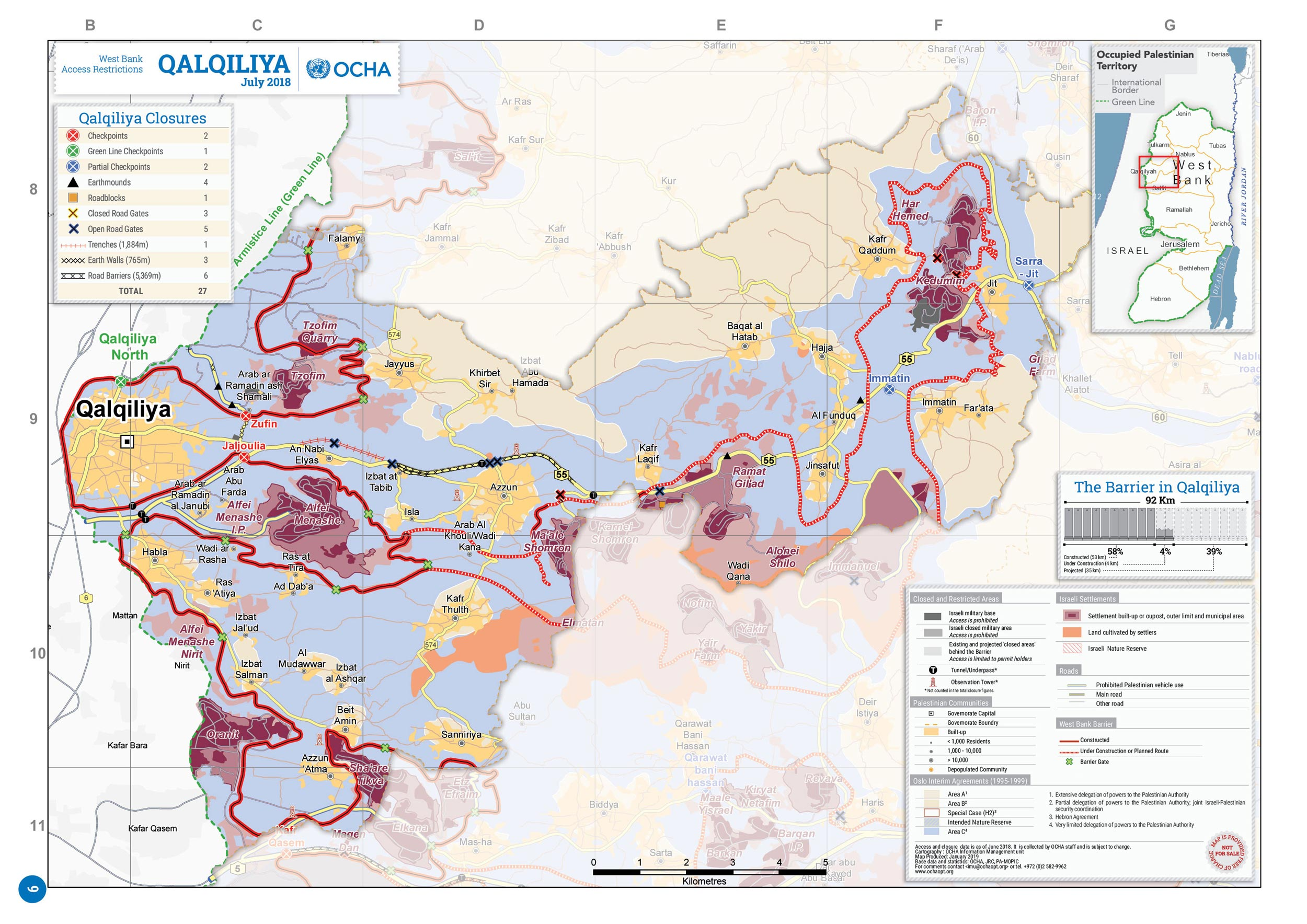
- 2018 United Nations map of the area, showing the Israeli occupation arrangements in the governorate
- Interactive map of Qalqiliya Governorate
- Country: Palestine

Area
  - Total: 164 km^{2} (63 sq mi)

Population (2017)
  - Total: 91,046
- This figure excludes the Israeli West Bank Settlements

The Qalqiliya Governorate or Qalqilya Governorate (Arabic: محافظة قلقيلية, romanized: Muḥāfaẓat Qalqīlya) is an administrative area of Palestine in the northwestern West Bank. Its capital or muhfaza (seat) is the city of Qalqilya that borders the Green Line.

== History ==
During the Ottoman period, the region later forming the Qalqiliya Governorate belonged to Jabal Nablus. Like other regionls of Nablus' peripheral hinterland, it followed the provincial center, led by a closely knit web of economic, social and political relations between Nablus' urban notables and the city's surroundings. With the help of rural trading partners, these urban notables established trading monopolies that transformed Jabal Nablus' autarkic economy into an export-driven market, shipping vast quantities of cash crops and finished goods to off-shore markets. Increasing demand for these commodities in the Ottoman Empire's urban centers and in Europe spurred demographic growth and settlement expansion in the lowlands surrounding Jabal Nablus.

== Localities ==
=== Municipalities ===
- Azzun
- Hableh
- Qalqilya
- Kafr Thulth

=== Towns and villages ===
- Azzun 'Atma
- Baqat al-Hatab
- Beit Amin
- Hajjah
- Immatain
- Jayyous
- Jinsafut
- Jit
- Kafr Laqif
- Kafr Qaddum
- an Nabi Elyas
- Ras Atiya
- Sanniriya
- Fara'ata
