= Tolidah =

Oldest Samaritan historical work

The Tolidah or Tulida (Samaritan Hebrew: תולידה, romanized: Tūlīdā, lit. 'Genealogy') is a Samaritan chronicle that is considered the oldest Samaritan historical work. Written mainly in Samaritan Hebrew, with sections in hybrid Samaritan Hebrew and Samaritan Aramaic, the book provides a concise summary of Samaritan history and the dynasty of Samaritan High Priests up to the Middle Ages.

The Tulida reached its final form in a manuscript copied by Jacob ben Harun in 1859 (1276 AH) with a parallel Arabic translation. Its full title is Ha-Tolida ʿasher mitʿakeh ben ha-Shemarim, which translates to "The Book of Genealogies that the Samaritans have transcribed". Owing to its first publisher, it is sometimes known as the Chronicle Neubauer.

== Manuscript and publication history ==
After 1400, the Tolidah developed within a Samaritan community undergoing severe demographic and geographical contraction. The last rural Samaritan settlements around Nablus disappeared during the fifteenth century, while the Ottoman period brought the extinction of the priestly caste, The population was reduced to only 123 people after the First World War. Yet this decline did not ended literary production. The earliest surviving Tolidah manuscript date from the mid-sixteenth century, and later scribes continued to extend, revise, and annotate the text. Thus, During the nineteenth and early twentieth centuries, Western scholarly and tourist demand stimulated the production of numerous new copies, sometimes in modern Hebrew script or with typewritten additions, making the later textual tradition especially diverse and internally variable.

The history of the Tolidah itself is based primarily on information in the manuscript of 1859. It is partially corroborated by the composite nature of the text, which suggests that parts were written at different times. The oldest section of the Tolidah was originally compiled in 1149 AD (554 AH) by Eleazar ben ׳Amram of Nablus. This chronicle was continued by Jacob ben Ishmael in 1346 AD (747 AH). Other scribes continued the work down to 1859.

The Tolidah was brought to the attention of western scholarship by Adolf Neubauer, who purchased the manuscript of Jacob ben Harun, now MS or. 651 in the Bodleian Library, and published it in 1869. His edition was based on MS or. 651 and on a manuscript copied in 1797 AD (1212 AH) by Shlomo ben Ṭobiah, which he could not buy but was able to view for a few hours in Nablus.

In 1870, Moritz Heidenheim, apparently unaware of Neubauer's publication of the year before, published his own edition of the Tolidah. In 1954, John Bowman, claiming to have seen a manuscript with "the appearance of antiquity" that he believed to be the original Tolidah, published a new edition. He did not give a date or name the scribe of the manuscript. In 1977, he published an English translation of the "original" part of the chronicle. The latest critical edition, based on the more manuscripts than all previous and including an English translation and commentary, is that of Moshe Florentin, published in 1999.

== Contents ==
The first part of the Tolidah, written in Aramaic, is a discussion of the meridian that passes through Mount Gerizim.

The genealogies of the patriarchs from Adam to Moses are given, and that of Aaron down to Uzzi. It lists the High Priests of Israel (that is, mainly the Samaritan High Priests) from the destruction of the tabernacle at Shiloh down to the time of the original author, Eleazar ben ׳Amram.

The most prominent Samaritan families are listed. Brief references to the wider world exist to place these families in their context. Although the chronicle was compiled in the Crusader Kingdom of Jerusalem, it does not mention the Crusaders. It does mention the Seljuk conquest of Ramla in 1070/71 AD (463 AH), and provides evidence for Samaritan communities in Gaza and Acre in the 12th century AD.

The continuation of 1346 provides a list of jubilees from the Israelite conquest of Canaan down to the compiler's own time. The continuation mentions the devastation wrought on the Samaritan community at Nablus by a major raid in the mid-13th century AD. This was not the Knights Templar raid of 1242 during the Seventh Crusade, which devastated the Muslim inhabitants. Neubauer believed it to be the Khwarazmian raid that conquered Jerusalem in 1244, but it was more likely the Mongol raid of 1260.

== Extensions ==
Hashlamūt—singular hashlama—are continuations or "completions" appended to the Tolidah. Unlike marginalia, the hashlamūt are cumulative, non-canonical, and often contradictory, since different scribes adapted the same events according to their own priestly, lay, familial, or patronal perspectives. The nineteenth- and twentieth-century examples examined By Marom recount synagogue reconstruction, charity, education, earthquakes, and priestly succession, while revealing competition over authority, demographic anxiety, and changing relations between sacred leadership and wealthy lay patrons. Therefore, the scholar claims that the hashlamut preserved also the self-understandings of scribes who interpreted the community’s present through its inherited historical tradition.

== Editions ==
- Neubauer, Adolf (1869). "Chronique Samaritaine, suivie d'un appendice contenant de notices sur quelques autres ouvrages samaritains". Journal Asiatique. 14: 385–470.
- Heidenheim, Moritz (1870). "Die samaritanische Chronik des Hohenpriesters Elasar aus dem 11. Jahrhundert übersetzt und erklärt". Deutsche Vierteljahrsschrift für englische theologische Forschung. 4: 347–89.
- Bowman, John (1954). Transcript of the Original Text of the Samaritan Chronicle Tolidah. Leeds: Leeds University Oriental Society.
- Bowman, John (1977). Samaritan Documents Relating to their History, Religion and Life: Translated and Edited by John Bowman. Pittsburgh: Pickwick. Cf. pp. 37–61.
- Florentin, Moshe (1999). The Tulida: A Samaritan Chronicle: Text, Translation Commentary. Jerusalem: Yitzhak Ben Zvi.

== See also ==
- Samaritan Chronicle
- Chronicles of Jerahmeel
- The Asatir
