= Battle of Tabsor =

1918 World War I battle

- Part of the Middle Eastern theatre of World War I
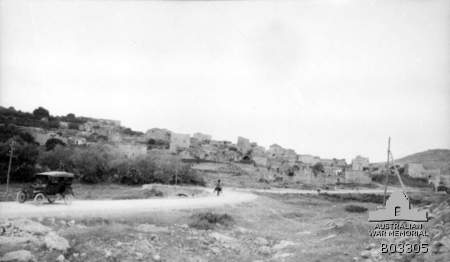
- Anebta on the Tulkarm to Nablus road
Date	19–20 September 1918
Location	Tabsor trench system stretching east to west of Tabsor village; to Et Tire 32°11′36″N 34°52′38″E
Result	Entente victory

Belligerents
British Empire: India; United Kingdom	Ottoman Empire; German Empire

Commanders and leaders
(United Kingdom of Great Britain and Ireland) Edmund Allenby; (British Empire) Edward Bulfin	(Ottoman Empire) Fevsi Pasha; (German Empire) Otto Liman von Sanders; (Ottoman Empire) Jevad Pasha; (German Empire) Gustav von Oppen

Units involved
Egyptian Expeditionary Force XXI Corps': 3rd (Lahore) Division; 7th (Meerut) Division; 75th Division	Yildirim Army Group: Eighth Army; Ottoman XXII Corps; Asia Corps

The Battle of Tabsor was fought on 19–20 September 1918 beginning the Battle of Sharon, which along with the Battle of Nablus formed the set piece Battle of Megiddo fought between 19 and 25 September in the last months of the Sinai and Palestine Campaign of the First World War. During the infantry phase of the Battle of Sharon the British Empire 60th Division, XXI Corps attacked and captured the section of the front line nearest the Mediterranean coast under cover of an intense artillery barrage including a creeping barrage and naval gunfire. This Egyptian Expeditionary Force (EEF) victory over the entrenched Ottoman Eighth Army, composed of German and Ottoman soldiers, began the Final Offensive, ultimately resulting in the destruction of the equivalent of one Ottoman army, the retreat of what remained of two others, and the capture of many thousands of prisoners and many miles of territory from the Judean Hills to the border of modern-day Turkey. After the end of the battle of Megiddo, the Desert Mounted Corps pursued the retreating soldiers to Damascus, six days later. By the time the Armistice of Mudros was signed between the Allies and the Ottoman Empire five weeks later, Aleppo had been captured.

During the Battle of Tabsor the 3rd (Lahore), 7th (Meerut) and 75th Divisions attacked the entrenched Ottoman Empire Eighth Army defending the Tabsor defences. These defences were located in the middle section of the front line, assigned to the XXI Corps. On their left the Battle of Tulkarm was being fought with the Battle of Arara fought on their right. Together with the cavalry phase, these battles make up the Battle of Sharon, which, with the Battle of Nablus, fought by the XX Corps and Chaytor's Force, have become known as the Battle of Megiddo. Megiddo developed into a major set piece offensive, when large formations of the Allied EEF, attacked and responded to the reactions of three Ottoman armies, each time following a predetermined plan. The offensive resulted in defeat for Ottoman forces in Palestine, Syria and the Transjordan.

These operations began the Final Offensive, ultimately resulting in the destruction of the equivalent of an Ottoman army and the retreat in disarray of what remained of two armies. The defeat of the Yildirim Army Group, commanded by Otto Liman von Sanders, resulted in the capture of many thousands of prisoners and many miles of territory stretching from the Judean Hills. After the battle of Megiddo, Desert Mounted Corps pursued the retreating German and Ottoman soldiers to Damascus, which was captured six days later, when the pursuit continued on to close to the border of modern-day Turkey. Five weeks after the Final Offensive began and with Aleppo captured, the Armistice of Mudros was signed between the Allies and the Ottoman Empire ending the fighting in this theatre.

The Battle of Tabsor began with an intense creeping bombardment, during which three infantry divisions of the XXI Corps attacked the Tabsor defences; the only continuous trench-and-redoubt system on the Ottoman front line. As they advanced, their left flank was protected by the 60th Division, which advanced up the coast to Nahr el Faliq, before capturing Tulkarm, the headquarters of the Eighth Army. Their right flank was secured by the 54th (East Anglian) Division, with the Détachement Français de Palestine et de Syrie pivoting on the Rafat salient. Defending the Ottoman front line against the attacks by the 3rd (Lahore), 7th (Meerut) and 75th Divisions were four divisions of the Ottoman Eighth Army: the 7th, 20th and 46th Infantry Divisions of the Ottoman XXII Corps and the 19th Division of the German Asia Corps. By the end of the first day of battle, the Ottoman 7th Division had ceased to exist and the Ottoman front line (which had previously stretched east-west from the coast) had been pushed and bent back to run north-south. The Seventh Army, further inland, was forced to withdraw when the Eighth Army was outflanked, to conform with the new Ottoman front line.

== Background ==
By July, it was clear that the German Spring Offensive in France, which had forced the postponement of offensive plans in Palestine, had failed, resulting in a return to trench warfare on the Western Front. This coincided with the approach of the campaign season in Palestine and the Middle East. General Edmund Allenby, commander of the Egyptian Expeditionary Force (EEF), was "very anxious to make a move in September", when he expected to capture the Ottoman Seventh and Eighth Army headquarters at Tulkarm and Nablus, the road to Jisr ed Damieh and Es Salt in the hills east of the Jordan River. "Another reason for moving to this line is that it will encourage both my own new Indian troops and my Arab Allies."

=== Reorganisation of EEF infantry ===
After the 52nd (Lowland), the 74th (Yeomanry) Divisions and nine British infantry battalions from each of the 10th, 53rd, 60th and 75th Divisions were sent to France between May and August 1918, the remaining British infantry battalions were reinforced by British Indian Army battalions. (Note: The 75th Division was formed from British Territorial and Indian battalions. [Falls 1930 Vol. 1 p. 319] The 75th Division had received the first Indian battalions in June 1917. ["75th Division". The Long Long Trail. Retrieved 30 August 2012.]) Infantry brigades were now reorganised with one British battalion and three British Indian Army battalions, with the exception of one brigade in the 53rd Division which had one South African and three Indian battalions. The British Indian Army's 7th (Meerut) Division arrived from the campaign in Mesopotamia in January 1918, followed by the 3rd (Lahore) Division in April 1918. (Note: Allenby had been informed after the capture of Jerusalem in December 1917 that "the 7th Indian Division would arrive from Mesopotamia" and on 1 April it relieved the 52nd Division which sailed for France, the "3rd Indian Division" arrived from Mesopotamia on 14 April 1918. [Falls 1930 Vol. 2 pp. 293, 350, 413]) Only the 54th (East Anglian) Division remained, as previously, an all British division.

By April 1918, 35 infantry and two pioneer battalions were being prepared to move to Palestine. Those battalions with identification numbers from 150 upwards were formed by removing complete companies from experienced regiments then serving in Mesopotamia and forming new battalions. The 2/151st Indian Infantry was one such battalion formed from one company each from the 56th Punjabi Rifles and the 51st, 52nd and 53rd Sikhs. One regiment, the 101st Grenadiers, formed a second battalion by dividing itself into two with two experienced and two new companies in each battalion. The parent battalions also supplied first line transport and experienced officers with war time service. The 3/151st Indian Infantry had the commanding officer, two other British and four Indian officers included in the 198 men transferred from the 38th Dogras. The sepoys transferred were also very experienced. In September 1918 the 2/151st Indian Infantry had to provide an honour guard for Allenby; among the men on parade were some who had served on five different fronts since 1914, and on eight pre-war campaigns.

Of the 54 Indian battalions deployed to Palestine, 22 had recent experience of combat, but had each lost an experienced company, which had been replaced by recruits. Ten battalions were formed from experienced troops who had never fought or trained together. The other 22 had not seen any prior service in the war; in total, almost a third of the troops were recruits. Within 44 Indian battalions, the "junior British officers were green, and most could not speak Hindustani. In one battalion only one Indian officer spoke English and only two British officers could communicate with their men." Not all of the Indian battalions served in the infantry divisions, some were employed in defence of the lines of communication.

=== Front line ===
By September 1918 the front line held by the EEF began virtually at sea level at a point on the Mediterranean coast about 12 miles (19 km) north of Jaffa, just north of Arsuf, ran about 15 miles (24 km) south-east across the Plain of Sharon, then east over the Judean Hills for about 15 miles (24 km), rising to a height of 1,500–2,000 feet (460–610 m) above sea level. From the Judean Hills the front line fell steeply to 1,000 feet (300 m) below sea level in the Jordan Valley, where it continued for about 18 miles (29 km) to the Dead Sea and the foothills of the Mountains of Gilead/Moab.

== Prelude ==
=== British plans and preparations ===
On the first quarter of the front line, which stretched 15 miles (24 km) across the Plain of Sharon from the Mediterranean Sea, the XXI Corps deployed 35,000 infantry, the Desert Mounted Corps 9,000 cavalry and the artillery's 383 guns for their attacks on the Eighth Army. On the remaining three quarters of front line, ending at the Dead Sea, 22,000 infantry, 3,000 cavalry and 157 guns of the XX Corps and Chaytor's Force were deployed facing the Ottoman Seventh and Fourth Armies.

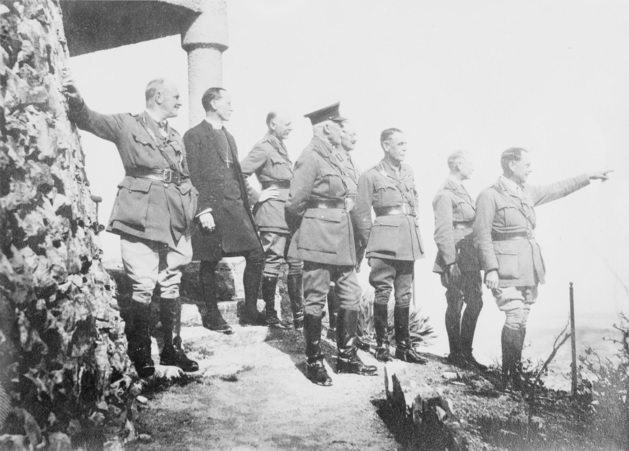
Bulfin, third from right, with other generals on the Mount of Olives, Jerusalem, 19 March 1918

The Battle of Sharon was to begin with an attack on an 8-mile (13 km)-long stretch of front line between the Jaffa-Jerusalem railway running north from Lydda towards Tulkarm (cut at the front line) and the Mediterranean, where Allenby massed three mounted divisions behind three of the XXI Corps' infantry divisions supported by 18 densely deployed heavy and siege batteries. Together the five infantry divisions of the XXI Corps, commanded by the British Lieutenant General Sir Edward Bulfin, had an advantage of 4.4–to–1 in total numbers, and three times the defenders' heavy artillery. "Concentration, surprise and speed were key elements in the blitzkrieg warfare planned by Allenby."

The four infantry divisions of the XXI Corps were to begin the Battle of Sharon by attacking in overwhelming strength, supported by the greatest possible weight of artillery. The first objective of breaking the German and Ottoman front line was assigned to the 60th Division. They were to create a gap sufficiently large to enable the cavalry to safely advance to the rear of the German and Ottoman forces in the Judean Hills. The second objective of assaulting the Tabsor defences was assigned to the 3rd (Lahore), 7th (Meerut) and 75th Divisions. After their successful initial attack, they were to attack the Jiljulieh- Kalkilieh-Et Tire line.

After the cavalry breakthrough on the coast, the XXI Corps would advance to capture the headquarters of the Ottoman Eighth Army at Tulkarm and cut the railway lines. Sections of the lateral rail line in the Judean Hills between Tulkarm and Nablus and a branch of the Jezreel Valley railway, were to be denied to the Seventh and Eighth Ottoman Armies. These lines, including the important railway junction at Messudieh, transported their supplies into the Judean Hills. The British infantry divisions were to continue their attack by swinging north–east, pivoting on their right to push the defenders back out of their trenches away from the coast and back into the Judean Hills towards Messudieh.

While the brigades of the XXI Corps' 3rd (Lahore), the 7th (Meerut) and the 75th Divisions attacked the Tabsor defences, the 54th (East Anglian) Division and the Détachement Français de Palestine et de Syrie defended and pivoted on the Rafat salient covering the right flank. Further to the right, the XX Corps would begin the Battle of Nablus in the Judean Hills in support of the main attack by the XXI Corps, by advancing to capture the Seventh Army headquarters at Nablus and blocking the main escape route from the Judean Hills to the Jisr ed Damieh. (Note: See the Battle of Nablus (1918) for a detailed description of this corps' and Chaytor's Force' operations in the eastern Judean Hills at the Jordan River fords from Jisr ed Damieh south, and then east to Es Salt and Amman.)

Together, these attacks would force the Central Powers to retreat back along their main line of communication on the roads and branch lines to the Jezreel Valley railway. These ran alongside each other out of the Judean Hills, through the Dothan Pass to Jenin, and across the Esdrealon Plain (also known as the Jezreel Valley and the ancient Plain of Armageddon), 40 miles (64 km) away, and on to Damascus. The plain was also the site of the important communication hubs at Afulah and Beisan and here thousands would be captured by the cavalry as they successfully exploited the infantry victories. The objectives of Desert Mounted Corps were the swift capture of Afulah by the 4th Cavalry Division, the swift capture the Yildirim Army Group's headquarters at Nazareth by the 5th Cavalry Division and the swift capture of Jenin by the Australian Mounted Division's 3rd Light Horse Brigade. Together, the occupation of the lowlands of the Plain of Sharon, the Esdrealon Plain and the southern Jordan Valley would form a semicircle round the positions of the Ottoman Seventh and Eighth Armies in the Judean Hills.

=== British Empire deployments ===
The actual frontage which would be directly attacked by the British Empire infantry was about 10 miles (16 km) long, but it was not continuous. There were about 5 miles (8.0 km) of gaps in their deployment, where the terrain was unfavourable for a frontal attack. During the advance, a planned right-flanking movement by all the infantry divisions aimed to bring them in touch with one another. At this point in their advance, Ottoman units in those areas unfavourable for frontal attack would be forced to withdraw by the threatening encirclement, be outflanked or be captured from the rear.

The final deployment, which was made during 35 minutes of darkness between moon-set and dawn, placed the divisions at right angles to the direction of their advance. The XXI Corps' 60th Division was deployed closest to the coast with the 7th (Meerut) Division on their right and then the 75th Division with the longest frontage, followed by the 3rd (Lahore) Division, the 54th (East Anglian) Division and finally the Détachement Français de Palestine et de Syrie at Rafat, at the eastern end of the XXI Corps front line in the foothills of the Judean Hills. There was no corps reserve. (Note: Mention is made of four British infantry brigades being in reserve. [Erickson 2007 pp. 146 & 148])

=== German and Ottoman forces and preparations ===
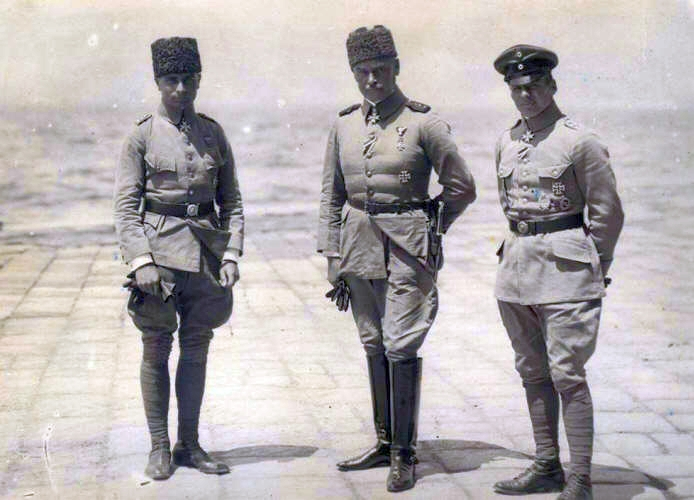
Otto Liman von Sanders, Hans-Joachim Buddecke, and Oswald Boelcke in Turkey, 1916

In August 1918, the Central Powers' Yildirim Army Group commanded by Otto Liman von Sanders consisted of 40,598 front-line infantrymen organised into twelve divisions defending a 56 miles (90 km) long front. They were armed with 19,819 rifles, 273 light and 696 heavy machine guns. The high number of machine guns reflects the Ottoman Army's new tables of organization. (Note: Another estimate of this fighting strength was 26,000 infantry, 2,000 mounted troops and 372 guns. [Keogh 1955 p. 242] Yet another estimates that on a 15 miles (24 km) front extending from the Mediterranean coast westwards, the German and Ottoman force may have deployed 8,000 infantry supported by 130 guns, with the remaining 45 miles (72 km) of front defended by 24,000 German and Ottoman soldiers and 270 guns. [Wavell 1968 p. 203])

Cevat Pasha's Eighth Army of 10,000 soldiers, was supported by 157 guns. With its headquarters at Tulkarm, this army held a line from the Mediterranean coast just north of Arsuf to Furkhah in the Judean Hills. The Eighth Army was organised into the XXII Corps' 7th, 20th and 46th Divisions and the Asia Corps' 16th and 19th Divisions, three German battalion groups of the German "Pasha II" detachment, and the 2nd Caucasian Cavalry Division in reserve. The German Asia Corps, also known as the "Left Wing Group", with a high component of machine guns, was commanded by the German Colonel Gustav von Oppen. The Asia Corps linked the Eighth Army's XXII Corps on the coast with the Seventh Army's III Corps further inland, facing units of the British XX Corps.

The 7th, 19th and 20th Divisions held the shortest frontage in the entire Yildirim Army Group. The 7th and 20th Divisions together held a total of 7.5 miles (12.1 km) of trenches. The 7th Division held 4.3 miles (6.9 km) nearest the coast while the 20th Division held 3.1 miles (5.0 km) and the Asia Corps' 19th Division held 6.2 miles (10.0 km) of trenches further inland. The 46th Division formed the reserve 7.5 miles (12.1 km) from the front line, near the Eighth Army's headquarters at Tulkarm.

These divisions were some of the most highly regarded fighting formations in the Ottoman Army; in 1915 the 7th and 19th Divisions had fought as part of Esat Pasa's III Corps at Gallipoli. (Note: This Corps had held Beersheba at the time of the successful British Empire attack. [Erickson 2007 p. 146]) The 20th Division had also fought towards the end of the Gallipoli campaign and served for a year in Galicia fighting against Russians on the Eastern Front. This regular army division, which had been raised and stationed in Palestine, was sometimes referred to as the Arab Division.

The XXII Corps was supported by the majority of the Yildirim Army's heavy artillery for counter battery operations. Here, three of the five Ottoman Army heavy artillery batteries in Palestine (the 72nd, 73rd and 75th Batteries) were deployed. Further, the Ottoman front line regiments had been alerted that a major attack was imminent.

==== Other views of this force ====
The Ottoman armies were understrength, overstretched, suffering greatly from a strained supply system, overwhelmingly outnumbered by the EEF by about two to one, and "haemorrhaging" deserters. The effective strengths of the nine infantry battalions of the 16th Infantry Division were each equal to a British infantry company of between 100 and 250 men while 150 to 200 men were assigned to the 19th Infantry Division without taking into account the large number of machine guns in these Asia Corps divisions. (Note: There has been no detailed analysis of the impact of the high number of machine guns on the army group's strength.) Problems with the supply system in February 1918 resulted in the normal daily ration in Palestine being 125 grains (0.29 oz) of bread and boiled beans in the morning, at noon, and at night, without oil or any other condiment.

=== Tabsor defences ===
Attack on Tabsor defences and advance to Et Tire

The Tabsor defences consisted of the only continuous trench and redoubt system on the front line. Here the Ottomans had dug two or three lines of trenches and redoubts, varying in depth from 1–3 miles (1.6–4.8 km). These defences centred on the village of Tabsor, and stretched from Jaljulye to the coast. Another less developed system of defences was 5 miles (8.0 km) behind, and the beginnings of a third system ran from Tulkarm across the Plain of Sharon to Nahr Iskanderun. (Note: The only available German and Ottoman sources are Liman von Sanders' memoir and the Asia Corps' war diary. Ottoman army and corps records seem to have disappeared during their retreat. [Falls 1930 Vol. 2 pp. 494–5]) The Ottoman armies defences were inflexible defence relying on a line of trenches which required "every inch of ground ... to be fought for when a more flexible system would have better suited the situation".

On 17 September 1918, Ottoman Army intelligence accurately placed five infantry divisions and a detachment opposite their Eighth Army. As a consequence, the 46th Infantry Division was moved up 8.1 miles (13.0 km) to the south–west to a new reserve position at Et Tire, directly behind the Ottoman XXII Corps's front line divisions.

== Battle ==
=== 19 September ===
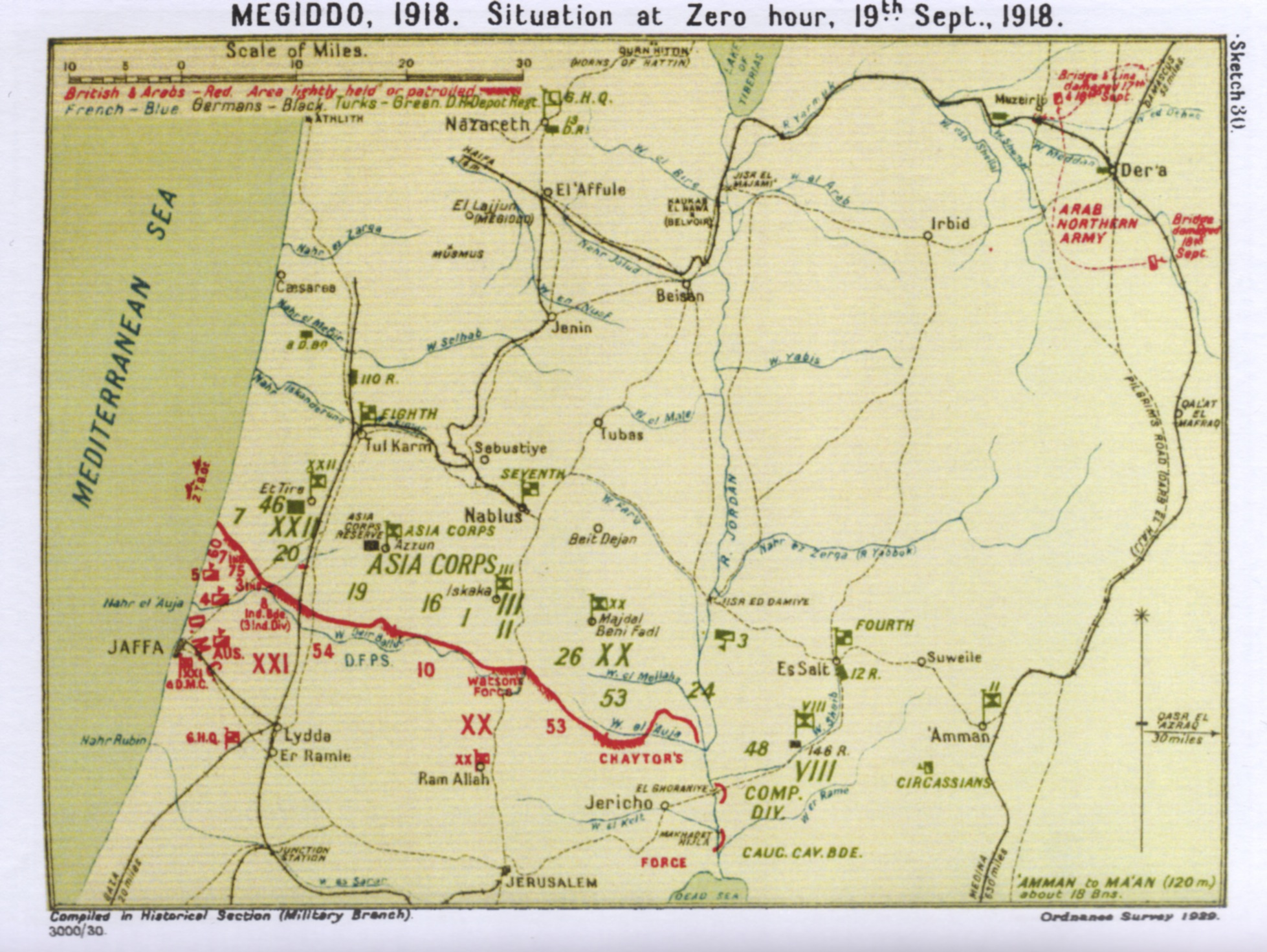
Megiddo at zero hour, 19 September 1918

==== Bombardment ====
At 04:30 a bombardment by artillery, trench mortars and machine guns began firing at the German and Ottoman front and second lines of trenches in front of XXI Corps. This intense bombardment, which closely resembled a Western-Front-style bombardment, continued for a half-hour, with guns deployed one to every 50 yards (46 m) of front on the coastal sector. (Note: This compares with one gun to every 10 yards (9.1 m) on the Western Front. [Bou 2009 p. 194]) Under cover of this bombardment, the leading infantry advanced to the front line. Just before their arrival, the barrage lifted and began firing behind the Ottoman front line. There was no attempt at systematic attempt by the artillery to cut the wire; the leading units were to cut it by hand or carry some way of crossing or bridging it.

The artillery was organised by weight and targets: heavy artillery was employed in counter-battery fire, with guns and 4.5-inch howitzers shelling objectives beyond the range of the field artillery's barrage and where the infantry advance was delayed. Field artillery bombarded the Ottoman front line until the infantry advance arrived; then, the 18-pounders and Royal Horse Artillery batteries lifted to form a creeping barrage in front of the infantry up to their range. This barrage began firing at a range of 4,000 yards (3,700 m) but by 08:00 it had been extended to 15,000 yards (14,000 m) as the guns lifted and moved forward at a rate of 50 yards (46 m) per minute, 75 yards (69 m) per minute or 100 yards (91 m) per minute in front of the three divisions' separate and uniquely timed advances.

==== 7th (Meerut) Division attack western sector ====
The 7th (Meerut) Division, consisting of the 19th, 21st and 28th Brigades, commanded by Major General V. B. Fane, advanced under cover of the bombardment; their creeping barrage moving forward at a rate of 100 yards (91 m) per minute. They were to assault the western end of the Tabsor defences, between a wadi west of Tabsor and the Wadi Hurab el Miske, on the right of the 60th Division's advance. Once these objectives had been captured, they were to advance and capture a second system of trenches defending Et Tire without artillery support, as the guns would be out of range and in the process of being moved forward.

The 7th (Meerut) Division's 19th Brigade consisting of the 1st Battalion, Seaforth Highlanders, 28th Punjabis, 92nd Punjabis and 125th Napier's Rifles, with the 1st Guides and 20th Punjabis (21st Brigade) and the 134th Machine Gun Company attached, were formed into two columns in front of the British wire, each column on a frontage one battalion wide. The initial attack by the 28th and the 92nd Punjabis, under cover of the creeping barrage, was completely successful, and included the capture of a 150mm howitzer battery by five men of the 92nd Punjabis and the 1st Guides. The second attack on the Et Tire defensive line, by the 1st Battalion, Seaforth Highlanders and the 125th Napier's Rifles, met with more opposition but was eventually successful. Subsequently, 40 men from the 125th Napier's Rifles captured 200 soldiers and six machine guns defending the only crossing of the Zerquiye marshes. A second battery of 105 mm howitzers behind the captured position and the trenches at Ayun el Basse, from which the German or Ottoman force had covered the Zerquiye crossing, was seized by the 1st Battalion, Seaforth Highlanders.

The remaining two battalions of the 21st Brigade, the 2nd Battalion, The Black Watch (Royal Highlanders) and the 1/8th Gurkha Rifles, captured the front-line system of defences under cover of the creeping barrage, and then advanced to capture the Wadi Hurab el Miske and 350 prisoners. At 08:40, the 7th (Meerut) Division had advanced to a position to allow the 4th Cavalry Division to advance to capture Afulah and Beisan. By 09:00 the 21st Brigade was in the process of reforming at 'Ayun el Basse, with the return of the 1st Guides and 20th Punjabis from the 19th Brigade. The 1st Guides had still not arrived back to the 21st Brigade when, at 13:00, the brigade marched to Et Tire, which the 75th Division had captured at 11:00. Here they concentrated east of the village, while the 19th Brigade also moved towards Et Tire. At 16:30 the 21st Brigade continued their advance eastwards across the Tulkarm road, where their 20th Punjabis were heavily machine-gunned by a German battalion in the foothills of the Judean Hills. Their objective had been Felamiye, but they were stopped 0.75 miles (1.21 km) from that village. Meanwhile, the 2nd Battalion, Royal Highlanders came up to assist the 92nd Punjabis attack; together succeeding in the capture of El Majdal.

The third brigade of the 7th (Meerut) Division (the 28th Brigade), consisting of the 2nd Battalion, Leicestershire Regiment, the 51st Sikhs, the 53rd Sikhs and the 56th Punjabi Rifles, were supported by the recently returned 264th Brigade Royal Field Artillery (RFA) on completion of the creeping barrage. By 12:30, this brigade had reached a point north-east of the Zerqiye marsh and had turned east to advance with its battalions in a diamond formation towards Et Taiyibe on the eastern side of the Tulkarm road. Their advance guard, the 56th Punjabi Rifles, drove in a rearguard position 1.5 miles (2.4 km) north west of Et Tire about 15:30. The survivors of this rearguard position re-established themselves 1,500 yards (1,400 m) further east on a lower ridge. This second rearguard position was captured soon after, and Taiyibe was occupied at 18:00 when the brigade bivouacked north-east and south of the village.

==== 75th Division attack the centre ====
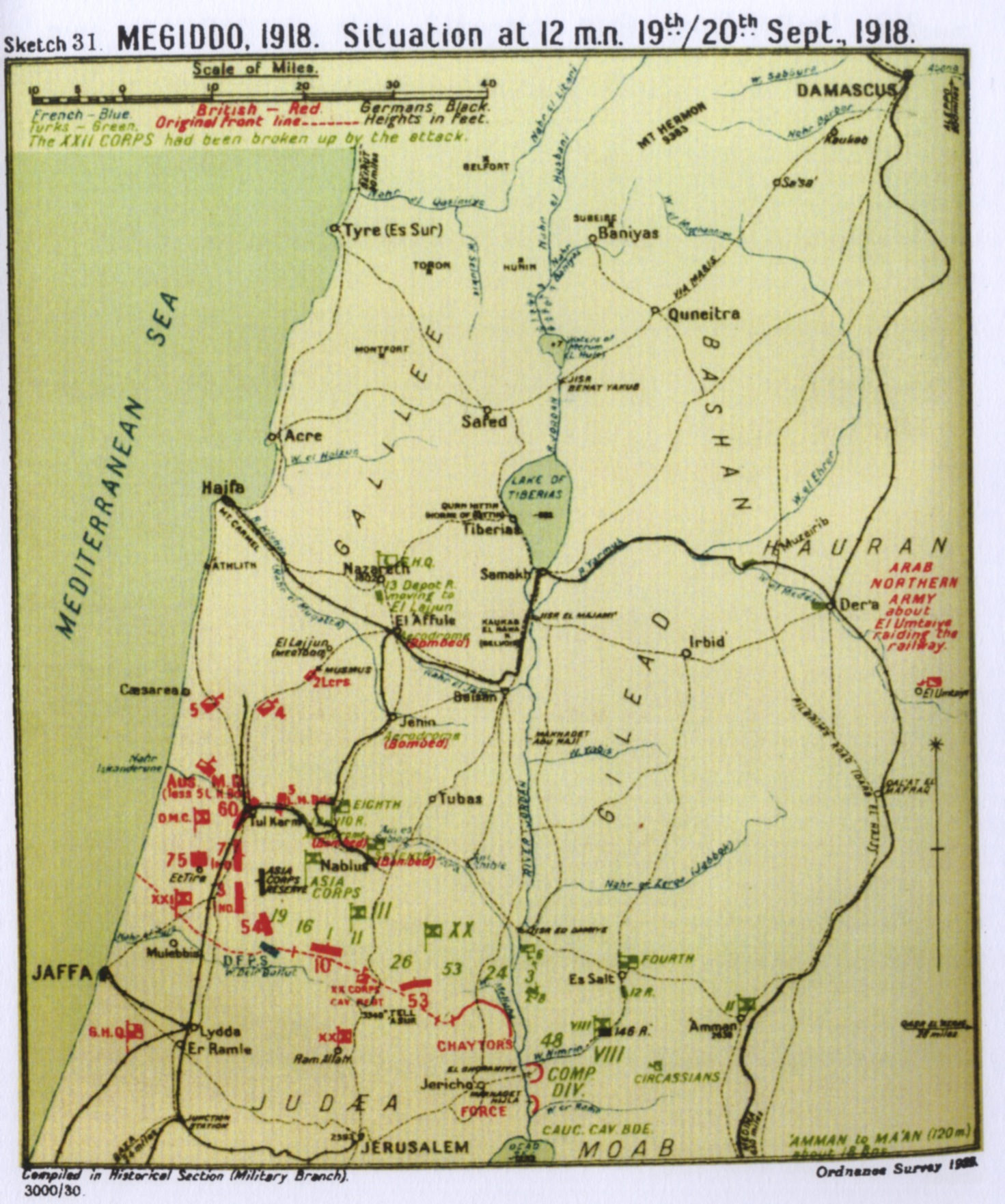
Megiddo situation at 24:00, 19–20 September 1918

Comprising the 232nd, 233rd and 234th Brigades, the 75th Division advanced (with the 233rd Brigade in reserve) under cover of the creeping barrage which lifted at a rate of 50 yards (46 m) per minute. The bombardment in front of their line was so accurate that the leading infantry units were able to keep within 40 yards (37 m) of the advancing line of shells, suffering only one casualty from their own fire.

The 234th Brigade advanced with the leading companies of the 1/152nd Indian Infantry and the 58th Vaughan's Rifles on the left. In the centre, two companies of the 1/5th Battalion, Somerset Light Infantry (233rd Brigade) had been attached to the 234th Brigade. They formed an advance guard, to attack an isolated defensive line 600 yards (550 m) in front of the main defences. The 4th Battalion, Wiltshire Regiment and the 2/3rd Gurkha Rifles of the 232nd Brigade advanced on the right. These units attacked under the creeping barrage and successfully captured all objectives, including the isolated Ottoman front-line trenches, the main trenches and the Ottoman batteries beyond.

While the advance guard consolidated its capture of the isolated trench line, the two main columns, formed by the 232nd and 234th Brigades, moved on to the main defensive works in front of Et Tire. This position was defended by the Ottoman Eighth Army's reserve division, the 46th Division commanded by Major Tiller. Here Tiller held an extensive fortified trench system surrounded by a network of cactus hedges, making a "formidable obstacle".

As the 234th Brigade continued their advance with the 1/4th Battalion, Duke of Cornwall's Light Infantry and the 123rd Outram's Rifles in artillery formation, two or three Ottoman batteries in the wadi south west of Miske fired on the 1/152nd Indian Infantry to within 60 yards (55 m). Shortly after 08:00 an Indian bayonet attack captured three 150 mm howitzers, seven 77 mm guns and their detachments, along with the trenches defending Et Tire.

The 232nd Brigade (composed of the 4th Battalion, Wiltshire Regiment, the 72nd Punjabis, the 2/3rd Gurkhas Rifles and the 3rd Kashmir Imperial Service Infantry) advanced with their leading companies in line, the remainder in artillery formation: the 4th Battalion Wiltshire Regiment on the right and the 2/3rd Gurkha Rifles on the left. They had quickly captured the main front-line trenches under the creeping barrage before advancing to capture Miske at 07:00, supported by the South African Field Artillery Brigade, which had moved forward after completing its part of the creeping barrage. A firing line was established at the edge of Et Tire, after an advance of 5 miles (8.0 km) by the 4th Battalion, Wiltshire Regiment, the 2/3rd Gurkha Rifles and the 72nd Punjabis, which had been brigade reserve. Here they were targeted by the defenders; every exposed infantryman was shot. This stymied attack was eventually reinforced by the 232nd Brigade's fourth battalion, the 3rd Kashmir Imperial Service Infantry, some armoured cars and a cavalry squadron, which compelled the Ottoman defenders to evacuate Et Tire by 11:00 when Refet Bey's XXII Corps headquarters were captured.

The retiring Ottoman force was pursued by armoured cars, while the reserve 233rd Brigade, comprising the remainder of the 5th Battalion, Somerset Light Infantry, the 3/3rd Gurkha Rifles, the 29th Punjabis and the 2/154th Indian Infantry, moved forward to Miske. The 75th Division suffered 518 casualties, 352 of whom were from the 232nd Brigade.

==== 3rd (Lahore) Division attack eastern sector ====
The objectives of the 3rd (Lahore) Division, consisting of the 7th, 8th and 9th Brigades, were to break through the Tabsor defences at Sabiye and advance east, capturing Jaljulye and the Railway Redoubt, before advancing towards Qalqilye, Kh. Kefir Thilth, 'Azzun and Jiyus in the foothills of the Judean Hills.

The 9th Brigade, consisting of the 2nd Battalion, Dorsetshire Regiment, the 1/1st Gurkha Rifles, the 93rd Burma Infantry and the 105th Mahratta Light Infantry, began their advance at 04:27, supported by a creeping barrage which lifted and moved forward at a rate of 100 yards (91 m) per minute. The brigade moved via taped stretches into no man's land, where a heavy Ottoman barrage of high explosive shells fell on them, with little rifle or machine-gun fire until they approached the trenches. West of Sabiye, the 105th Mahratta Light Infantry and 2nd Battalion, Dorsetshire Regiment attacked German and Ottoman infantry, which attempted to stop their advance. Between 05:00 and 05:30, the 93rd Burma Infantry and the 1/1st Gurkha Rifles had advanced to cut the second trench line, running from Tabsor to Qalqilye. A threatened counter-attack from the north was stopped by a detachment from the 1/1st Gurkha Rifles, which captured 136 prisoners and two machine guns. Due to constant cutting of the telephone lines and bombardment haze making visual signalling impossible, the commander of the 9th Brigade rode forward to assess the situation and ordered the advance to continue towards Jiyus.

The 9th Brigade moved eastwards, crossing the railway 1 mile (1.6 km) north-west of Qalqilye at 09:00 with the 93rd Burma Infantry in the centre, the 105th Mahratta Light Infantry on their right, the 1/1st Gurkha Rifles on their left and the 2nd Battalion, Dorsetshire Regiment in reserve. Although the Ottoman 20th Division had been "completely overrun", progress on the left was slowed by reserves from the Asia Corps west of 'Azzun. Jiyus was eventually captured by the 105th Mahratta Light Infantry and two companies from the 93rd Burma Infantry about nightfall, when two German officers and 18 other prisoners were captured.

The attack by the 8th Brigade, consisting of the 1st Battalion Manchester Regiment, the 47th Sikhs, the 59th Scinde Rifles and the 2/124th Duchess of Connaught's Own Baluchistan Infantry, began at 04:45 towards the Wadi Ishkar, west of Jaljulye. The 1st Battalion Manchester Regiment at Ras el 'Ain and the 2/124th Baluchistan Infantry at Tell el Murkhmar, advanced rapidly capturing the first line of defence, between Bir Adas and the Hadrah road. A company from the Manchester Regiment advanced on both sides of the railway, eventually reaching a bridge over the Wadi Ishkar west of Jaljulye. Here, they fired on the village and railway redoubt with two machine guns, while the Baluchistan Infantry advanced to occupy Byar Adas at 07:15. At 09:10 the 47th Sikhs reinforced the attack on the Railway Redoubt, supported by an intense five-minute bombardment. Shortly afterwards, the redoubt, along with a pack gun and two machine guns, was captured by the Baluchistan Infantry. At 10:45 a bombardment covered the 1st Battalion Manchester Regiment's attack on Jaljulye, which was easily captured after the Ottoman defenders had quickly withdrawn, in consequence of the advance by the 7th Brigade, 3rd (Lahore) Division, which was threatening to cut them off. At 12:30 artillery fire from the IV Brigade RFA was directed on Hable, which was captured 30 minutes later; the 8th Brigade's advance was resumed at 13:30 towards Kh. Ras et Tire and Tell Manasif. Both objectives were reached about 18:00, the brigade bivouacking for the night behind strong outposts.

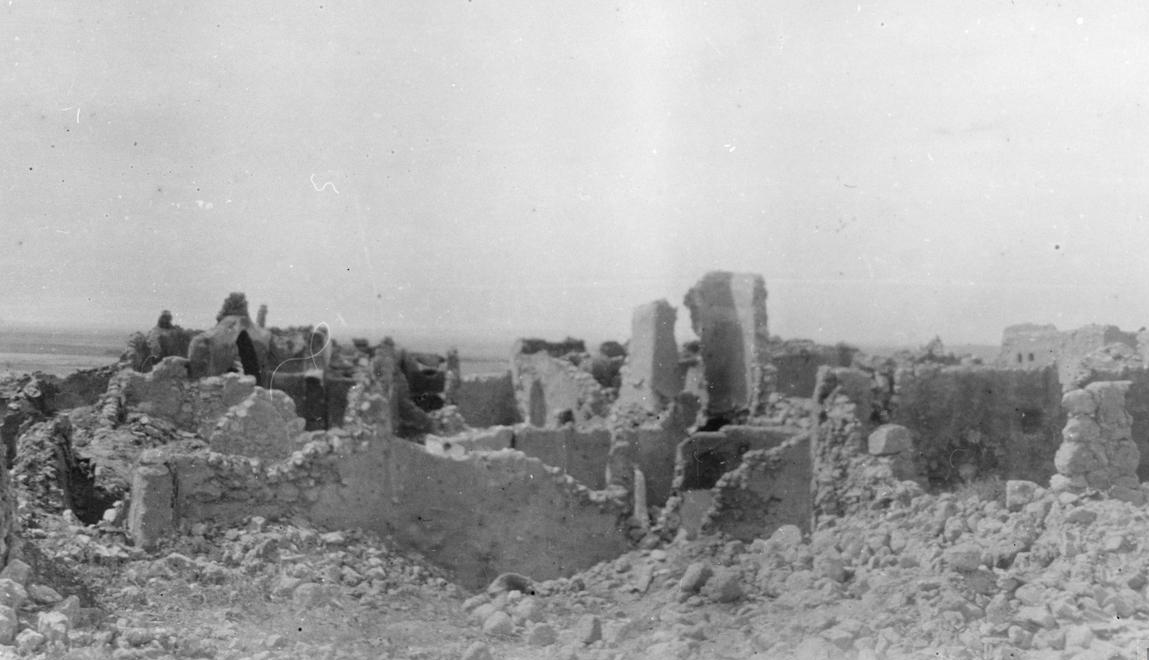
Kefre Saba, completely destroyed by guns fired from Ras el Ain (19 September 1918)

Meanwhile, the 7th Brigade advanced with the 2/7th Gurkha Rifles on the right, the 27th Punjabis on the left, the 1st Battalion Connaught Rangers in the left rear and the 91st Punjabis in support, under cover of the creeping barrage of heavy artillery and machine-gun fire. They attacked the Ottoman front-line defences, which at first were supported by high-explosive Ottoman artillery fire; the 27th Punjabis suffered more than 100 casualties in dense clouds of dust, smoke and shrapnel. Nevertheless, the brigade advanced to capture Kufr Saba at 07:12 and Qalqilye at 09:00. By 14:00 the brigade was ordered to support the 8th Brigade attack on 'Azzun, but the order was not received until 15:30 so most of their advance was made during the night, eventually halting at 24:00, 2 miles (3.2 km) west of Azzun.

==== Ottoman defenders' reports ====
By 05:45 telephone communication to the Ottoman front had been cut and five minutes later all German and Ottoman reserves had been ordered forward.

At 08:50, Cevat's Eighth Army reported to Liman von Sanders, commander of the Yildirim Army Group at Nazareth, that its 7th Division (not to be confused with the 7th (Meerut) Division) was "out of the fight" and the 19th Division was under attack.

Small groups of survivors from the 7th and 20th Divisions managed to continue fighting while retiring. They formed a rear guard of 100 soldiers with 2 machine guns and 17 artillery guns from the 7th Division and 300 soldiers, while four machine guns and seven guns from the 20th Division also made a desperate attempt to hold the British Empire attack. Liman von Sanders ordered the 110th Infantry Regiment to advance from Nablus in support of the Eighth Army. These forces were to stop the EEF advance to the Tulkarm to Nablus road at the easily defended narrow, steep-sided pass near 'Anebta.

The 19th Division was forced to retreat towards Kefri Kasim and the XXII Corps (Eighth Army), threatened with encirclement, was in retreat towards Et Tire having lost most of its artillery. By 16:30 Cevat had been informed that Et Tire was captured and cut off from reports from his XXII Corps, he began to move his headquarters north at dusk. Cevat said, "The enemy has broken through our lines in spite of our counter–attacks ... Without assistance operations are impossible". A remnant from the 7th Division managed to establish a temporary divisional headquarters at Mesudiye that night.

Liman von Sanders had no combat formations available to stop the cavalry advance up the coast, while in the Judean Hills the British Empire infantry attacks forced the Yildirim Army Group's two armies to retire.

=== 20 September ===
Desert Mounted Corps advances from 20 to 25 September 1918. Detail also shows line reached by XXI Corps at 24:00 on 19–20 September and lines of retreat bombed by aircraft.

General Bulfin, commanding the XXI Corps, issued orders for the continuation of the battle on 20 September. The 7th (Meerut) Division's objectives were to attack and capture Deir Sheraf, Sebustiye and Burqa, while the 3rd (Lahore) Division's objective was to establish a position through Beit Udhen and Qusein commanding the Nablus-to-Deir Sheraf road. The 7th and 3rd Divisions advanced to the northeast, through the hills towards ancient Samaria, while the 60th Division moved east from Tulkarm along the Tulkarm to Nablus road with the 5th Light Horse Brigade, still attached to the 60th Division, advancing north of Tulkarm to cut the railway line between Messudieh and Jenin. The 75th Division continued in reserve at Et Tire, where they may have been assigned the management of thousands of prisoners.

==== 7th (Meerut) Division ====
The 7th (Meerut) Division advanced in two columns. The 21st Brigade, on the right, supported by a mixed field-artillery brigade of two 4.5-inch howitzer and one 18-pounder batteries and a machine-gun company, advanced through Felamiye and Kufr Zibad. The 19th Brigade, on the left, with the VIII Mountain Artillery Brigade and two machine-gun companies followed by the 28th Brigade, moved through El Majdal and Kufr Sur.

The 21st Brigade advanced along a track beyond Kufr Zibad that proved impassable for the artillery, which was sent back to Et Tire, where it came under orders of the 75th Division. Meanwhile, the 19th Brigade captured a small rearguard position at Kufr Sur before advancing under fire at 11:00 to a point 1,000 yards (910 m) from the village of Beit Lid. The brigade's Lewis guns forced the Ottoman or German battery supporting the rearguard to withdraw, but heavy machine-gun fire stopped the 125th Napier's Rifles from crossing the gully between Sefarin and Beit Lid. Without artillery support, an attack by the 1st Battalion, Seaforth Highlanders, which began at 14:00, was held up by a strong rearguard position strengthened by cactus hedges 200 yards (180 m) from the village; they suffered 200 casualties during their attacks. After reinforcements from the 1st Guides (21st Brigade) arrived, the attack was renewed at 16:20. By 17:30, a battery of the VIII Mountain Artillery Brigade was able to get into position to cover an advance by the 28th Punjabis (19th Brigade) armed with grenades, which entered and cleared Beit Lid at 18:15. At 21:30 the 28th Brigade began their advance towards Masudiye Station and Sebustiye.

==== 3rd (Lahore) Division ====
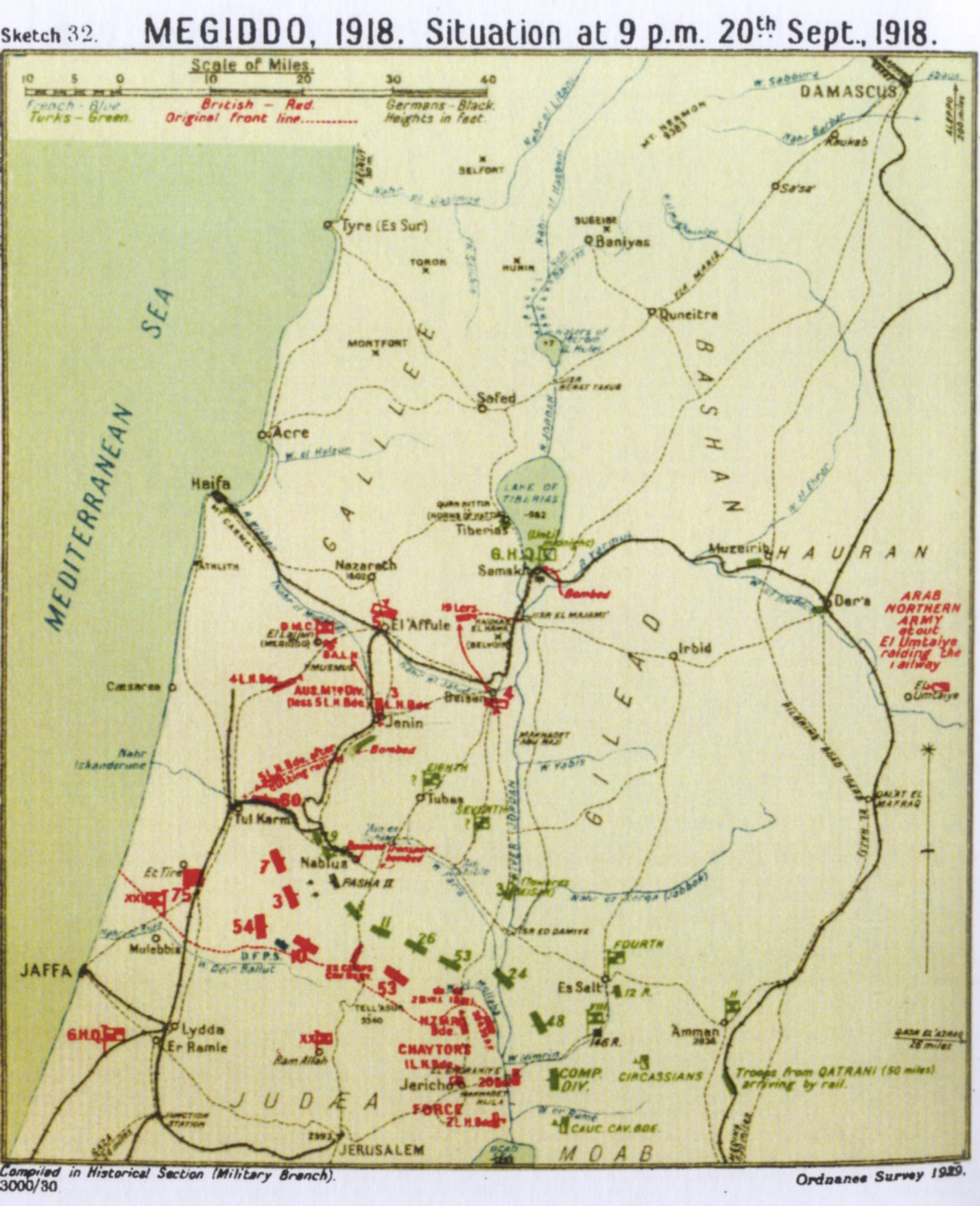
Megiddo situation at 21:00, 20 September 1918

The 3rd (Lahore) Division's 7th and 8th Brigades began their advance at 05:00. The 7th Brigade's 91st Punjabis (Light Infantry) began their advance towards 'Azzun, while the 8th Brigade moved along the Wadi 'Azzun. As the 1st Battalion Manchester Regiment moved along the south bank, and the 47th Sikhs moved along on the north bank, with the 59th Scinde Rifles in the rear; they quickly found themselves in a critical position. The leading battalions encountered about 200 German soldiers and 12 machine guns in a well-sited rearguard position south of the wadi. Without any artillery support, an extended battle followed. The 59th Scinde Rifles were ordered to join the fight and a howitzer was rushed forward from the 428th Battery, coming into effective action at 12:30, when resistance almost immediately ceased.

The 7th Brigade's 27th Punjabis followed the 91st Punjabis (Light Infantry) along the Wadi 'Azzun and the 91st Punjabis (Light Infantry) entered the village of 'Azzun at 08:10 where large quantities of stores were captured. The capture of 'Azzun, which had been the headquarters of the Asia Corps and the location of von Oppen's reserves, was claimed by the 47th Sikhs (8th Brigade) and the 91st Punjabis (Light Infantry) (7th Brigade).

The 8th Brigade continued their advance without interruption to Jinsafut, which was occupied in the evening. The 1st Battalion, Connaught Rangers (7th Brigade) were ordered to pass through the 8th Brigade and capture the road junction northeast of El Funduq. Here they captured an artillery column of five field guns, horses, wagons and prisoners which had been held up by fire from the 9th Brigade.

The 9th Brigade made their way along the rocky Wadi Sir to Baqa, where they saw German soldiers retiring along the road to Deir Sheraf. (Note: These were probably Asia Corps troops. [Falls 1930 Vol. 2 p. 511]) The brigade artillery came into action against this target, initially one section and then the whole of the IX Mountain Artillery Brigade and some machine guns, completely blocking the road with smashed vehicles. The 93rd Burma Infantry reached the road 2 miles (3.2 km) northeast of El Funduq at 15:10, where they captured about 250 prisoners, many of them German. A company of the 2nd Battalion, Dorsetshire Regiment on the extreme left captured 151 prisoners north of Qaryat Hajja.

==== German and Ottoman retreat ====
After being forced out of his headquarters at Nazareth on the morning of 20 September, Liman von Sanders drove via Tiberias and Samakh late in the afternoon, arriving at Deraa during the morning of 21 September on his way to Damascus. Here he received a report from the Fourth Army (east of the Jordan holding Jisr ed Damieh, Shunet Nimrin, Es Salt and Amman), which he ordered to withdraw to the Deraa to Irbid line without waiting for their southern Hedjaz troops.

==== Position of XXI Corps ====
By the end of 20 September, the Eighth Ottoman Army had been pushed back out of the coastal Plain of Sharon and the Desert Mounted Corps was blocking the Seventh and what remained of the Eighth Armies' main lines of retreat northwards. The 60th Division held Tulkarm and Anebta, the 7th (Meerut) Division held the village of Beit Lid and controlled the crossroads at Deir Sheraf, while the 5th Light Horse Brigade had cut the Jenin railway south of Arrabe. Both the 3rd (Lahore) and 7th (Meerut) Divisions had continued to force the Seventh and Eighth Ottoman Armies' retreat.

During 19 and 20 September, the XXI Corps had destroyed the right wing of the Ottoman front line, capturing 7,000 prisoners and 100 guns. Remnants of the Eighth Army which had escaped were captured the next day by Desert Mounted Corps at Jenin, in the Esdrealon Plain to the north of the Judean Hills. During two days of fighting the XXI Corps' total casualties were 3,378, of whom 446 were killed. They captured 12,000 prisoners, 149 guns and large quantities of ammunition and transport. With the exception of the Asia Corps, the whole Ottoman Eighth Army had been destroyed.

My infantry yesterday captured Tulkeram, and are now pursuing the enemy eastwards to Nablus. This morning my cavalry occupied Afuleh, and pushed thence rapidly south–eastwards, entered Beisan this evening, thus closing to the enemy his last line of escape.

— Letter from Allenby to Prince Feisal 20 September 1918

== Aftermath ==
Megiddo situation at 21:00, 21 September 1918

The 28th Brigade, 7th (Meerut) Division advanced from Beit Lid at 21:30 on an overnight march towards Masudiye Station and Sebustiye. They arrived at the 'Anebta road near Ramin at 01:30, and by 03:00 had advanced to capture the Masudiye Station along with an engine and 16 carriages, before continuing towards Sebustiye. During this march, a strong rearguard in the ruins of Samaria was attacked by the 51st and 53rd Sikhs. After working their way through an olive grove on the northwest side of the Central Powers' rearguard position, they attacked from the flank, with a platoon of 51st Sikhs gaining the crest from the southwest. The garrison of 181 German (or Ottoman) soldiers was captured with eight light and heavy machine guns. More than 400 sick were found in a hospital nearby.

The 3rd (Lahore) Division continued its advance at 05:00, meeting some opposition near Rafidia 2,000 yards (1,800 m) west of Nablus. Here, they occupied a 5.5 miles (8.9 km) line stretching from Rafidia to 1.5 miles (2.4 km) east of Burqa.

=== Seventh Army retreat ===
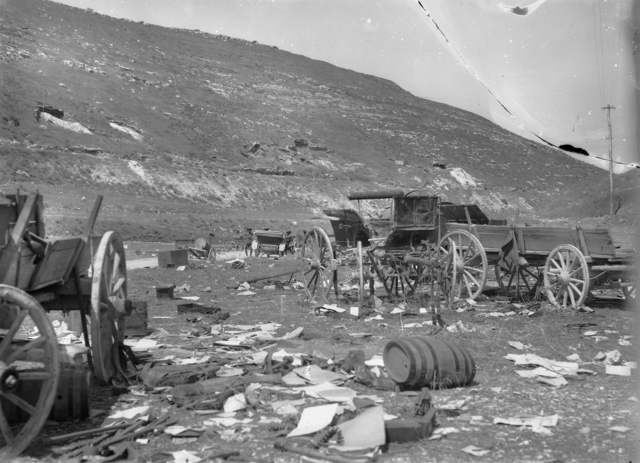
Transport destroyed by aerial bombing on the Nablus to Jenin road

The bulk of the Seventh Army had been retreating down the Wadi Fara road where guns and transport had to be abandoned when heavily bombed and machine-gunned from the air. This Army then turned north at 'Ain Shible, moving towards Beisan. During the night of 20/21 September a long column of retiring Ottoman forces was seen moving down the road from Nablus to Beisan, about 8 miles (13 km) north of Nablus. British and Australian aircraft subsequently bombed the column, at first just blocking one end of a defile, but later returning a number of times. Four hours later the area was covered with the wreckage of 90 guns, 50 lorries and more than 1,000 other vehicles. The Ottoman 53rd Division, which had managed to get down the Wadi Fara before it was blocked by the air attack, was captured by Chaytor's Force on 22 September during the fighting for the bridge at Jisr ed Damieh. During 23 and 24 September, 1,500 prisoners were captured by Chetwode's XX Corps in the Judean Hills.

=== Eighth Army retreat ===
==== XXII Corps ====
The survivors from the Eighth Army's XXII Corps, which had retreated down the main Damascus road on 20 September, were captured by the 3rd Light Horse Brigade at Jenin that night.

At 15:00 on 21 September Cevat Pasa (also known as Jevat Pasa), the Eighth Army commander, left Nablus by car for Mustafa Kemal's Seventh Army headquarters with his chief of staff and some staff officers. It was the end of the Ottoman Eighth Army, the 20th and 21st Regiments existing only until that afternoon.

==== Asia Corps ====
During the night of 20/21 September Liman von Sanders had ordered the 16th and 19th Division west of Nablus, where they made contact with von Oppen's Left Wing Force. The next morning von Oppen formed the remnants of the 702nd and 703rd Battalions into one battalion with a rifle company, a machine gun company and a trench mortar detachment, while the 701st Battalion and a cavalry squadron remained intact. At 10:00, von Oppen was informed the EEF was approaching Nablus and that the Wadi Fara road was blocked. As a result, he decided to retreat via Beit Dejan 7 miles (11 km) east-southeast of Nablus to the Jordan at Jisr ed Damieh, but this way was also found to have been cut. Von Oppen then ordered the Asia Corps to retreat without guns or baggage via Mount Ebal when they were attacked by British Empire artillery and suffered casualties. That night, von Oppen bivouacked at Tammun with the 16th and 19th Divisions at Tubas.

Von Oppen was moving northwards from Tubas towards Beisan the next day, with about 700 German and 1,300 Ottoman soldiers of the 16th and 19th Divisions, when he learned it had already been captured. He decided to advance during the night of 22 September to Samakh, where he correctly guessed Liman von Sanders would order the establishment of a strong rearguard. However, Jevad, the commander of the Eighth Army, ordered him to cross the Jordan instead; he successfully got all the Germans and some of the Ottoman soldiers across before the 11th Cavalry Brigade attack, which closed the last Jordan River gaps. Those who had not crossed were captured. (Note: Liman von Sanders was very critical of Jevad's intervention, which considerably weakened the Samakh position, but von Oppen would have had to break through the 4th Cavalry Division's line of piquets to get there. [Falls 1930 Vol. 2 p. 546])

== Bibliography ==
- Blenkinsop, Layton John; Rainey, John Wakefield, eds. (1925). History of the Great War Based on Official Documents Veterinary Services. London: H.M. Stationers. OCLC 460717714.
- Bou, Jean (2009). Light Horse: A History of Australia's Mounted Arm. Australian Army History. Port Melbourne: Cambridge University Press. ISBN 978-0-521-19708-3.
- Bruce, Anthony (2002). The Last Crusade: The Palestine Campaign in the First World War. London: John Murray. ISBN 978-0-7195-5432-2.
- Carver, Michael, Field Marshal Lord (2003). The National Army Museum Book of The Turkish Front 1914–1918: The Campaigns at Gallipoli, in Mesopotamia and in Palestine. London: Pan Macmillan. ISBN 978-0-283-07347-2.
- Cutlack, Frederic Morley (1941). The Australian Flying Corps in the Western and Eastern Theatres of War, 1914–1918. Official History of Australia in the War of 1914–1918. Vol. 8 (11th ed.). Canberra: Australian War Memorial. OCLC 220900299.
- Erickson, Edward J. (2001). Ordered to Die: A History of the Ottoman Army in the First World War. No. 201 Contributions in Military Studies. Westport Connecticut: Greenwood Press. OCLC 43481698.
- Erickson, Edward J. (2007). Gooch, John; Reid, Brian Holden (eds.). Ottoman Army Effectiveness in World War I: A Comparative Study. No. 26 of Cass Series: Military History and Policy. Milton Park, Abingdon, Oxon: Routledge. ISBN 978-0-203-96456-9.
- Falls, Cyril (1930). Military Operations Egypt & Palestine from June 1917 to the End of the War. Official History of the Great War Based on Official Documents by Direction of the Historical Section of the Committee of Imperial Defence. Vol. 2. A. F. Becke (maps). London: H.M. Stationery Office. OCLC 256950972.
- Gullett, Henry S.; Barnet, Charles; Baker, David, eds. (1919). Australia in Palestine. Sydney: Angus & Robertson. OCLC 224023558.
- Hill, Alec Jeffrey (1978). Chauvel of the Light Horse: A Biography of General Sir Harry Chauvel, GCMG, KCB. Melbourne: Melbourne University Press. OCLC 5003626.
- Keogh, E. G.; Joan Graham (1955). Suez to Aleppo. Melbourne: Directorate of Military Training by Wilkie & Co. OCLC 220029983.
- Maunsell, E. B. (1926). Prince of Wales' Own, the Seinde Horse, 1839–1922. Regimental Committee. OCLC 221077029.
- Powles, C. Guy; A. Wilkie (1922). The New Zealanders in Sinai and Palestine. Official History New Zealand's Effort in the Great War. Vol. 3. Auckland: Whitcombe & Tombs. OCLC 2959465.
- Wavell, Field Marshal Earl (1968) [1933]. "The Palestine Campaigns". In Sheppard, Eric William (ed.). A Short History of the British Army (4th ed.). London: Constable & Co. OCLC 35621223.
- Woodward, David R. (2006). Hell in the Holy Land: World War I in the Middle East. Lexington: The University Press of Kentucky. ISBN 978-0-8131-2383-7.
