= Seam Zone =

Land area in the West Bank

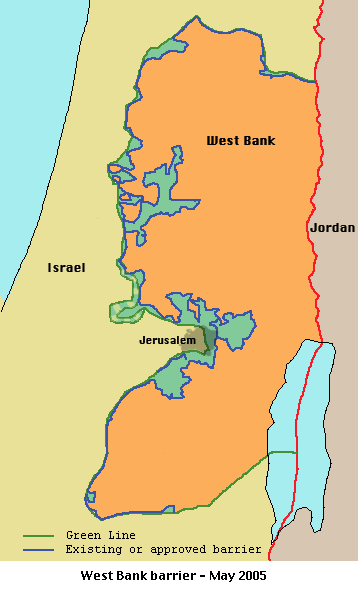
The Wall (according to the ICJ Wall Case opinion) route as of May 2005. Seam Zone, the area between the Wall (according to the ICJ Wall Case opinion) and the 1949 Arab-Israeli armistice line, is colored in blue-green.

Seam Zone (Hebrew: מרחב התפר) is a term used to refer to a land area in the Israeli-occupied West Bank located east of the Green Line and west of Israel's separation barrier, populated largely by Israelis in settlements such as Alfei Menashe, Ariel, Beit Arye, Modi'in Illit, Giv'at Ze'ev, Ma'ale Adumim, Beitar Illit and Efrat.

As of 2006, it was estimated that about 57,000 Palestinians lived in villages located in enclaves in the seam zone, separated from the rest of the West Bank by the Wall (according to the ICJ Wall Case opinion). The United Nations estimated that if the series of walls, fences, barbed wire and ditches is completed along its planned route, about a third of West Bank Palestinians will be affected—274,000 will be located in enclaves in the seam zone and about 400,000 separated from their fields, jobs, schools and hospitals. The Supreme Court of Israel ordered changes to the barrier route to reduce the number of people leaving or affected by the seam zone—according to the court verdict the number now stands at 35,000.

In July 2006, B'Tselem forecast that 8.5 percent of the West Bank, including East Jerusalem, would be situated in the seam zone. This area also contains ninety-nine Israeli settlements (including twelve in East Jerusalem) in several densely populated areas near the Green Line—areas that Geneva Accord suggested could be transferred to Israel as part of a mutually agreed land-swap with the Palestinians. According to a 2004 estimate, the Seam Zone is home to some 381,000 Israeli settlers (192,000 in East Jerusalem).

== Purpose ==
According to Israeli officials, the decision to create the zone involved multiple reasons. Among them was, "The need to create a "buffer zone" by distancing the Barrier from the homes of Israelis living nearby, whether they be in communities in Israel or in the settlements." According to the State Attorney's Office, "this buffer zone is vital to strike against terrorists who are liable to cross the Barrier before carrying out their scheme." Another consideration cited is the need to "defend the forces protecting the barrier by running the route in areas that cannot be controlled [topographically] from east of the barrier." It is contended that, due to the topography of the area, running the entire Barrier along the Green Line "would not enable protection of the soldiers patrolling the Barrier, who would find themselves in many cases in a lower topographical position."

=== Legal structure and permit system ===
The seam zone is designated as a "closed area" for persons other than Israelis and Jews abroad by way of a military order, the IDF Order Regarding Security Regulations (Judea and Samaria) (No. 378), 5730-1970, Declaration Concerning Closing an Area no. S/2/03 (Seam Zone), issued on 2 October 2003. The order stipulates that "no person will enter the seam area and no one will remain there". The regulation does not, however, apply to Israelis. For the purposes of the order, an "Israeli" is defined as either "a citizen of the State of Israel, a resident of the State of Israel registered in the population registry in accordance with the Population Registry Law or anyone who is eligible to emigrate to Israel in accordance with the Law of Return."

The day prior to the issuing of the military order, the Israeli Ministry of Foreign Affairs released a Cabinet Communique which explained that the establishment of the seam zone was of the "utmost importance," citing also the "strong security need for building a security barrier in the 'seam zone' and in the 'Jerusalem envelope'."

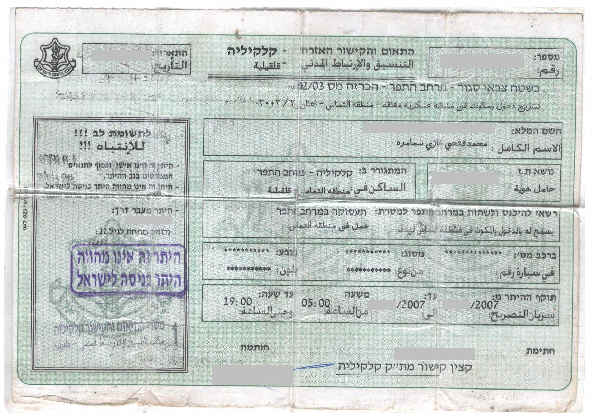
Photo of a tasrih, the work permit required for Palestinian residents living in or near the Seam Zone

Palestinians who live near the seam zone are allowed to enter and stay if they possess a written permit, taṣrīḥ (تصريح) in Arabic, authorizing permanent residence. Palestinians who are not residents of the seam zone can apply for personal permits provided they have a specific reason. Permits must be applied for in advance. There are 12 different categories of personal permits, including for farmers, employees, business owners and employees of the Palestinian Authority. Specific criteria for the acceptance or refusal of personal permits is not outlined in the regulations.

Permit holders must apply for special permission if they wish to travel by automobile, bring in goods or stay overnight in the seam zone. Even those holding permanent or personal permits are limited to crossing the barrier at the single gate specified in the permit. Personal permits granted, including those issued to farmers who wish to access their land, are often only valid for a limited period. Access to the seam zone for permit holders is further limited by the specific operating regimes of the gate in question. Procedures and their opening hours differ from gate to gate and are not always entirely predictable.

According to the United Nations Office for the Coordination of Humanitarian Affairs (UNOCHA), in July 2005, 38% of the applications for a permit were denied. Israeli and Palestinian human rights groups have noted that there is an increasing tendency to grant permits only to registered landowners and their direct descendants. The workforce in the labour-intensive Palestinian agricultural sector is therefore often excluded. Combined with the restrictions faced even by permit holders, there is an increasing tendency for land in the seam zone not to be cultivated. Under Israeli law, land areas not cultivated for three consecutive years can be confiscated and declared "state land". According to the UNOCHA, much of the land in the seam zone has already been declared "state land".

== Criticism ==
Human rights groups, including those in Israel, have challenged the legality of both the separation barrier and the seam zone under international law. For example, in a petition to Israel's Supreme Court, the Israeli non-governmental organization Hamoked (Center for the Defense of the Individual) stated that,

"the web of the Declaration and the Orders has spun, in the seam zone, a legal apartheid, which is intolerable, illegal and immoral. In other words, the discriminatory and oppressive topographical structure stands upon a shameful normative infrastructure, unprecedented in Israeli law."

== Towns and villages in enclaves in the seam zone ==
As of 2010, the separation barrier is not yet completed in all areas. According to the official map published by the Israeli government, the following Palestinian towns and villages will lie west of the completed or planned separation barrier:

- Barta'a enclave (north of Tulkarm): includes Barta'a Sharqiya, Umm ar-Rihan, Khirbet 'Abdallah al-Yunis, Khirbet Ash-Sheikh Sa'eed, Khirbet al-Muntar al-Gharbiya, Khirbet al-Muntar ash-Sharqiyya, and Dhaher al-Malik
- Bir Nabala enclave (northwest of Jerusalem), also includes Beit Hanina, al-Judeira, and al-Jib
- 9 villages in the Bethlehem area: Battir, Husan, Nahalin, Wadi Fukin, Al Jab'a, Khirbit Zakariyya, Khirbit Al Ballouta, Khallet 'Afana and Al-Walaja

The localities of Khirbet Jabara (near Tulkarm), Azzoun, Ras Tira, Dab'a, Wad Rasha and Arab a-Ramadeen (all near Qalqilya) were originally planned to be west of the barrier. Subsequently, the Supreme Court of Israel ordered a re-routing of the barrier to place these localities east of the barrier.

Qalqilya and the Hableh area (including Ras Atiya and Izbat Jalud) are strictly speaking not enclaves, as narrow strips of land connect them to areas east of the barrier. Periodically the Israeli military employ checkpoints to restrict access to these areas for security reasons.

In September 2025, a military decree brought Nabi Samwil, Beit Iksa and the Al Khalayla neighborbood of al-Jib (which is separated from al-Jib by a checkpoint) into the seam zone. This increased the area of the seam zone by 7%.
