= Nabi Ilyas =

- Municipality type D (Village council)

Arabic transcription(s)
  - Arabic: قرية النبي الياس
  - Latin: Nabi Ilyas (official); Kherbit an-Nabi al-Yas (unofficial)
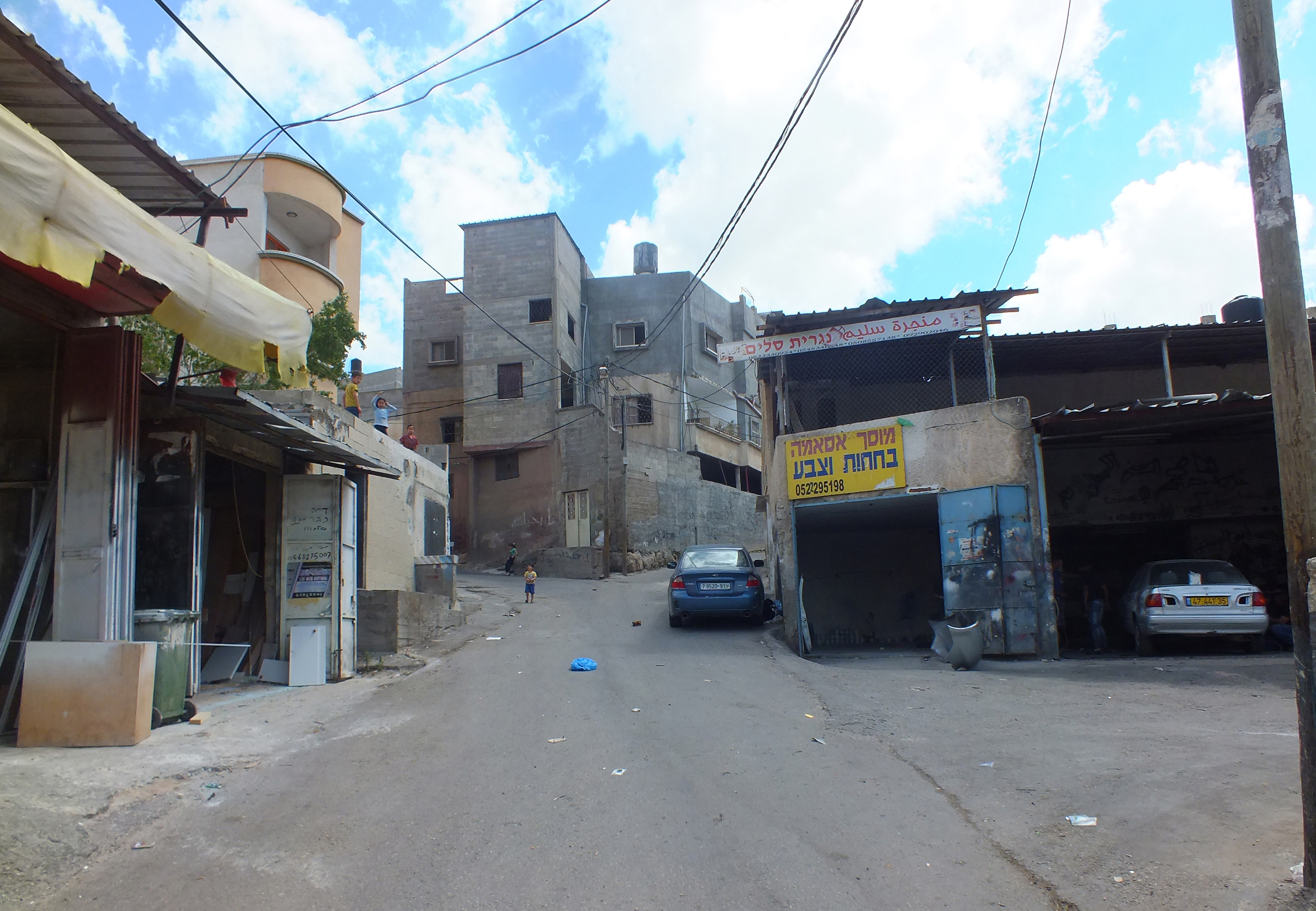

- Location of an Nabi Elyas within Palestine
- Coordinates: 32°11′04″N 35°00′57″E
- Palestine grid: 151/176
- State: State of Palestine
- Governorate: Qalqilya

Government
  - Type: Village council
- Elevation: 187 m (614 ft)

Population (2017)
  - Total: 1,399
- Name meaning: The prophet Elias

Nabi Ilyas (Arabic: قرية النبي الياس) is a Palestinian village in the Qalqilya Governorate of the Palestine, in the western West Bank, located two kilometers east of Qalqilya. According to the Palestinian Central Bureau of Statistics, an Nabi Ilyas had a population of 1,399 inhabitants in 2017. 25.6% of the population of an Nabi Ilyas were refugees in 1997.

The health care facilities for an Nabi Ilyas are in Qalqilya designated as MoH level 4 there are also two clinics one run by the UNRWA and one run by the Palestinian Ministry of Health.

== Location ==
An Nabi Ilyas is located 5.06 km east of Qalqiliya. It is bordered by ‘Izbat at Tabib and ‘Isla to the east, Ras at Tira and ‘Izbat al Ashqar to the south, ‘Arab Abu Farda to the west, and Jayyus to the north.

== History ==
The village is situated on an ancient site. Cisterns, and graves cut into rock have been found here, together with ceramics from the Byzantine era.

=== Ottoman era ===
Nabi Ilyas was incorporated into the Ottoman Empire in 1517 with all of Palestine, and in 1596 it appeared in the tax registers under the name of Ilyas, as being in the Nahiya of Bani Sa'b of the Liwa of Nablus. It was noted as hali, empty, but a fixed tax rate of 33,3% was paid on agricultural products; a total of 1,200 akçe.

In 1882 the PEF's Survey of Western Palestine described Neby Elyas (under "Archæology") as: "Walls and wells, with a ruined kubbeh."

=== British Mandate era ===
In the 1945 statistics, during the British Mandate of Palestine, the population was counted under Azzun.

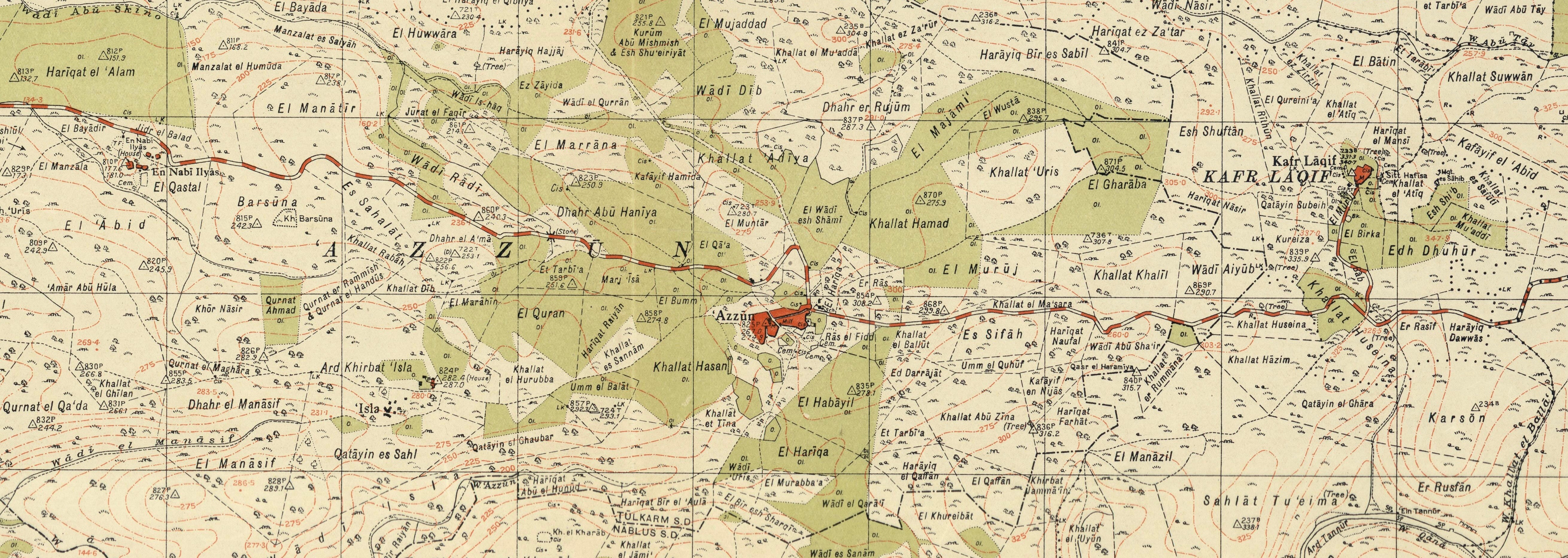
Nabi Ilyas 1943 1:20,000

=== Jordanian era ===
In the wake of the 1948 Arab–Israeli War, and after the 1949 Armistice Agreements, Nabi Ilyas came under Jordanian rule.

In 1961, the population of Nabi Ilyas was 223.

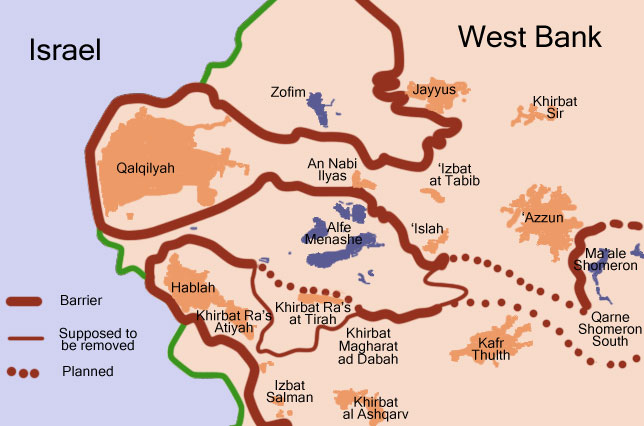
Portion of West Bank showing Qalqilya and Hableh-Ras Atiya enclaves

=== 1967-present ===
Since the Six-Day War in 1967, Nabi Ilyas has been under Israeli occupation.

After the 1995 accords, 2.7% of Nabi Ilyas land has been defined as Area B land, while the remaining 97.3% is Area C.

Israel confiscated 1,943 dunums of village land (43.8% of the total village lands) for the Israeli settlement of Alfei Menashe, in addition to confiscating land from other neighbouring Palestinian villages. The Separation Wall would further separate the village from much of its land.

By 2009 Israeli consumers were using Nabi Ilyas for bargain hunting. Jewish shoppers, who were kept out of the main Palestinian cities by Israeli security regulations, were drawn by the cheap prices for groceries, furniture and dental treatment that are on offer in Nabi Ilyas.

== Bibliography ==
- Conder, C.R.; Kitchener, H.H. (1882). The Survey of Western Palestine: Memoirs of the Topography, Orography, Hydrography, and Archaeology. Vol. 2. London: Committee of the Palestine Exploration Fund.
- Dauphin, C. (1998). La Palestine byzantine, Peuplement et Populations. BAR International Series 726 (in French). Vol. III : Catalogue. Oxford: Archeopress. ISBN 0-860549-05-4.
- Government of Jordan, Department of Statistics (1964). First Census of Population and Housing. Volume I: Final Tables; General Characteristics of the Population (PDF).
- Government of Palestine, Department of Statistics (1945). Village Statistics, April, 1945.
- Hadawi, S. (1970). Village Statistics of 1945: A Classification of Land and Area ownership in Palestine. Palestine Liberation Organization Research Centre.
- Hütteroth, W.-D.; Abdulfattah, K. (1977). Historical Geography of Palestine, Transjordan and Southern Syria in the Late 16th Century. Erlanger Geographische Arbeiten, Sonderband 5. Erlangen, Germany: Vorstand der Fränkischen Geographischen Gesellschaft. ISBN 3-920405-41-2.
- Palmer, E.H. (1881). The Survey of Western Palestine: Arabic and English Name Lists Collected During the Survey by Lieutenants Conder and Kitchener, R. E. Transliterated and Explained by E.H. Palmer. Committee of the Palestine Exploration Fund.
