= Alfei Menashe =

Israeli settlement in the West Bank

Alfei Menashe: אַלְפֵי מְנַשֶׁה; ألفي منشيه
- Local council (from 1987)

Hebrew transcription(s)
  - ISO 259: ʔalpei Mnašše
  - Also spelled: Alfe Menashe (official)
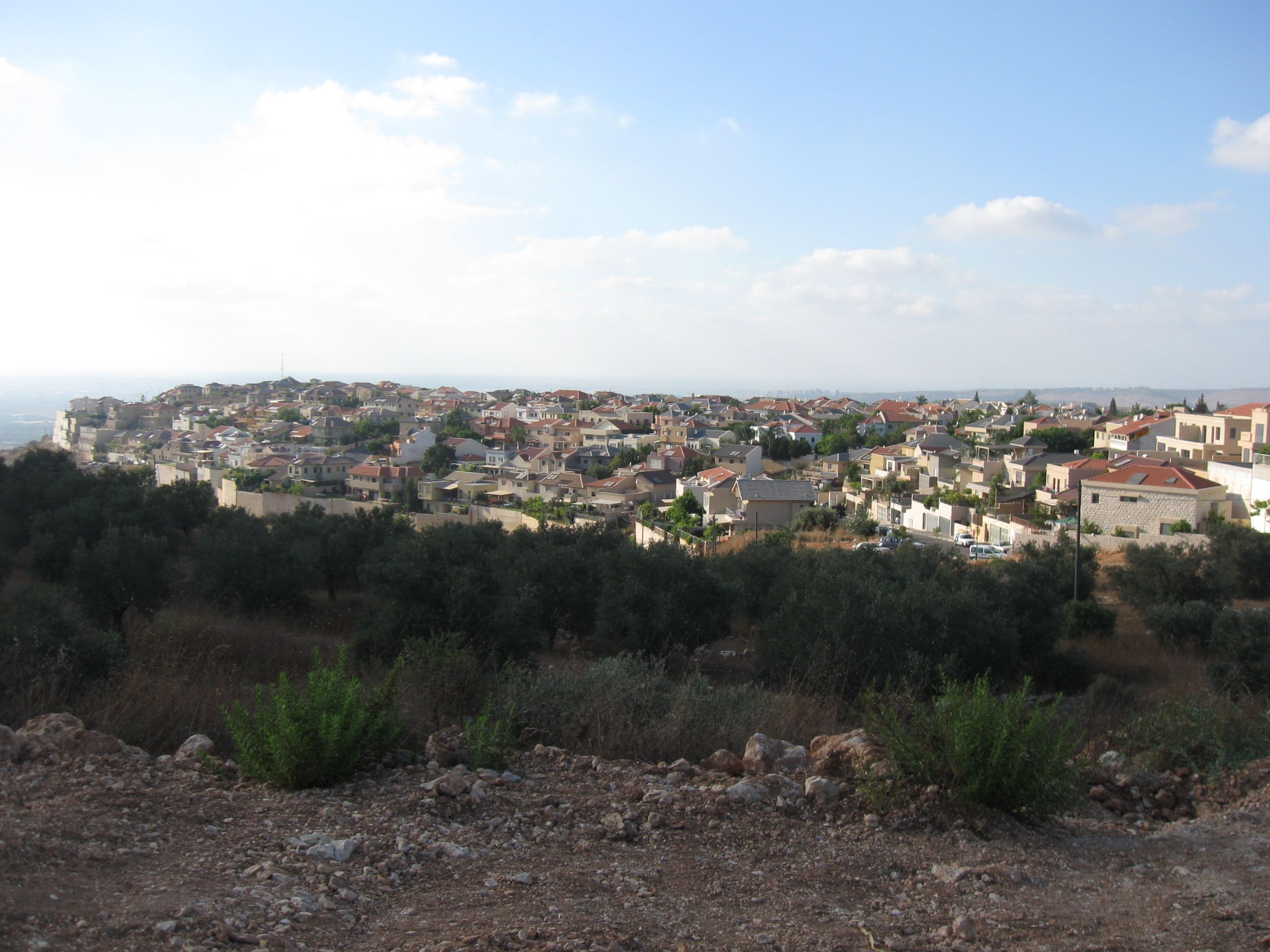
- Interactive map of Alfei Menashe
- Location within the Northern West Bank
- Country: Israel
- Region: West Bank
- District: Judea and Samaria Area
- Founded: 1983

Government
  - Head of Municipality: Shy Rosenzweig

Area
  - Total: 4,616 dunams (4.616 km^{2}; 1.782 sq mi)

Population (2024)
  - Total: 8,038
  - Density: 1,741/km^{2} (4,510/sq mi)
- Name meaning: Thousands of the tribe of Manasseh

Alfei Menashe (Hebrew: אַלְפֵי מְנַשֶׁה, Arabic: ألفي منشيه, lit. Thousands of Manasseh) is an Israeli settlement on the western edge of the central West Bank. Built over land confiscated from the nearby Palestinian villages of Nabi Ilyas, Islah, and Ras Atiya, it is located in the so-called seam zone of the West Bank. Its name is taken from the bible (Deuteronomy 33:17). It was granted local council status in 1987. In 2024 its population was 8,038.

The international community considers Israeli settlements in the West Bank illegal under international law, but the Israeli government disputes this.

== History ==
According to ARIJ, Israel confiscated land from several Palestinian villages in order to construct Alfei Menashe:

- 1,943 dunums of land (43.8% of the total village lands) was taken from Nabi Ilyas,
- 651 dunums of land were taken from ‘Arab Abu Farda,
- 131 dunums of land were taken from Islah,
- 51 dunes were taken from Ras Atiya.

The town's proximity to the Green Line (less than 2 kilometres (1.2 mi) east) and its similar proximity to the Palestinian Arab town of Qalqilyah has made its inclusion on the Israeli side of the West Bank barrier controversial, especially as the looping nature of the barrier's path forms a quasi-enclave of some Palestinian villages to its south. In September 2005, Israel's Supreme Court ruled that the government must consider re-routing the barrier in this area. Work was begun in the summer of 2009 to construct a new route for the barrier, which will no longer incorporate the Palestinian village of Ras al-Tira (and several other villages) on the Israeli side. The work was finished in 2011. (source: Google Earth)

The settlement is the hometown of Israel's most successful mixed martial artist Noad Lahat.

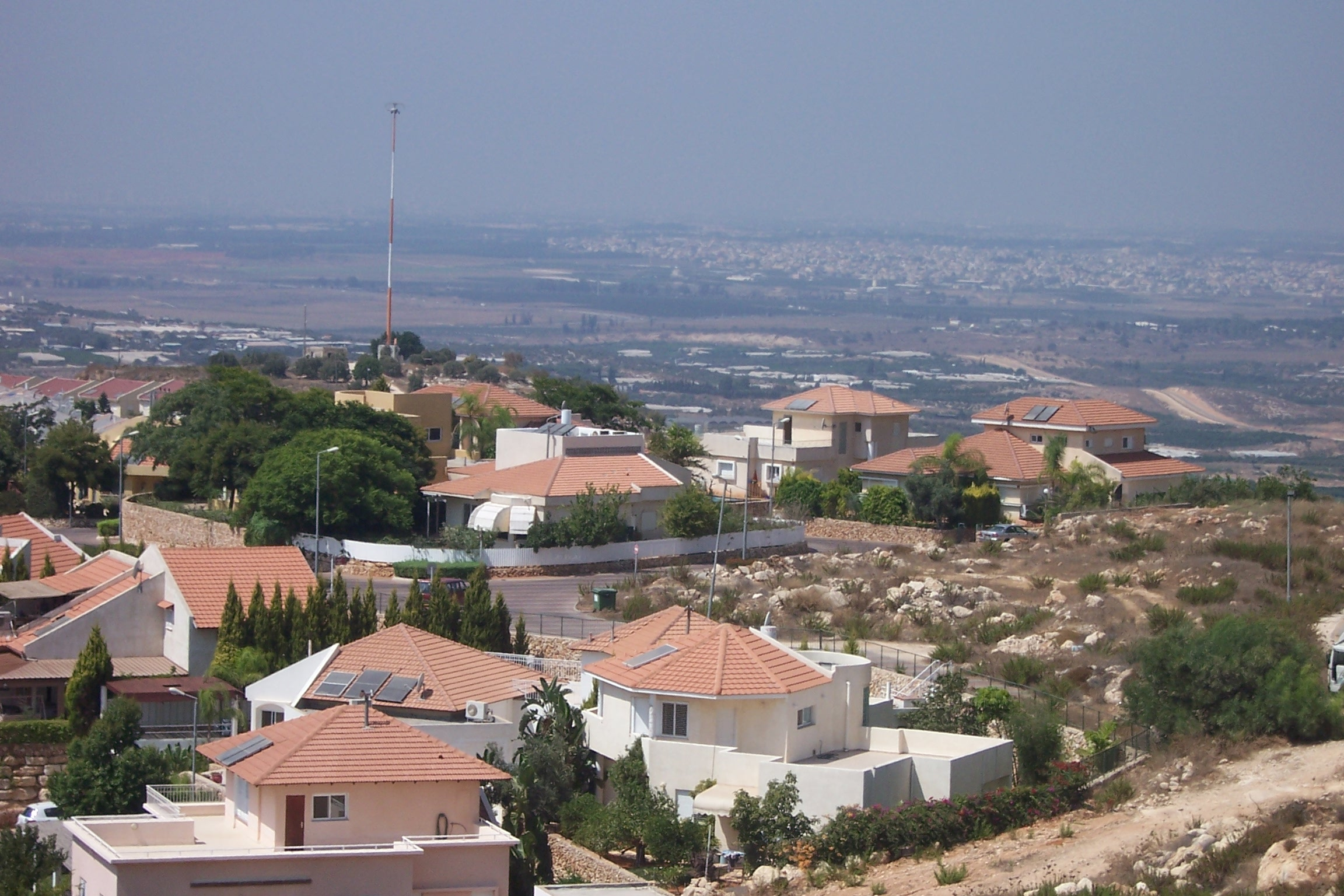
View from high point of Alfei Menashe, showing the nearness of the separation barrier (right) as of 2006

== Voting Patterns ==
In the 2022 election, 52 percent of voters in Alfei Menashe voted for the parties of the center-left coalition led by Yair Lapid, while 45 percent voted for the parties of the right-wing coalition led by Benjamin Netanyahu and 0.1 percent voted for the Arab parties.

In the 2026 election, 53 percent of voters in Bat Hefer voted for the parties of the center-left coalition led by Gadi Eisenkot, while 38 percent voted for the parties of the right-wing coalition led by Benjamin Netanyahu and 0.1 percent voted for the Arab parties. An additional 5.4 percent voted for the Reservists, and 2.7 percent voted for Amcha Yisrael. Voter turnout increased 11 percent from the 2022 election.
