= Azzun =

Palestinian town in Qalqilya, State of Palestine

- Municipality type B

Arabic transcription(s)
  - Arabic: عزّون
  - Latin: 'Azzoun (official); Azon (unofficial)
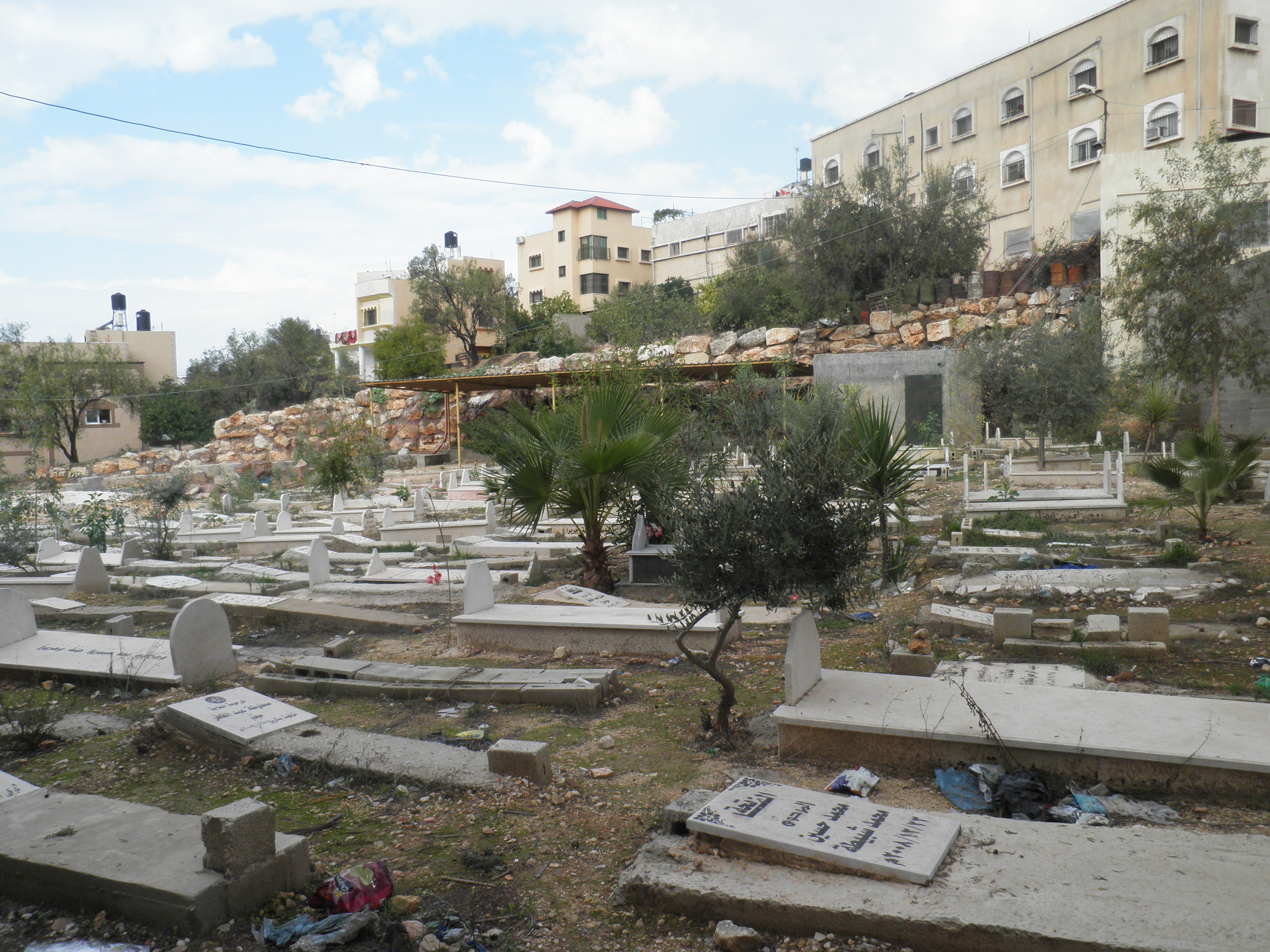
- Azzun

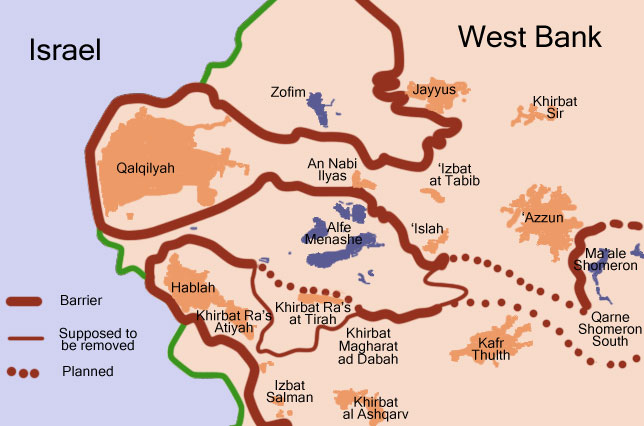
- Map of path of the separation barrier around the Qalqilya and Hableh-Ras Atiya enclaves and the proposed path around Azzun

- Location of Azzun within Palestine
- Coordinates: 32°10′35″N 35°03′34″E
- Palestine grid: 155/175
- State: State of Palestine
- Governorate: Qalqilya

Government
  - Type: Municipality
  - Head of Municipality: Ahmed Abdullah Umran Shanarah

Area
  - Total: 9.1 km^{2} (3.5 sq mi)

Population (2017)
  - Total: 9,269
  - Density: 1,000/km^{2} (2,600/sq mi)
- Name meaning: Azzun, personal name

Azzun (also spelled Azzoun) (عزّون, from the root word عز ′izz which means honor or esteem) is a Palestinian town in Qalqilya Governorate in the northern West Bank, located 9 kilometers east of Qalqilya and 24 kilometers south of Tulkarm.

According to the Palestinian Central Bureau of Statistics census, Azzun had a population of 9,269 in 2017. The vast majority of the inhabitants are Muslim, with a very small Christian minority.

== Location ==
Azzun is located 7–9 km west of Qalqiliya. It is bordered by Kafr Laqif and Wadi Qana to the east, Kafr Thulth to the south, An Nabi Elyas to the west, and Jayyus and Khirbet Sir to the north.

== History ==
Modern Azzun was established in the 17th or 18th century by the Bani Sa'b tribe. The modern village is situated on a strategically advantageous strong point that overlooks a crossroads. Ancient findings from both the Hellenistic and Roman periods were found at the site, including the epitaph of a third-century CE Roman veteran.

Several kilometers north of the village are a number of ancient dry stone towers. PEF visited in 1873 and reported six or seven such towers, the best-preserved of them had six courses standing, and part of the roof. The locals stated that they were ancient vineyard towers. The towers were surveyed by the Israel Archaeological Survey in 1967–1968, and one of them was excavated in the 1970s on behalf of the Society for the Archaeological Survey of Israel. The excavation uncovered Hellenistic and early Roman period pottery as well as a single ribbed fragment that may date to the Byzantine period.

=== Ottoman era ===
Azzun was a site of battle - part of Napoleon Bonaparte's campaign in Ottoman Syria. An Arab poet, Ibrahim Touqan was quoted as saying, "by means of Azzun, how soaked [in] the blood [of] Franks [in the] mother valley."

When the French army marched into Palestine under the command of Napoleon in February 1799, it faced powerful and unexpected resistance from the inhabitants of Jabal Nablus under the command of their local leaders. They attacked the French army while it was marching towards Acre, especially near the valley of Azzun, taking part in the battle of Tal-Tabur. The participation of the inhabitants and local leaders of Nablus in the struggle against Napoleon reflected a territorial sense in resistance to a foreign army.

Ihsan al-Nimr wrote that “the truth is that [Bonaparte’s] morale was weakened around Jabal Nablus, in the valley of Azzun, Qaqun, and al-Marj ... he headed for Acre with disappointment and without determination”. Sheikh Yussuf Jarrar wrote a poem asking the inhabitants, especially the prominent families of Jabal Nablus, to march towards Acre in order to fight the French.

In Doumani's words, the poet exposes “the cohesiveness of this reign’s social formation and the shared sense of identity among its inhabitants versus the factionalism of multiple territorially based centers of power... The most striking aspect of this poem is what it does not say. Not once in its twenty-one verses does it mention Ottoman rule, much less the need to protect the empire or the glory and honor of serving the sultan.” Pierre Jacotin called the village Hazoun on his map in 1799 from the same campaign.

In 1838, the American scholar Edward Robinson noted Azzun as a village in the Beni Sa'ab district, west of Nablus.

In 1852 Robinson visited the village, which he described as having 290 males, all Muslim except for one family of Christians. The Christians originated from the area of Nablus, and came to the village to trade and work.

In 1882, the PEF's Survey of Western Palestine described Azzun as a "small village lying low on the hill-side, with several wells and olives on every side."

In the 1860s, the Ottoman authorities granted the village an agricultural plot of land called Ghabat 'Azzun in the former confines of the Forest of Arsur (Ar. Al-Ghaba) in the coastal plain, west of the village. This detached parcel of woodland became the nucleus for Tabsur (Khirbat 'Azzun), founded by 'Azzuni families.

=== British Mandate era ===
In the 1922 census of Palestine conducted by the British Mandate authorities, Azzun had a population of 700; 691 Muslims and 9 Christians, increasing in the 1931 census to 994: 980 Muslim and 14 Christians in a total of 218 houses.

In the 1945 statistics, the population of Azzun together with Nabi Ilyas and Islah was 1,190; 1,170 Muslims and 20 Christians. Residents owned 23,496 dunams of land, according to an official land and population survey. Of this, 5,494 dunams were for plantations and irrigable land and 1,420 were used for cereals, while 55 dunams were built-up (urban) land.

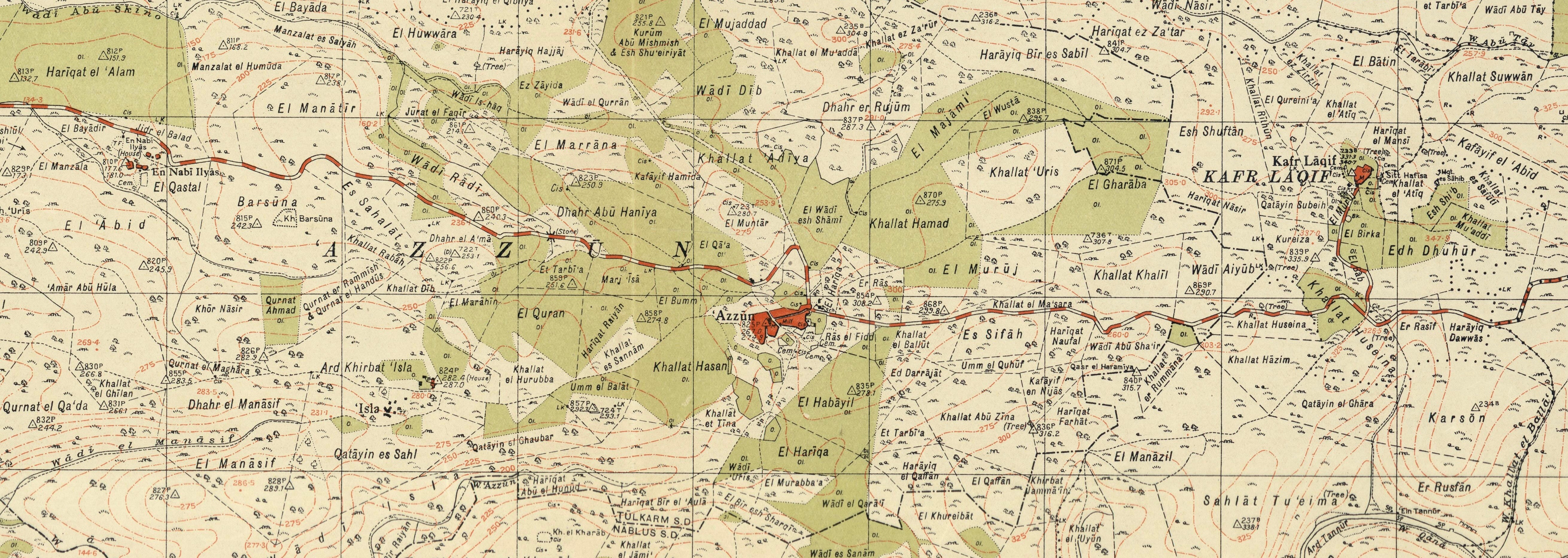
Azzun 1943 1:20,000

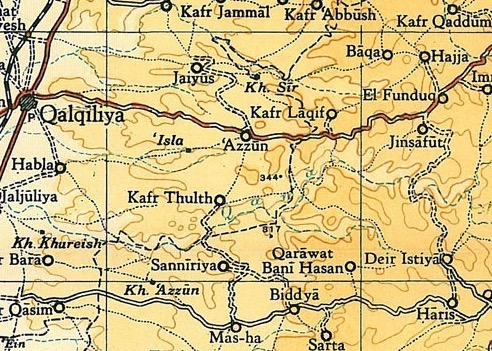
Azzun 1945 1:250,000

=== Jordanian era ===
In the wake of the 1948 Arab–Israeli War, and after the 1949 Armistice Agreements, Azzun came under Jordanian rule. It was annexed by Jordan in 1950.

The Jordanian census of 1961 found 2,096 inhabitants in Azzun.

=== 1967 and aftermath ===
Since the Six-Day War, Azzun has been under Israeli occupation. After the 1995 accords, about 24.7% of the land was classified as Area B, the remaining 75.3% as Area C. Israel has expropriated 268 dunums of village land for the construction of the Israeli settlement of Ma'ale Shomron.

In 1996 a municipal council was established to administer Azzun's civil affairs. The council has eleven members appointed by the Palestinian government. In 2012, the villages of Islah and Izbat al-Tabib were merged into the municipality of Azzun upon decree of the Palestinian Ministry of Local Government.

In 2008, the town's unemployment rate was 19%. In 2012, it had increased sharply to 39%.

Today, the town consists of 9,130 dunams of which 1,209 dunams is built-up area. There are four mosques located in the town. Most of the population works in agriculture and herding (40%) or trade and handicrafts (41%), while the 19% work in public sectors.

As of 2018, Azzun was reported to be the village "with highest number of child arrests in the West Bank per capita."

== Demography ==
=== Local origins ===
The major families of Azzun are the ‘Adwan, Badwan, Radwan, Salim, Hussein, Sweidan, Zamari (or Zummary), Abu Hanniya, Odah, Hawashah, Tabib, Suleiman, Radi, Mas’ud and Abu Dayyah.

Residents of Azzun originally came from the south Hebron Mountain and from Ramallah.

== Bibliography ==
- al-Nimr, Ihsan, (1938–1975): Tarikh Jabal Nablus wa-l-Balqaʼ [History of Mount Nablus and al-Balqa’] (Nablus: Matbaʻat jamiʻat ʻummal al-matabiʻ al-taʻawuniyya),
- Barron, J.B., ed. (1923). Palestine: Report and General Abstracts of the Census of 1922. Government of Palestine.
- Conder, C.R.; Kitchener, H.H. (1882). The Survey of Western Palestine: Memoirs of the Topography, Orography, Hydrography, and Archaeology. Vol. 2. London: Committee of the Palestine Exploration Fund.
- Doumani, B. (1995). Rediscovering Palestine, Merchants and Peasants in Jabal Nablus, 1700–1900. University of California Press.
- Government of Jordan, Department of Statistics (1964). First Census of Population and Housing. Volume I: Final Tables; General Characteristics of the Population (PDF).
- Government of Palestine, Department of Statistics (1945). Village Statistics, April, 1945.
- Hadawi, S. (1970). Village Statistics of 1945: A Classification of Land and Area ownership in Palestine. Palestine Liberation Organization Research Centre.
- Hütteroth, W.-D.; Abdulfattah, K. (1977). Historical Geography of Palestine, Transjordan, and Southern Syria in the Late 16th Century. Erlanger Geographische Arbeiten, Sonderband 5. Erlangen, Germany: Vorstand der Fränkischen Geographischen Gesellschaft. ISBN 3-920405-41-2.
- Karmon, Y. (1960). "An Analysis of Jacotin's Map of Palestine" (PDF). Israel Exploration Journal. 10 (3, 4): 155–173, 244–253. Archived from the original (PDF) on 2019-12-22.
- Mills, E., ed. (1932). Census of Palestine 1931. Population of Villages, Towns and Administrative Areas. Jerusalem: Government of Palestine.
- Palmer, E.H. (1881). The Survey of Western Palestine: Arabic and English Name Lists Collected during the Survey by Lieutenants Conder and Kitchener, R. E. Transliterated and Explained by E.H. Palmer. Committee of the Palestine Exploration Fund.
- Robinson, E.; Smith, E. (1841). Biblical Researches in Palestine, Mount Sinai, and Arabia Petraea: A Journal of Travels in the Year 1838. Vol. 3. Boston: Crocker & Brewster.
- Robinson, E.; Smith, E. (1856). Later Biblical Researches in Palestine and Adjacent Regions: A Journal of Travels in the Year 1852. London: John Murray.
