= Ras Atiya =

- Municipality type D (Village council)

Arabic transcription(s)
  - Arabic: رأس عطيّه خربة رأس عطيّه
  - Latin: Ras Atiya (official); Khirbat Ras Atiya (unofficial)
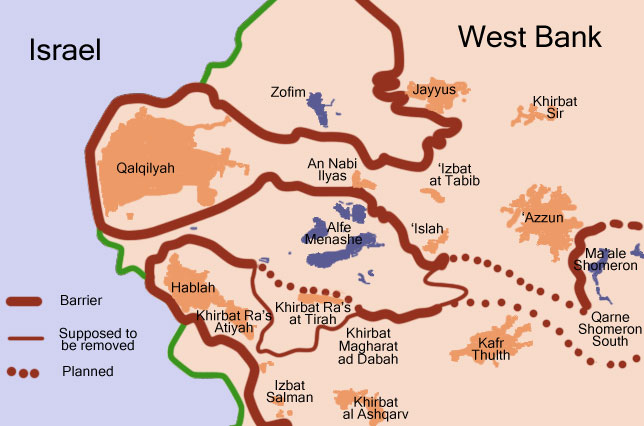
- Map of the path of the separation barrier around the Qalqilya and Hableh-Ras Atiya enclaves

- Location of Ras Atiya within Palestine
- Coordinates: 32°09′31.32″N 34°59′26.89″E
- Palestine grid: 149/174
- State: State of Palestine
- Governorate: Qalqilya

Government
  - Type: Village council

Population (2017)
  - Total: 2,129
- Name meaning: Râs ’Atîyeh: "The hill-top of ’Ata"; Kh. Ras et Tireh: "The ruin of the hill-top of the fort of Tireh"

Ras Atiya (Arabic: رأس عطيّه; Hebrew: ראס עטיה) is a Palestinian town in the Qalqilya Governorate in the western area of the West Bank, located 27 km south of Tulkarm and 11 km south of Qalqiliya. According to the Palestinian Central Bureau of Statistics, the village had a population of 2,129 inhabitants in 2017.

== Location ==
Ras ‘Atiya (including Ras at Tira and Wadi ar Rasha) is located 4-5 km south of Qalqiliya. It is bordered by ‘Izbat al Ashqar to the east, Ad Dab’a to the east and south, ‘Izbat Jalud and Al Mudawwar to the south, Habla to the west, and An Nabi Elyas and ‘Arab Abu Farda to the north.

== History ==
In 1882, the PEF's Survey of Western Palestine found at Kh. Ras et Tireh: "walls and cisterns."

=== Jordanian era ===
In the wake of the 1948 Arab–Israeli War, and after the 1949 Armistice Agreements, the area came under Jordanian rule.

In 1961, the population was 224.

=== Post-1967 ===
After the Six-Day War in 1967, the area has been under Israeli occupation.

After the 1995 accords, 32.2% of Ras 'Atiya land is defined as Area B, while the remainder 67.8% is Area C. Under the same accord, 5% of Ras al-Tira land is defined as Area B, while the remainder 95% is Area C, while 100% of Wadi ar Rasha land is Area C,

Israel has confiscated 51 dunams of land from Ras at Tira in order to construct the Israeli settlement of Alfei Menashe.

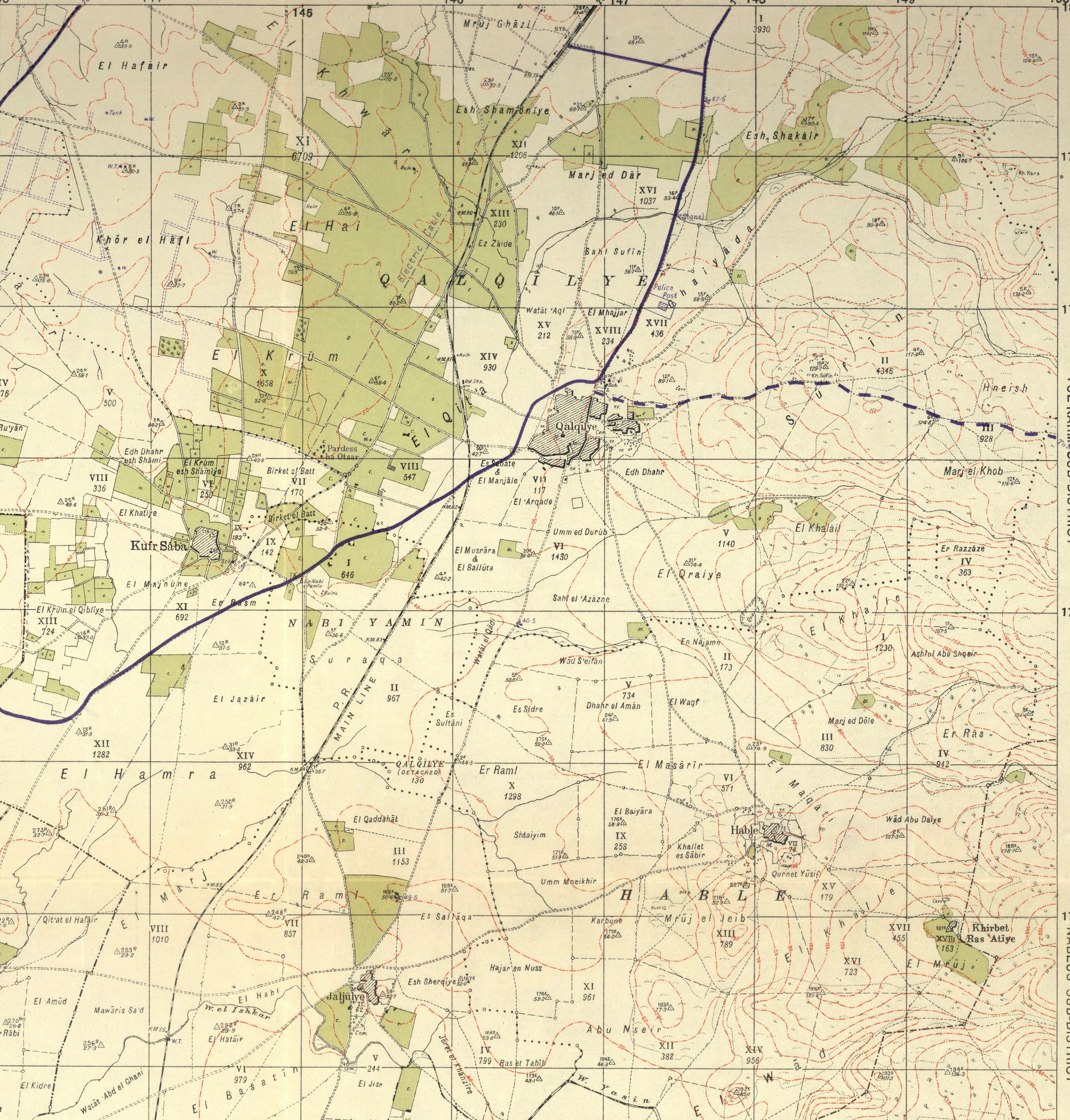
Ras Atiya (Khirbet Ras 'Atiye) 1942 1:20,000 (bottom right)

== Bibliography ==
- Conder, C.R.; Kitchener, H.H. (1882). The Survey of Western Palestine: Memoirs of the Topography, Orography, Hydrography, and Archaeology. Vol. 2. London: Committee of the Palestine Exploration Fund.
- Government of Jordan, Department of Statistics (1964). First Census of Population and Housing. Volume I: Final Tables; General Characteristics of the Population (PDF).
- Palmer, E.H. (1881). The Survey of Western Palestine: Arabic and English Name Lists Collected During the Survey by Lieutenants Conder and Kitchener, R. E. Transliterated and Explained by E.H. Palmer. Committee of the Palestine Exploration Fund.
