= Hableh =

- Municipality type C

Arabic transcription(s)
  - Arabic: حبله
  - Latin: Hable, Habla, Hablah, Hibla, Hiblah (unofficial)
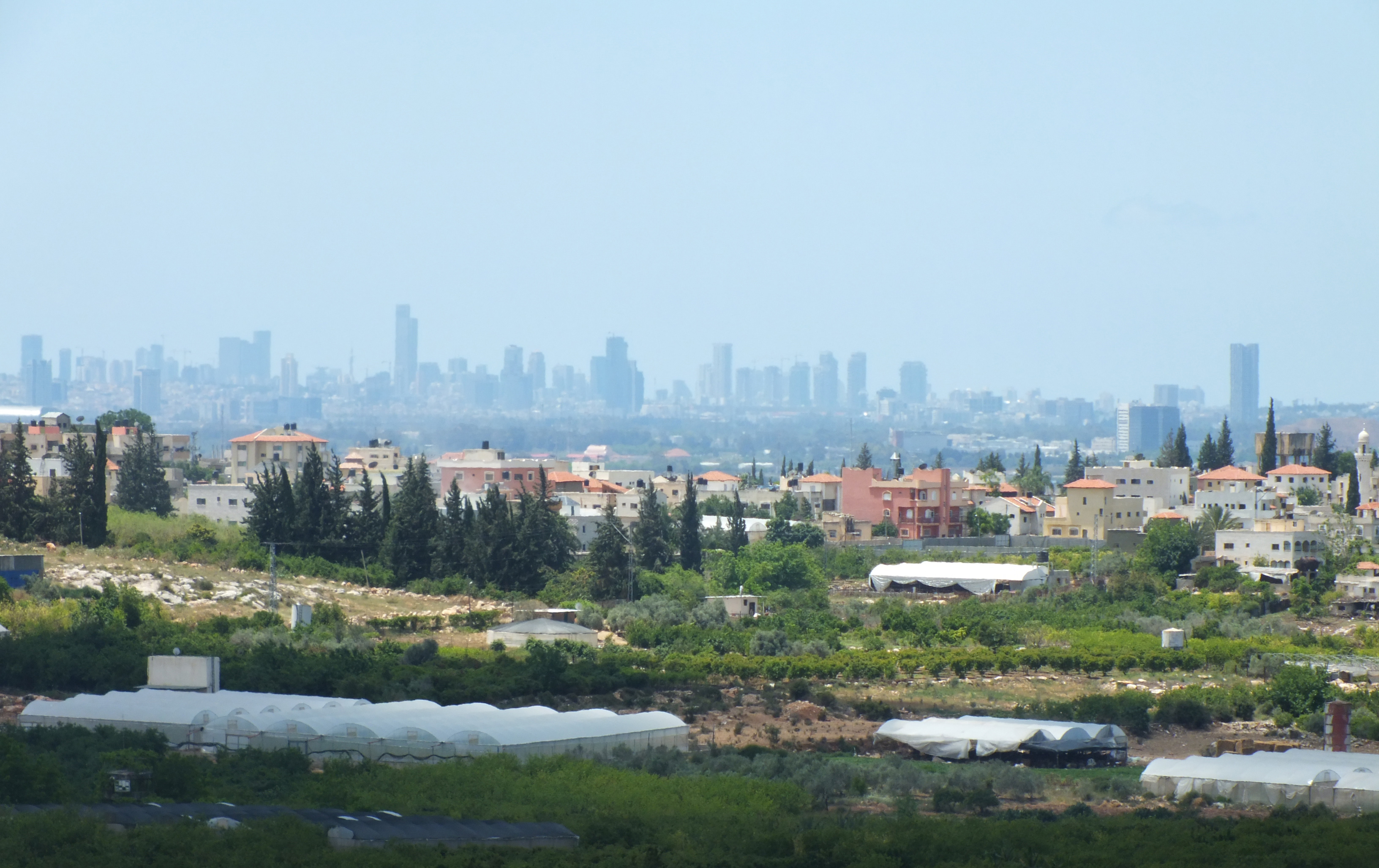
- Hableh, 2013

- Location of Hableh within Palestine
- Coordinates: 32°09′53″N 34°58′38″E
- Palestine grid: 148/174
- State: State of Palestine
- Governorate: Qalqilya

Government
  - Type: Municipality

Area
  - Total: 10.9 km^{2} (4.2 sq mi)
- Elevation: 71–159 m (233–522 ft)

Population (2017)
  - Total: 7,057
  - Density: 647/km^{2} (1,680/sq mi)
- Name meaning: "pregnant"

Hableh (Arabic: حبله, also transliterated Hable, Habla, Hablah, Hibla, Hiblah) is a Palestinian village located in the Qalqilya Governorate of the State of Palestine, in the northwestern West Bank. According to the Palestinian Central Bureau of Statistics (PCBS) census, the town had a population of 7,057 in 2017.

== Location ==
Habla is located just east of the Green Line, about 1-mile (1.6 km) southeast of the Palestinian city of Qalqilya as the crow flies, in the West Bank. It is bordered by Al Mudawwar to the east and south; Ras ‘Atiya and ‘Izbat Jalud to the south, the Green Line to the west, and Qalqiliya, Wadi ar Rasha and Ras at Tira to the north.

== History ==
About a dozen tombs, with loculi have been found, together with cisterns. The type of tombs indicate that they are Christian. Ancient remains of a mosque and houses have been found in the village.

In 1265, Hableh was among the villages and estates sultan Baibars allocated to his amirs after he had expelled the Crusaders. Hableh was divided equally between three of his amirs: Izz al-Din Aydamur al-Zahiri, the na'ib of Al-Karak, Jamal al-Din Aqush, and Shams al-Din Sunqur Jah al-Zahiri.

=== Ottoman era ===
During the period of Ottoman rule over Palestine, Hableh appeared in Ottoman tax registers in 1596, where it is listed as forming part of the nahiya (subdistrict) of Jabal Qubal in the liwa (district) of Nablus. It had a population of 41 Muslim households. The villagers paid a fixed tax rate of 33.3% on various products, such as wheat, barley, summer crops, olive trees, goats and beehives, in addition to "occasional revenues" and a press for olive oil or grape syrup; a total of 3,800 akçe, of which two-thirds went to a waqf (charitable endowment).

Pierre Jacotin listed the village on his map in 1799. In 1838 Hableh was noted as a Muslim village, in the Jurat Merda district, south of Nablus.

Edward Robinson and Eli Smith visited Hableh in the mid-19th century and describe it as being situated along the southern side of a low rocky ridge overlooking a plain on which could be seen the villages of Qalqilya, Kafr Saba, Jaljulia, and Ras al-Ain. Camping on the ground to the south of the village and north of a maqam on a low rocky hill, Robinson and Smith found themselves surrounded by cisterns dug into the rock. Most of these had round openings, some with one or two steps by which one could descend into them to draw water. All appeared to be ancient, and only one was still in use. There was also a sepulcher with an arched vault and an ancient wine press made up of two vats, one shallower and smaller than the other in which grapes would have been trodden with the juice going down through a hole to the larger, deeper vat directly adjacent and slightly below.

Victor Guérin, who visited Hableh in 1870, said it contained 800 inhabitants. A few of the houses and the village mosque were built using large stones of apparent antiquity. He too noted the presence of ancient rock-cut formations around the village.

In 1870/1871 (1288 AH), an Ottoman census listed the village in the nahiya (sub-district) of Jamma'in al-Awwal, subordinate to Nablus.

In 1882, the PEF's Survey of Western Palestine described Hableh as a "village of moderate size, evidently an ancient site, surrounded with cisterns and tombs. The houses are principally of stone. The water supply from cisterns."

=== British Mandate era ===
In the wake of World War I, British military governors were established in Palestine's major cities and the deputy for the governor in Nablus was stationed in Habla. During the British Mandatory period, Hableh formed part of the Tulkarm Subdistrict. In the 1922 census of Palestine conducted by the British Mandate authorities, Hableh had a population of 271, all Muslims, increasing in the 1931 census to 397, still all Muslims, in a total of 86 houses.

By the end of the mandate period, in the 1945 statistics, the population had increased to 580 Muslims. The village lands covered an area of 10,903 dunams: 8,391 of which were owned by Arabs, 570 by Jews, and 1,942 of which were public lands. A total of 28 dunams were for citrus and bananas, 169 dunams for plantations and irrigable land, 6,847 for cereals, while 15 dunams were classified as built-up (urban) areas.

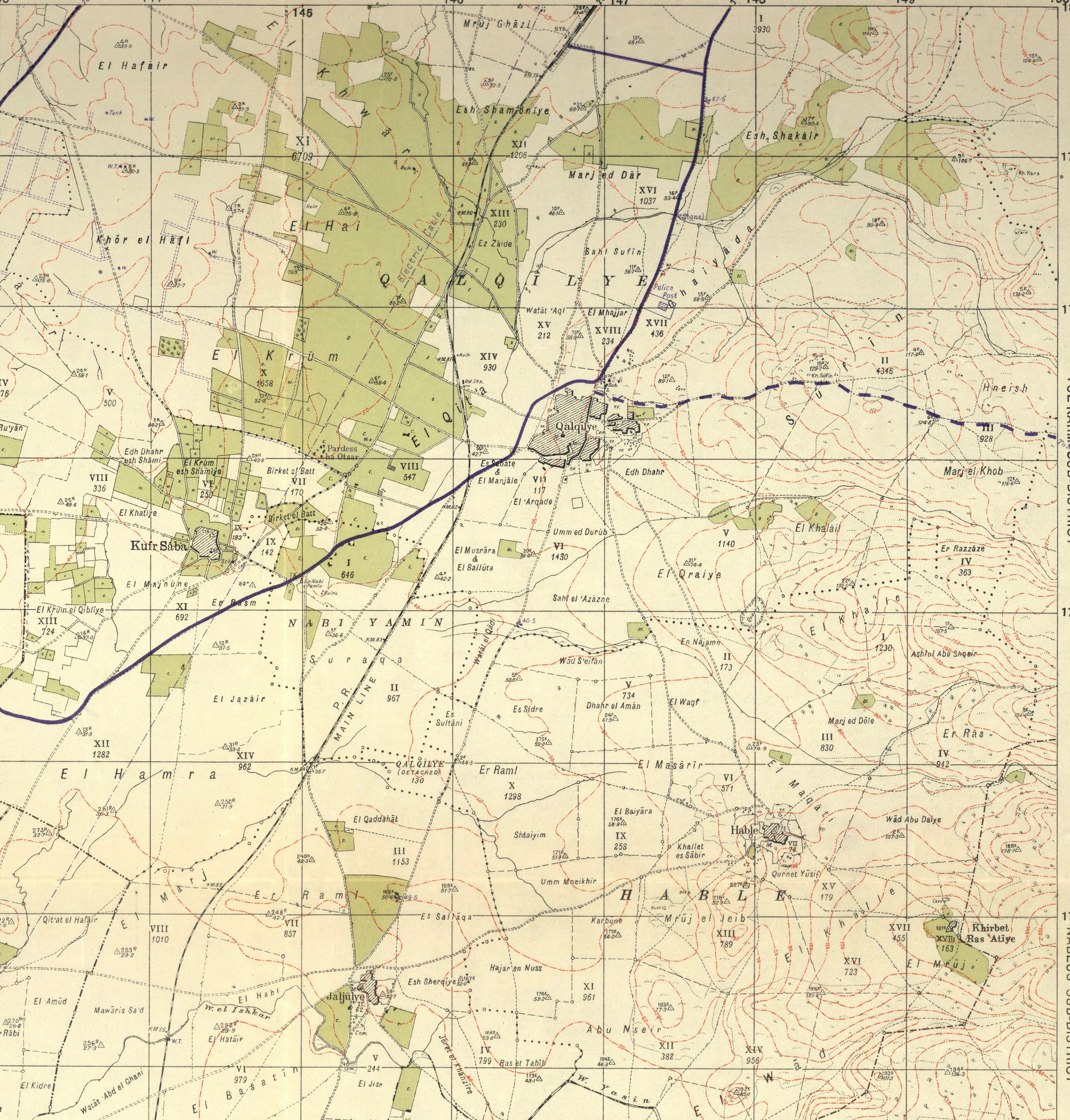
Hableh (Hable) 1942 1:20,000

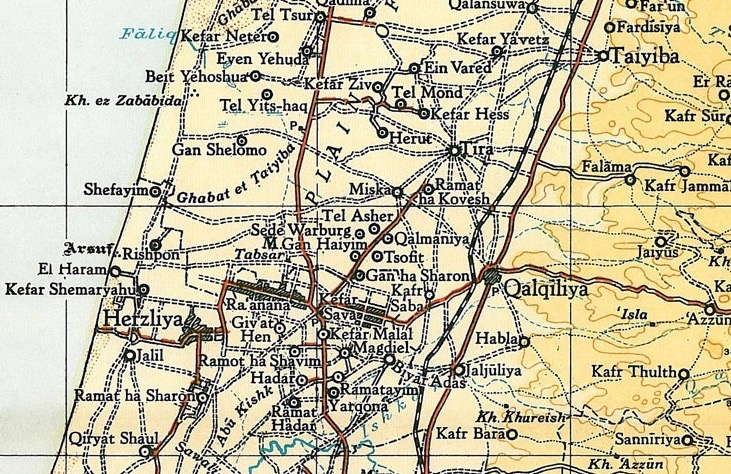
Hableh (Habla) 1945 1:250,000

=== Jordanian era ===
In the wake of the 1948 Arab–Israeli War, and after the 1949 Armistice Agreements, Hableh came under Jordanian rule.

In 1961, the population was 996.

=== Post-1967 ===
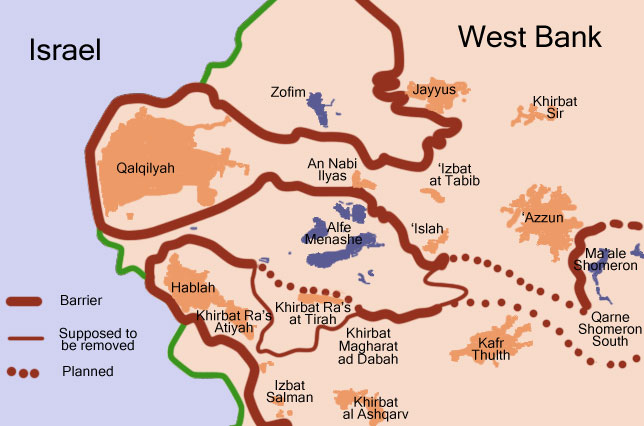
Portion of West Bank showing the path of the separation barrier around the enclaves of Qalqilya and Hableh

Since the Six-Day War in 1967, Hableh came under Israeli occupation.

Inhabitants of Habla were among the 10,000 Palestinians displaced as a result of the 1967 war. According to Nur Masalha, Israeli forces evicted civilians and deliberately destroyed Habla among a number of other villages during the war (such as Imwas, Yalu, Bayt Nuba, Bayt Marsam, Bayt 'Awa, al-Burj, and Jiftlik).

After the 1995 accords, about 21.1% of the village land was classified as Area B, the remaining 78.9% as Area C.

== Separation barrier ==
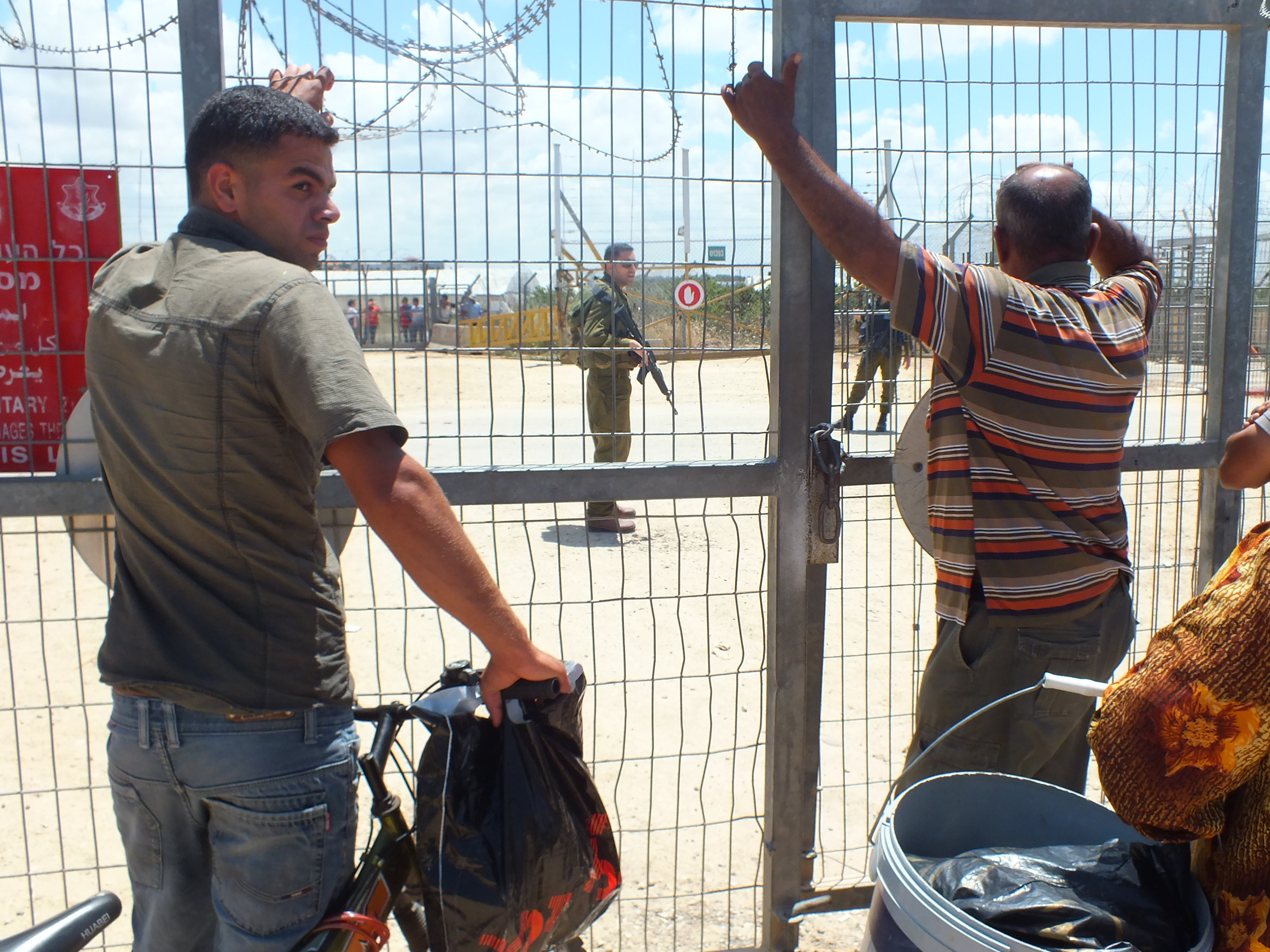
Palestinians wait in groups of five for the Israeli soldiers to allow them through the "agricultural passage".

According to a report in The Jerusalem Times on January 24, 1996, Israeli bulldozers began levelling 1.7 square kilometers (0.66 sq mi) land in Hiblah belonging to its Palestinian residents in order to build an electronic wall that would separate the towns of Tulkarm and Kalkiliya from the Green Line. In February of the same year, it was reported that the security fence being built on Hibla's land would be 22 kilometers (14 mi) long and would separate the village from the Israeli village of Matti.

The construction of the Israeli West Bank barrier to the north of the village in the first decade of the 21st century changed the life of Habla's inhabitants. Palestinian labourers line up every day before 5am at gate no. 1393 in the barbed wire fence surrounding Habla. Manned by soldiers from the Israel Defense Forces (IDF). They wait approximately two hours so as to enter the seam zone, a closed military zone, where they seek to tend to land that they own there or in nearby Qalqilya or to work in these areas as manual labourers.

All those entering the seam zone must have a valid "pass-permit" that allows them to leave and enter for work which is issued by the Israeli military authorities. Those with the proper pass permits who wish to access Qalqilya can drive 12 miles (19 km) around the barrier, through multiple checkpoints. Alternatively, they may use a tunnel that was built in 2004 to connect Habla to Qalqilya.

== Bibliography ==
- Barron, J.B., ed. (1923). Palestine: Report and General Abstracts of the Census of 1922. Government of Palestine.
- Conder, C.R.; Kitchener, H.H. (1882). The Survey of Western Palestine: Memoirs of the Topography, Orography, Hydrography, and Archaeology. Vol. 2. London: Committee of the Palestine Exploration Fund.
- Dauphin, C. (1998). La Palestine byzantine, Peuplement et Populations. BAR International Series 726 (in French). Vol. III : Catalogue. Oxford: Archeopress. ISBN 0-860549-05-4.
- Government of Jordan, Department of Statistics (1964). First Census of Population and Housing. Volume I: Final Tables; General Characteristics of the Population (PDF).
- Government of Palestine, Department of Statistics (1945). Village Statistics, April, 1945.
- Guérin, V. (1875). Description Géographique Historique et Archéologique de la Palestine (in French). Vol. 2: Samarie, pt. 2. Paris: L'Imprimerie Nationale.
- Hadawi, S. (1970). Village Statistics of 1945: A Classification of Land and Area ownership in Palestine. Palestine Liberation Organization Research Center.
- Hütteroth, W.-D.; Abdulfattah, K. (1977). Historical Geography of Palestine, Transjordan and Southern Syria in the Late 16th Century. Erlanger Geographische Arbeiten, Sonderband 5. Erlangen, Germany: Vorstand der Fränkischen Geographischen Gesellschaft. ISBN 3-920405-41-2.
- Ibn al-Furat (1971). Jonathan Riley-Smith (ed.). Ayyubids, Mamluks and Crusaders: Selections from the "Tarikh Al-duwal Wal-muluk" of Ibn Al-Furat : the Text, the Translation. Vol. 2. Translation by Malcolm Cameron Lyons, Ursula Lyons. Cambridge: W. Heffer.
- Karmon, Y. (1960). "An Analysis of Jacotin's Map of Palestine" (PDF). Israel Exploration Journal. 10 (3, 4): 155–173, 244–253. Archived from the original (PDF) on 2018-09-05.
- Masalha, N. (2003). The politics of denial: Israel and the Palestinian refugee problem (Illustrated ed.). Pluto Press (Original from the University of Michigan). ISBN 0-7453-2121-6.
- Masalha, N. (2005). Nur Masalha (ed.). Catastrophe remembered: Palestine, Israel and the internal refugees : essays in memory of Edward W. Said (1935-2003). Zed Books. ISBN 1-84277-623-1.
- Mills, E., ed. (1932). Census of Palestine 1931. Population of Villages, Towns and Administrative Areas. Jerusalem: Government of Palestine.
- Palmer, E.H. (1881). The Survey of Western Palestine: Arabic and English Name Lists Collected During the Survey by Lieutenants Conder and Kitchener, R. E. Transliterated and Explained by E.H. Palmer. Committee of the Palestine Exploration Fund.
- Robinson, E.; Smith, E. (1857). Later Biblical researches in Palestine, and in the adjacent regions: a journal of travels in the year 1852 (2nd ed.). Crocker and Brewster (Original from Harvard University). p. 136. "hableh palestine."
- Robinson, E. (1858). The Bibliotheca sacra and American biblical repository, Volume 10. W.F. Draper.
- The Encyclopædia Britannica: The New Volumes, Constituting, in Combination with the Twenty-nine Volumes of the Eleventh Edition, the Twelfth Edition of that Work, and Also Supplying a New, Distinctive, and Independent Library of Reference Dealing with Events and Developments of the Period 1910 to 1921 Inclusive, Hugh Chisholm. The Encyclopædia Britannica, Company ltd (Original from Oxford University). 1922. ** A wikilink to the article [Palestine] on page 17 in volume 32 of [EB1922] is not available**
