= Timeline of the Israeli–Palestinian conflict in 2026 =

- Timeline of the Israeli–Palestinian conflict
- 2024; 2025; 2026

The following is a list of events during the Israeli–Palestinian conflict in 2026, including the events of the Gaza war.

== January ==
=== 1 January ===
- Israel orders the banning effective 1 March of 37 humanitarian agencies from operating in the Gaza Strip for failing to comply with its revised regulations on the disclosure of detailed information on their Palestinian staff.
- Israeli forces arrested 50 Palestinians and demolished homes following operations involving alleged abuse and property destruction in the West Bank.

=== 4 January ===
- Israeli forces killed three Palestinians in Khan Younis, Gaza.

=== 5 January ===
- The Palestinian embassy in the United Kingdom officially opens in London, following the United Kingdom's diplomatic recognition of Palestine in September 2025.

=== 6 January ===
- An Israeli assault on Birzeit University in the West Bank injures dozens of people.
- In the West Bank, where communications control is still in effect, Israel approves the expansion of 4G mobile services for Palestinians.

=== 7 January ===
- Israeli forces killed two Palestinians in Gaza.
- Israeli forces killed two people in Southern Lebanon.
- The United Nations accused Israel of apartheid in the West Bank and calling Israel to end the apartheid system.

=== 8 January ===
- Israeli forces killed an eleven-year-old Palestinian girl in Jabalia refugee camp in Gaza.
- Spanish Prime Minister Pedro Sanchez said he is open to sending peacekeeping troops to Palestine.
- Somalia accuses Israel of planning a relocation of Palestinians to Somaliland.
- Israeli strikes killed at least thirteen people, including at least four children, in Gaza.
- One person was killed in an Israeli drone strike in southern Lebanon.

=== 9 January ===
- Israeli forces killed at least three people in an overnight strike in Gaza.

=== 10 January ===
- Israeli settlers beat a 67-year-old deaf Palestinian man in Deir Sharaf, as settler violence forces entire Palestinian communities to flee from their homes.

=== 11 January ===
- Israeli forces killed a Palestinian in Hebron during raids in the West Bank.
- A Palestinian baby dies of hypothermia in Gaza.
- Israeli forces kill one person in southern Lebanon.

=== 12 January ===
- Three Palestinians were killed by an Israeli quadcopter drone in Khan Younis.
- CSF leader Hussam Al-Astal claims responsibility for killing a senior Hamas police officer in Khan Younis, Gaza.

=== 13 January ===
- At least five people die in Gaza from collapsed buildings and extreme cold.

=== 14 January ===
- The United States announces the second phase of the Gaza ceasefire plan.

=== 15 January ===
- Israeli strikes kill ten people in Gaza, including a minor, along with Hamas and Palestinian Islamic Jihad commanders.
- It is announced that Palestinian President Mahmoud Abbas will meet Russian President Vladimir Putin during a visit to Moscow on 21 January.

=== 16 January ===
- The Palestinian committee that will govern Gaza under U.S. supervision holds its initial meeting in Cairo.
- The IDF kills a Palestinian child near a mosque after Friday prayers in Al-Mughayyir, Ramallah, West Bank.

=== 19 January ===
- Three Palestinians were killed in Gaza, and others were injured.

=== 20 January ===
- A 3-month-old baby dies of hypothermia in Daraj Quarter, in Gaza City.
- Israel bulldozes UNRWA headquarters in East Jerusalem, despite the United Nations' condemnation.

=== 21 January ===
- Israeli strikes in Gaza killed at least 11 people, including two children, three journalists and a woman. The IDF claimed one of the strikes targeted suspects who were operating a drone that posed a threat.
- The IDF carried out airstrikes on the Syria–Lebanon border, which Israel said were targeted at sites used to smuggle weapons to Hezbollah, killing two people.
- The Minister of National Security Itamar Ben-Gvir approved gun licences for 18 illegal settlements in the West Bank in order to "enhance self-defence and increase personal security".

=== 22 January ===
- US President Donald Trump launches the Board of Peace in Davos, Switzerland.
- It is announce that the Rafah Border Crossing will fully resume operations next week, according to the National Committee for the Administration of Gaza.
- Russian President Vladimir Putin holds talks with American envoys and Palestinian President Mahmoud Abbas in Moscow.
- The IDF announces that a soldier died from wounds sustained during fighting in southern Gaza in October 2025.

=== 26 January ===
- The IDF announced that the remains of the final Israeli hostage, Ran Gvili, was recovered in Gaza.

=== 28 January ===
- Israeli settlers set fire to Palestinian property in Khallat al-Sidra, a Bedouin community northeast of East Jerusalem, with Israeli forces stormed the area shortly after the attack.

=== 31 January ===
- Israeli forces launched several airstrikes into the Gaza Strip, killing at least 32 people, including seven children and injuring at least 30 others. One of the strikes targeted a police station in Sheikh Radwan, where seven people were killed, including four female police officers. The IDF claimed that the strikes targeted several commanders of Hamas and the Palestinian Islamic Jihad, as well as a weapons depot, an arms manufacturing site and two rocket launching positions, which was considered as a "violation of the ceasefire agreement".

== February ==
=== 3 February ===
- A 24-year-old Palestinian man named Saeed Nael Saeed al-Sheikh was killed by Israeli forces and injuring three others in Jericho. According to the IDF, the incident was a response after several Palestinians threw rocks at the soldiers during a raid in the city.

=== 10 February ===
- Two Palestinians were killed by an Israeli drone strike while cycling in eastern Deir al-Balah near the ceasefire line, according to the Al-Aqsa Martyrs Hospital.

=== 12 February ===
- The Commission of Detainees and Ex-Detainees Affairs and the Palestinian Prisoners' Society announced that a Palestinian paramedic, Hatem Ismail Rayyan, who was arrested by Israeli forces at Kamal Adwan Hospital in Gaza on 27 December 2024, was pronounced dead under Israeli custody.

=== 13 February ===
- Several Palestinians were injured after Israeli settlers attacked farmers near Talfit before Israeli forces fired tear gas and live ammunition at residents who tried to stop the settler attack. Israeli settlers also destroyed about 300 Palestinian olive trees near Turmus Ayya.

=== 18 February ===
- Palestinian-American teenager Nasrallah Abu Siyam was shot dead by Israeli settlers in the West Bank village of Mukhmas, making him the second Palestinian-American to have been killed by settlers in less than a year. The settlers also attacked a farmer and injured several other Palestinians. A funeral for Abu Siyam was held the following day.

=== 23 February ===
- The Ministry of Religious Affairs of the Palestinian Authority reported that the Abu Bakr Al-Siddiq Mosque in Tell, Nablus was vandalized by Israeli settlers, spray-painted with offensive phrases insulting the prophet Muhammad, words "revenge" and "price tag" as well as setting the mosque on fire.

=== 27 February ===
- Israeli drones targeted a police checkpoint at the al-Maslakh intersection in Al-Mawasi, killing four people and injuring several others. That same day, an Israeli drone targeted another police post near the entrance of the Bureij refugee camp, killing two people.

== March ==
=== 8 March ===
- Two Palestinians were killed in an attack by Israeli settlers in Khirbet Abu Falah and another resident later died from fumes of a tear gas canister fired by Israeli soldiers who accompanied the settlers to disperse the residents. All three of them were later buried in a joint funeral.

=== 12 March ===
- A mosque in the village of Duma was vandalised and attempted to set on fire by Israeli settlers.

=== 14 March ===
- A 28-year-old man named Amir Moatasem Odeh was killed while two others were injured by Israeli settlers in the Palestinian village of Qusra.
- Wafa reported that five Palestinians were injured after Israeli settlers attacked them in Rashayda, near the village of Kisan after "firing live ammunition" as well as stealing a hundred sheep.
- Israeli police opened fire on the Bani Odeh family, a Palestinian family in the West Bank, after a Ramadan shopping trip through Tammun, killing the parents and two of their children. Two of their other children were also injured. Israeli police later stated that "a vehicle accelerated toward the forces, which felt endangered and opened fire."

=== 15 March ===
- The IDF announced that the military targeted several Hamas operatives, including two who were involved in the October 7 attacks, stating that the gunmen were preparing to carry out an attack on Israeli forces in Gaza.
- A senior police official and eight others were killed by an Israeli airstrike in Zawayda and 14 others were injured. That same day, an Israeli airstrike targeted western Nuseirat, killing a man, his pregnant wife and his son, according to health officials. A 15-year-old child in the refugee camp also later died after taken to Al-Awda Hospital.

=== 26 March ===
- A Palestinian man was killed by Israeli settlers in Tayasir.

=== 28 March ===
- Israeli forces launched several airstrikes into the Gaza Strip, killing one in Khan Yunis and two more in Shuja'iyya, according to health officials.

=== 31 March ===
- Four Palestinians were injured after Israeli settlers attacked the village of Tayasir.

== April ==
=== 1 April ===
- Palestinians in the West Bank staged demonstrations and strikes to protest against the Death Penalty for Terrorists Law that was passed by the Knesset.

=== 6 April ===
- A 54-year-old driver from the World Health Organization (WHO) was killed and several others injured after Israeli forces opened fire on their vehicle near the Yellow Line in eastern Khan Yunis. In response, the WHO suspended medical evacuations from Gaza to Egypt.

=== 8 April ===
- Al Jazeera Mubasher journalist, Mohammed Wishah, was killed by an Israeli drone while driving his vehicle to the Bureij refugee camp.
- A Palestinian man was killed by an Israeli settler while trying to defend a greenhouse from a settler attack in Tayasir.
- Palestinian media outlets reported that a woman in Burin and two men in Einabus were attacked by Israeli settlers.

=== 9 April ===
- A Palestinian female student was killed by Israeli fire while attending class in a tent in Beit Lahia.
- The Israeli advocacy organization, Peace Now, reported that the Israeli government had approved of establishing dozens of new settlements in the West Bank.
- The IDF announced that two militants, a member of the Mujahideen Brigades and a member of the Nukhba forces were killed by Israeli forces in southern and northern Gaza respectively after planning "imminent" attacks against the soldiers.

=== 11 April ===
- A Palestinian man was killed during a raid by Israeli settlers in Deir Jarir.
- At least seven Palestinians were killed and several others were injured by Israeli strikes in central and southern Gaza.

=== 21 April ===
- A 16-year-old Palestinian boy named Mohammad Majdi al-Jaabri was killed by a vehicle in an Israeli security convoy which was en route to secure Minister of Settlements Orit Strook in Hebron. Her office later denied involvement of the incident, stating that it "was not the minister's and the minister was not at the scene" and the boy had "crossed a red light", causing the crash. Israel Police stated that an investigation was opened into the incident.
- Two Palestinians, including a teenage boy, were killed by Israeli soldiers in Al-Mughayyir, Ramallah during a settler raid in the village.

=== 22 April ===
- A 25-year-old Palestinian man was killed during a raid by Israeli settlers in Deir Dibwan, Ramallah.
- Two Palestinians, including a 14-year-old boy, were killed by Israeli settlers during a settler attack in Al-Mughayyir in the Ramallah and al-Bireh Governorate.
- Five Palestinians, including three children, were killed by an Israeli drone strike near a mosque in Beit Lahia.

=== 23 April ===
- Wafa reported that a 15-year-old boy died from his injuries after Israeli forces shot him during a raid in Nablus.

=== 24 April ===
- Al Jazeera reported that 12 Palestinians in Beit Lahia, Khan Yunis and Gaza City were killed by Israeli attacks despite the ceasefire.

=== 25 April ===
- Health officials reported that four Palestinians, one in Al-Mughraqa, two in Gaza City and one in Khan Yunis, were killed by Israeli forces despite the ceasefire.
- Several Israeli settlers raided the village of Duma, injuring a woman and a child.

=== 28 April ===
- A 9-year-old boy was killed by an Israeli drone strike in Khan Yunis, with the IDF stated that it targeted an individual who posed a threat to Israeli troops by approaching the Yellow Line, despite no evidence. That same day, four Palestinians were killed after an Israeli airstrike targeted a vehicle in Gaza City.

=== 29 April ===
- The Palestinian Ministry of Health announced that a 37-year-old Palestinian man was killed in a raid in Silwad by Israeli forces.
- A 16-year-old Palestinian boy was killed during a raid in the Al-Hawooz area in Hebron after Israeli troops shot him in the abdomen, causing him to be injured before pronounced dead in hospital.

== May ==
=== 3 May ===
- A Palestinian man was killed and four others, including a child, were injured by Israeli forces during a raid in Nablus. The IDF stated that the incident was a response to a confrontation which several "terrorists" threw rocks toward soldiers.

=== 8 May ===
- Dozens of Israeli settlers launched several raids in the village of Khirbet Shuweika, Hebron, setting cars and houses on fire as well as attacking a Palestinian child.
- NPR reported that Israeli settlers forced a Palestinian family to exhume the body of a Palestinian man and removed his body from the cemetery in Asasa, south of Jenin.

=== 15 May ===
- A 16-year-old Palestinian boy was killed by Israeli forces in Al-Lubban ash-Sharqiya in the Nablus Governorate.
- Israeli settlers vandalized a mosque and two vehicles in the village of Jibiya, Ramallah.

=== 16 May ===
- A 34-year-old Palestinian man was killed by Israeli forces in the Jenin refugee camp. The Israeli military claimed that the man attempted to "infiltrate" the camp where "the soldiers are operating, and the entry is prohibited".
- Izz al-Din al-Haddad, the leader and commander of the Al-Qassam Brigades was killed by an Israeli airstrike in an apartment in Gaza City along with his wife and daughter.

=== 17 May ===
- Eight Palestinians were killed by Israeli attacks in several locations throughout the Gaza Strip, including three community kitchen workers in Deir Al-Balah. The IDF also announced that Bahaa Baroud, a Hamas commander in the group's operations division, was also killed by an Israeli airstrike.
- Five Palestinians were attacked and damaged residents' property by Israeli settlers near Marah Rabah and Beit Fajjar.

=== 19 May ===
- Multiple Israeli settlers destroyed and vandalized several gravestones in the villages of Kisan and Rashaydeh in the West Bank.

=== 26 May ===
- Mohammed Odeh, commander of the Al-Qassam Brigades, was killed by an Israeli airstrike alongside his wife and his two children in Gaza City.

=== 27 May ===
- Local hospitals in Gaza reported that at least 10 Palestinians, including five children were killed and five others were injured in an Israeli strike in Gaza City. The casualties included local Hamas battalion commander Imad Asleem, who was also killed along with his daughter.

=== 28 May ===
- Israeli Prime Minister Benjamin Netanyahu announced that he directed the Israeli military to increase Israeli control of the Gaza Strip to 70% of the territory.
- Hamas warned that following the increase of Israeli airstrikes, the ceasefire is at the risk of collapse.

=== 30 May ===
- Several Israeli settlers attacked the village of Madama, Nablus, injuring seven Palestinians.

== June ==
=== 5 June ===
- The Israeli military opened fire at a Palestinian family's vehicle in Tel Rumeida, killing a seven-month-old child, Sam Fahed Abu Haykal and injuring both of his parents. The IDF stated that the soldiers fired "single shots toward the vehicle" after perceiving "a vehicle accelerating toward them" and expressed "deep sorrow for any harm caused to uninvolved individuals."

=== 6 June ===
- Nine Palestinians, including a local councilman, were injured during an Israeli settler rampage in Huwara.

=== 10 June ===
- Amnesty International released a report, accusing Israel of carrying out an "ethnic-cleansing" campaign against Bedouin communities in the West Bank.

=== 11 June ===
- Alice Froussard, a journalist for Radio France Internationale, was denied entry to Israel to work in the West Bank for her coverage of the West Bank and Gaza that was critical of Israel's actions and accused her of supporting Hamas, according to the Minister of Diaspora Affairs and Combating Antisemitism, Amichai Chikli.

=== 14 June ===
- A 3-year-old Palestinian child named Rayan Abu al-Ajeen was killed by Israeli forces on his family's farm in Wadi as-Salqa in central Gaza. According to his family, al-Ajeen and his father were targeted after walking to a safe area for civilians near the Yellow Line and fired "warning shots" at them by Israeli soldiers.
- A mosque and a car in Burqa, Ramallah were vandalized and damaged by Israeli settlers.

=== 17 June ===
- A mosque in Jiljilyya and another in Mazari an-Nubani were both set on fire and vandalized by Israeli settlers from the Hilltop Youth.

=== 22 June ===
- Two Palestinians, including a child, were killed by the IDF during a raid in Beit Ummar. The IDF stated that the incident was a response after both of them allegedly threw Molotov cocktails at Karmei Tzur, an Israeli settlement. Their bodies were later confiscated by Israeli forces.

=== 25 June ===
- A Palestinian man was killed while asleep in his bedroom during an IDF raid in Salfit.
- One person was killed by Israeli gunfire in Al-Atatra, Beit Lahia and a drone strike targeted a group of people near the Italian Complex in Nassr, Gaza City, injuring two people.

=== 29 June ===
- A 15-year-old Palestinian boy was killed by Israeli soldiers during a raid in Umm al-Sharayit, Al-Bireh.
- Israeli human rights organisation, B'Tselem, published a report that 1,086 Palestinians were killed in the West Bank and almost a quarter of them were children and teenagers, the highest rate of child fatalities since 1967, according to the organisation.

== July ==
=== 2 July ===
- The Security Cabinet of Israel approved a plan to build 13 new settlements in the Mateh Binyamin Regional Council.

=== 7 July ===
- Seven Palestinians, including a child, were killed by Israeli attacks. According to medical officials, a Palestinian man was killed and two children were injured by an airstrike in Al-Mawasi, with the IDF claimed that the target was a Hamas militant. Another Israeli attack targeted a tent for displaced families in western Gaza City, killing one and injuring five others and in Khan Yunis, one person was killed and three others were injured by an Israeli attack. According to the Popular Resistance Committees, one of the senior leaders, Waheed Abu Salem, was killed by an Israeli airstrike in Khan Yunis.
- The public relations director of the Egyptian Committee for Aid to Gaza, Mohammed al-Wahidi, along with two others, were killed by an Israeli airstrike in Gaza City.

=== 8 July ===
- United States representative Ro Khanna and his group were detained by Israeli forces during his visit in the West Bank, before being released by the IDF ninety minutes later after contacting the United States embassy and the Israel Police.

=== 11 July ===
- A group journalists including from CNN were attacked by Israeli settlers while reporting near Sinjil in the West Bank on the anniversary of the killing of Sayfollah Musallet. Four Israeli settlers were later arrested by Israel Police for the attack.
- A 17-year-old Palestinian boy, Fadi Hamdallah al-Nassan was shot by Israeli forces during an attack by Israeli settlers in Al-Mughayyir, Ramallah before eventually died from his injuries a week later on 18 July.

=== 13 July ===
- A 19-year-old Palestinian man was killed by Israeli soldiers near the separation wall in Bir Nabala.
- Three Palestinians were killed and 15 others were injured by Israeli attacks in Gaza City.

=== 14 July ===
- Eight people, including six police officers and a woman, were killed at a police station at the Jabalia refugee camp by an Israeli drone. The IDF later stated that four of the officers were members of Hamas' Jabalia battalion, to which, head of the Jabalia police force, Colonel Mohammad Marwan Salem, was said to be the leader of the battalion.
- A 10-year-old boy was killed by Israel forces in Rafah.
- Finance Minister Bezalel Smotrich announced that Israel's security cabinet approved a budget of $434 million to build 34 new settlements in the West Bank.

=== 15 July ===
- Three members of a family were killed by Israeli forces in central Gaza.
- A tent in Khan Yunis was destroyed by an Israeli attack, killing one person.

=== 17 July ===
- The IDF announced that a sniper from the Palestinian Islamic Jihad and a Hamas militant in group's operation's division were killed by Israeli forces in central and northern Gaza respectively.
- The Israel Police announced that five Palestinians were arrested for allegedly attacking Israeli settlers near Ma'ale Tidhar, an illegal outpost in the West Bank.

=== 18 July ===
- IDF Major general Tamir Yadai said that Israel now controlled 65% of Gaza, more than the 53% agreed upon under the ceasefire agreement brokered by Donald Trump.

=== 20 July ===
- 2 Palestinian men were shot dead by Israeli forces in Deir Jarir during a settler attack on the village, according to the Palestinian health ministry. According to Haaretz, the IDF said that it raided the village to "prevent friction" during the settler attack, and that the opened fire after "terrorists threw stones".

=== 21 July ===
- A family of six, including four children, were killed after Israeli forces launched a strike on their home in Sabra, Gaza City.
- Israeli settlers launched overnight arson attacks in Turmus Ayya and Jalud.

=== 24 July ===
- Four Palestinians and two Israeli soldiers were killed during a clash in the West Bank town of Tal. According to one of the villagers, he stated that the clashes began after 20 Israeli settlers from a nearby settlement entered the village. The IDF stated that Israeli forces arrived to the village after Israeli hikers were attacked in the area, which was under Palestinian Authority, and the soldiers opened fire at the villagers as a response after "terrorists stole the weapon" from a security guard. Local leader of Fatah, Essam Saifi, told to Reuters that dozens of Israeli settlers attacked the town and attempted to break in two of the houses there.

=== 26 July ===
- A mosque in Qusra and another in Kour were vandalized and set on fire by Israeli settlers. The attack came after a clash when Israeli settlers attacked Palestinian villagers in Tell, Nablus on 24 July that killed four Palestinians and two Israeli soldiers.

=== 27 July ===
- A letter signed by 600 former security figures and diplomats warns President Trump against Jewish terrorism, the protection and immunity provided to them by the Netanyahu government, and the suppression of the Palestinian Authority, citing the serious repercussions on American interests, the region, and the Gaza peace plan.
- An UNRWA-run vocational training centre in the Qalandia Camp was raided by the IDF and later detained its staff members as well as firing tear gas and stun grenades at them.

=== 28 July ===
- An Israeli airstrike targeted the Al-Muttaqin Mosque in Gaza City, killing one and injuring more than 12 people. The IDF said that Hamas used the mosque as a weapons storage facility.

=== 31 July ===
- Hamas announced that the group agreed to end the war that included provisions of disarmament and the withdrawal of Israeli forces from the Gaza Strip.
- At least eleven Palestinians, including four children, were injured after Israeli settlers and IDF soldiers raided the Junaid neighbourhood in Nablus.

== August ==
=== 1 August ===
- Seven Palestinians were killed by Israeli attacks, including five in multiple areas in Gaza City, one in Deir al-Balah and one on a tent in Al-Mawasi, Rafah.
- Warehouses that stored medical supplies and medicines belonging to the Al-Aqsa Martyrs Hospital were destroyed by an Israeli airstrike.
- Seven Palestinians, including two children, were detained by the IDF during raids in the Tubas, Nablus and Hebron governorates.

=== 2 August ===
- At least 19 Palestinians, including women and children, were killed by Israeli attacks in multiple locations in the Gaza Strip.
- Six Israelis were arrested by Israel Police after attacking and spitting on the St. James Monastery in the Armenian Quarter.

=== 4 August ===
- Prime Minister Netanyahu stated that Israel will not withdraw from the Gaza Strip until the complete disarmament of Hamas.

=== 5 August ===
- Several Palestinians were detained by Israeli forces after the IDF launched a raid in the Qalandiya refugee camp.
- A group of Israeli settlers vandalized and set multiple Palestinian homes on fire in the village of Tuba.

=== 6 August ===
- The United Arab Emirates, Qatar, Jordan, Indonesia, Pakistan, Turkey, Saudi Arabia and Egypt issued a joint statement, condemning Israel's violations of targeting of healthcare facilities and the killing of Palestinian civilians in the Gaza Strip.

=== 7 August ===
- Two Palestinian paramedics were injured in the village of Abu Njeim after Israeli settlers vandalized their ambulance and attacked them with pepper spray.

=== 8 August ===
- Two Palestinians were wounded after Israeli settlers attacked them in Beit Furik.

=== 9 August ===
- The Israel Prison Service confirmed the death of Ihab Mohammed Abdel Qader Diab, who was detained by Israeli forces on 12 December 2023 and died in prison on 18 September 2024, increasing the number of deaths under Israeli detention since 7 October 2023 to 91.
- The Israeli military ordered the closure of the Palestinian town of Taybeh, Ramallah to prevent attacks on Palestinians by Israeli settlers.
- Prime Minister Benjamin Netanyahu rejected the US-led 15-point peace plan, stating that Israeli forces will not withdraw from the Gaza Strip until the disarmament of Hamas.
- Israeli settlers surrounded several Palestinian homes in the Ras Al-Ain area in Qusra, marking the beginning of a siege in the village.

=== 14 August ===
- The Israel Defense Forces announce that Al-Qassam Brigades commander Muhammad Bassam Mushtaha, who was accused of taking hostages during and after the Hamas–led attacks against Israel on October 7, was killed in a recent airstrike last month in northern Gaza.

=== 15 August ===
- Two Palestinians, including a nurse, were injured during an attack by Israeli settlers in Sa'ir.

=== 16 August ===
- The IDF issued statements to residents of Qusra to leave the village and their properties during a military operation to remove Israeli settlers from the besieged village.

=== 18 August ===
- A cafe in Gaza City was targeted by an Israeli strike, killing at least six Palestinians and injuring 14 others.

=== 19 August ===
- The Gaza Governorate Municipalities Police Headquarters in Gaza City was targeted by Israeli airstrikes, killing at least nine people, including the head of Women's Police Department, Colonel Faten al-Sahhar and injuring 15 others.
- An Israeli strike targeted the Nuseirat refugee camp, killing one person.
- The IDF announced that a platoon commander of Al-Qassam Brigades, Sobhi Sami Mahmoud Shahthout, who also participated in the October 7 attacks was killed in central Gaza.

=== 20 August ===
- The United Kingdom, France, Canada, Italy and Germany issued a joint condemnation on Israel's plan to build 1,200 Israeli settlement homes in the West Bank, calling the decision as "unaaceptable" and stated that Israel must "retract the plans immediately".

=== 21 August ===
- The IDF said that it captured a Hamas militant in central Gaza after attempting to cross the Israeli-controlled area in the Gaza Strip.
- A 17-year old Palestinian boy was killed and an elderly man was injured by Israeli settlers in Sa'ir after allegedly threw rocks at the settlers.
- A Palestinian man was killed by Israeli forces during a raid in Jenin and his body was taken by the IDF after the operation.

=== 23 August ===
- An Israeli attack targeted a warehouse in Az-Zawayda, killing a four-year-old boy and injuring six others. That same day, two Palestinians were killed in separate Israeli attacks on Salah al-Din Road.

=== 24 August ===
- Israeli forces launched attacks in the Gaza Strip, killing five Palestinians, including two children, a 10-year-old girl by Israeli gunfire in a tent in Khan Yunis and a four-year-old boy by an airstrike in the Bureij refugee camp.

=== 28 August ===
- Three Hamas-linked militants were killed in an Israeli airstrike on their vehicle in Jenin, West Bank.
- Five Palestinians were killed by Israeli strikes in multiple areas in the Gaza Strip.

=== 29 August ===
- A news team from NBC News and a Palestinian woman were attacked by masked Israeli settlers during an interview in Jalud, Nablus.
- Dozens of Israeli settlers attacked the village of Qusra before Israeli soldiers deployed to the village and removed the settlers from the villagers' homes.
- British activist, Finn Joughin, was attacked and detained by Israeli settlers in Umm al-Khair, Hebron after attempted to protect Palestinian residents' property. Joughin was later handed over to Israel Police and stated that he was arrested "on suspicion of performing an indecent act against a minor". Israeli authorities ordered for Joughin's deportation from Israel on 31 August.
- The IDF announced that two members of the Nukhba forces were killed by an Israeli strike in Khan Yunis.
- The IDF announced that a Hamas commander was killed by an Israeli strike while "hiding within the compound" in the Al-Aqsa Martyrs Hospital. The hospital stated that at least three people were injured after an Israeli strike targeted near the hospital's warehouse.
- An Israeli drone targeted the Tel al-Hawa neighbourhood in Gaza City, killing two Palestinians and injuring several others. One person in Khan Yunis and another in Al-Musaddar were also killed by the Israeli military.

=== 30 August ===
- Four Palestinians were injured by Israeli forces after confronting Israeli settlers who entered Al-Mughayyir, Ramallah and attacked the residents' vehicles.
- An Israeli drone strike targeted a bakery in Deir al-Balah, killing two Palestinians, one of them was a three-year-old child. The IDF stated that the attack targeted a Hamas militant.

=== 31 August ===
- An elderly Palestinian couple were injured after attacked Israeli settlers launched a raid in Burqa, Ramallah.

== September ==
=== 1 September ===
- A mosque in Bazzaryah was set on fire and vandalized by a group of Israeli settlers.
- Israeli forces fired tear gas at worshippers at a mosque in Madama, Nablus, causing suffocation by several worshippers and disruption of prayers.
- Four Palestinians, including two children, were killed and eight others were injured by an Israeli drone in the Al-Kateeba District in Gaza City.
- Israeli Prime Minister Benjamin Netanyahu announced that the head of Hamas's internal security apparatus in Gaza, Muein al-Arabid, was arrested by the IDF in Gaza City.

=== 2 September ===
- Two Palestinian teenagers were killed by IDF soldiers during an armed settler raid in Al-Mughayyir, Ramallah. The IDF stated that the army enter the village to provide security to police officers and an Israeli civilian to retrieve livestock.

=== 3 September ===
- One person was killed by an Israeli drone strike in Rimal and two more, including a 13-year-old child, were killed after Israeli forces opened fire at Palestinians in Beit Lahia.

=== 4 September ===
- A Palestinian man was killed by Israel Police officers near Damascus Gate in Jerusalem. Israel Police later stated that his killing was an attempt to "neutralise" him, claiming that the man was attempting to stab them.

=== 6 September ===
- Prime Minister Benjamin Netanyahu announced the removal and evacuation of several unauthorised outposts in the West Bank amid pressure from the United States to crackdown Israeli settler attacks against Palestinians.
- Two Israelis were arrested by Israel Police after suspected of involvement in attacks in Qusra.

=== 7 September ===
- Omar al-Toubasi, a Palestinian dentistry student was killed and three others were injured by Israeli settlers during a raid in Hajjah, Palestine.

=== 10 September ===
- A Palestinian man, his wife and his two daughters were killed by an Israeli airstrike in northern Gaza. The IDF later stated the target of the attack was Muamen Ahmed, an operative who taken part in combat against Israeli forces.

== October ==
=== 23 October ===
- Two IDF soldiers of the Home Front Command were shot dead by militants in an attack at Yehuda Junction near Hebron.
