= 2026 escalation of Israeli settler violence =

Conflict in the West Bank

- Part of the Israeli–Palestinian conflict
- Date: July 24, 2026
- Location: West Bank
- Caused by: Killing of two Israelis during a settler raid in Tell, Nablus
- Methods: Shootings; assault; arson; protests; vandalism

Parties
Israel Defense Forces; West Bank Israeli settlers	West Bank Palestinians

Casualties and losses
1 soldier killed 1 security coordinator killed 4 wounded	4 killed 10+ wounded 2 captured 70+ detained

On 24 July 2026, tensions escalated in the West Bank after a group of Israeli settlers raided the Palestinian town of Tell, Nablus, leading to a confrontation with locals. During the incident, Israeli security personnel from the nearby settlement of Havat Gilad arrived at the scene. One of the personnel was confronted by a Palestinian who then snatched his weapon, leading to a shootout that left four Palestinians and two Israelis dead. The clash prompted an escalated Israeli military campaign in the area, including a raid on a Nablus hospital that resulted in the capture of two of the perpetrators of the shooting. It also sparked a wave of settler violence against several villages in the area.

== Background ==
Since the outbreak of the Middle Eastern crisis following the 7 October attacks in 2023, there has been a surge in Israeli settler violence and the establishment of settlements. According to the United Nations, 1,114 Palestinians have been killed in the West Bank since 7 October, mainly by Israeli forces. The Palestinian health ministry said that the incident in Tell rose the total number of Palestinians killed by Israeli violence in the West Bank in 2026 to 87, while the UN has reported that around 850 Palestinians were injured in settler attacks in the same time frame. Additionally, 41 Israelis have been killed in the West Bank since October 2023.

The incident occurred amid an escalation of violence in the area. The day prior, two Palestinians were killed by Israeli soldiers in Beit Furik, and two others were killed days earlier in Deir Jarir. Additionally, within the preceding hours of the incident, a settler was stabbed near Elon Moreh, and another person was stabbed in the northern West Bank. The perpetrators of both attacks were killed.

== Tell shootout ==
On 24 July, at around 8:30 a.m., dozens of Israeli settlers, including armed men, entered the Palestinian town of Tell, Nablus. According to local Fatah representative Essam Saifi, the group consisted of 25 to 30 people. The settlers claimed that they were hiking, although the area they entered was in the Palestinian Authority-controlled Area A of the West Bank, which is prohibited to Israelis without prior coordination with the military. A group of dozens of locals confronted the settlers near a mosque. Saifi said that the settlers had attacked two homes in the eastern part of the town when locals confronted them, after which the settlers fired shots. They returned half an hour later to the western part of the city, where they attacked a minor. By then, the civil defense team from the nearby settlement of Havat Gilad, along with Israeli artillery soldiers stationed nearby, were deployed to the scene.

After the settlers arrived again, one of them fired into the air. Two Palestinians then confronted one of the armed settlers, 32-year-old civil defense squad member Benayahu Mellet, who threatened them with his weapon. One Palestinian, identified as Farouq Ramadan, then seized his weapon and opened fire; Mellet, on the ground, took out a handgun, and around a dozen gunshots were subsequently fired. Mellet and Israel Defense Forces (IDF) artillery commander Maj. Yuval Ezra were fatally shot, and two Israelis were injured, one critically and another seriously. A platoon commander who was stationed at the scene opened fire, killing four Palestinians, including the gunman, and injuring four others, three critically. The four deceased Palestinians were two brothers and their cousins, and aside from Farouq, were named as Ibrahim, Jawad, and Imrad. CNN analyzed a video of the incident and reported that it showed an altercation that escalated. CNN also reported that the IDF acknowledged the killing of the Israelis had not been planned in advance.

== Subsequent events ==
=== 24 July ===
Following the incident, a security assessment was held between Israeli prime minister Benjamin Netanyahu, defense minister Israel Katz, and IDF chief Eyal Zamir. Later, Netanyahu and Katz jointly announced that the IDF would demolish the attacker's home, launch operations in villages described as "hotbeds of terror", reinforce IDF positions across the West Bank, create new checkpoints, and hasten the authorization and creation of Israeli outposts. The IDF deployed five companies to the West Bank after the attack, along with imposing a security corridor around Tell and Nablus, shutting down all checkpoints leading to Tell. At the site, roadblocks were set up as the IDF searched for additional suspects. A curfew was imposed on Tell, Bureij, and the Israeli settlement of Shilo. The IDF said that it was preparing for an "extensive counterterrorism operational activity" in the area, and IDF central command chief Avi Bluth said that the IDF was conducting counterterrorism operations "to prevent the area from spiraling into further violence".

In the afternoon, the IDF and Shin Bet announced that two wounded Palestinians who participated in the Tell shooting were captured during a raid on a hospital in Nablus, adding that the identities of the remaining perpetrators were known. The operation was carried out by the Duvdevan Unit with intelligence from the Shin Bet. The men were then taken into custody for further questioning. According to Nablus governor Ghassan Daghlas, the hospital raided was the Nablus Specialty Hospital.

Additionally, hundreds of settlers conducted reprisal attacks against five towns near Nablus after the incident, including Fara'ata, Immatain, Jit, Iraq Burin, as well as the Hebron village of Masafer Yatta. In Far'ata, settlers set several buildings and vehicles afire and attacked residents, while also uprooting an olive field and graffitiing the word "revenge" on walls. According to the Palestine Red Crescent Society, eight Palestinians were injured, six from gunshots. Two more Palestinians were injured by rubber bullets in Surra, where around 70 settlers had raided the village, setting six homes, five vehicles, and several acres of farmland afire. Dozens of settlers raided Jit and Iraq Burin, while a driver was stabbed by settlers near Ma'ararjat in the Jordan Valley. Israeli protestors also blocked the neighborhood of At-Tur, East Jerusalem, leading to their dispersal by Israeli police. Hundreds of trees were uprooted by a bulldozer in Madama, and a 30-year-old Palestinian was beaten in Awarta.

=== 25 July ===
The IDF conducted raids in several parts of the West Bank, detaining at least 70 people. In Tell, the primary focus of the raid, the mayor said that around 70 people were detained for questioning, with the IDF confirming that it detained 11 people and questioned 80 others. The IDF said it also searched 300 areas in Jenin, detaining several people, including Hamas affiliates and individuals preparing attacks against Israel. Fifteen people were detained in Ramallah, one person by the Duvdevan Unit in Tulkarm, and 16 in the southern West Bank.

Settlers also established four illegal outposts near the site of the initial clash: one near Tell, one near Awarta, one near Asira al-Qibliya and another near Mount Ebal. Additionally, settlers raided Abu Njeim, firing at vehicles and occupying one of its main roads. Later that day, a group of 20 settlers illegally enteted Tell for an unauthorized "hike". During an incident in the Israeli settlement of Susya, two Israelis were injured, including an active duty soldier, after a stone-throwing incident when a confrontation occurred with a Palestinian. The Palestinian then stole a gun from one of the Israelis, resulting in shots being fired into the air, before fleeing. The suspect was later arrested near Masafer Yatta.

=== 26 July ===
Settlers raided several villages overnight. In Qusra, the Rahma Mosque was set on fire and vandalized with phrases such as "Benayahu's Revenge" and Stars of David. The IDF said that it dispatched troops to the area, but the suspects fled before their arrival. Another mosque was set afire by settlers in Kur, where they spray-painted "Jewish blood is not free". Settlers set fire to a house Beit Furik, while several cars were burned near al-Mughayyir, Ramallah. Several Palestinians were injured in an attack on a factory in the Ein Samiya area.

The IDF meanwhile said that it had measured the homes of two Palestinians involved in the Tell shootout, and sealed one of them off, in preparation for their demolition.

On 26 July 2026, Israeli settlers set fire to the village's newly constructed al-Rahma mosque, causing damage to the building and spray-painting Hebrew graffiti including the slogan "Revenge Benayahu", referring to one of the Israeli soldiers killed during clashes near Tell two days earlier. The attack formed part of a series of settler attacks on Palestinian villages in the northern West Bank, during which another mosque in the nearby village of Kafr ad-Dik was also targeted. The Israeli military condemned the attacks on religious sites and said it was investigating the incidents.

=== 27 July ===
Some Palestinian medical organizations reported that the checkpoint lockdown on Nablus was preventing patients in the city from reaching hospitals. Physicians for Human Rights said that the ambulance network has been "nearly paralyzed". Agence France-Presse and Wafa reported that a pregnant woman lost her unborn child because her ambulance was stopped at the checkpoint and could not make it to the hospital in time.

=== August 2026 ===
In August, Jewish settlers laid siege to a house in Qusra and some of its inhabitants for several days. The U.S. ambassador to Israel, Mike Huckabee, called the siege a “horrific act of terror.”

== Reactions ==
Netanyahu vowed to respond with full force against "the terrorists" and their sponsors. He also said that the Israeli government would establish new settler outposts in the West Bank. Shin Bet chief David Zini described the attack in Tell as "grave and painful", while urging Israeli citizens not to "take the law into their own hands". Eyal Zamir vowed to track down all of the participants in the attack and hold them accountable. Far-right finance minister Bezalel Smotrich said that "Tell, Iraq Burin and Beit Furik need to look exactly like the refugee camps in Nablus and Tulkarm", referring to the Iron Wall operation that displaced thousands of Palestinians in 2025. Benayahu Mellet was eulogized by president Isaac Herzog, who described his killing as heartbreaking and sent condolences to his family. Hundreds of people attended Mellet's funeral, which was held in Havat Gilad, including lawmakers Yitzhak Wasserlauf, Orit Strook, Ze'ev Elkin, Limor Son Har-Melech, and Amit Halevi.

On 30 September 2026, President Isaac Herzog described the rising violence as "nationalist crime" and “phenomena that go to the root of our ability to function as a state, undermine our ability to exercise sovereignty and Israel’s rule of law.”

The Palestinian foreign ministry condemned the killing of Palestinians in the shootout as a massacre and described it as a representation of the "ongoing Nakba". The office of Palestinian president Mahmoud Abbas condemned what it described as terrorism committed by "Israeli colonists" in the subsequent settler riots. A funeral for the four Palestinians killed in Tell was held on 25 July, with only 30 people in attendance due to heavy restrictions by the IDF. On 11 August, the home of Farouq Ramadan was later demolished by the Israeli army.

== See also ==
- Israeli settler violence
- Timeline of the Israeli–Palestinian conflict in 2026
