= Tuvia Katz =

Polish-born Israeli artist

Tuvia Katz (Hebrew: טוביה קץ; born 1936) was an Israeli artist.

Katz was born in Poland to a traditional family. To escape the Nazis, his family fled Europe and settled in Argentina. In 1960, Katz immigrated to Israel and settled on Kibbutz Hokuk. At the age of forty, he became religious and studied for the rabbinate.

Katz is an abstract painter who creates faith-inspired art. He has won various prizes over the years. In 1979, he held a solo exhibition at the Israel Museum.

Katz is the founder and head of the "Art and Faith" program at Mikhlelet Yerushalayim in Bayit Vegan, Jerusalem.

He had three children and lived in Jerusalem. His daughter, Inbal, is married to Rabbi Eliezer Melamed, head of the Har Bracha yeshiva.

== Awards ==
- 1969 - America-Israel Cultural Foundation
- 1992 - Jerusalem Prize for painting
