= Madama, Nablus =

Palestinian village in the West Bank

- Municipality type C

Arabic transcription(s)
  - Arabic: مادما
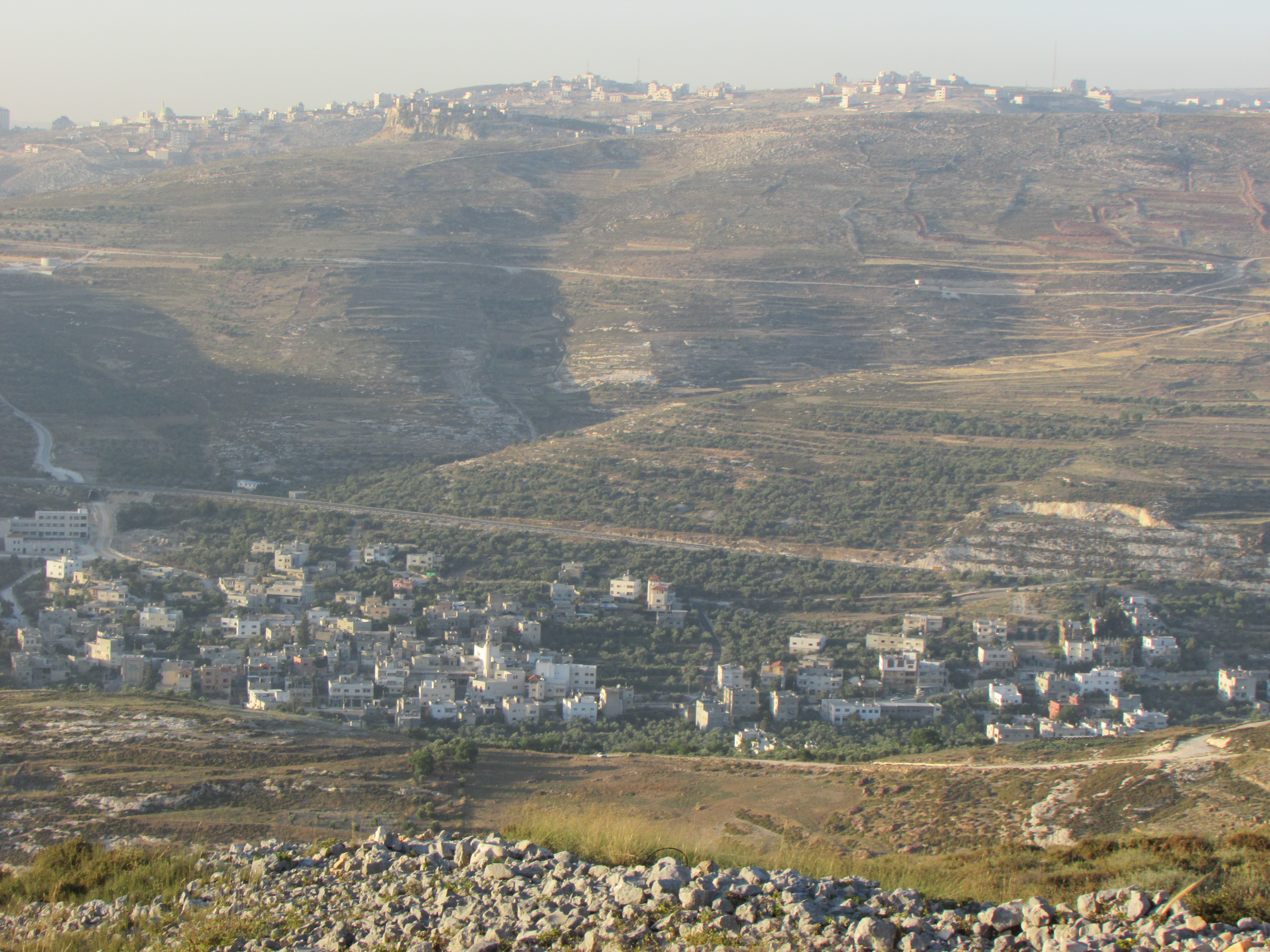
- Madama

- Location of Madama, Nablus within Palestine
- Coordinates: 32°11′00″N 35°14′10″E
- Palestine grid: 171/176
- State: State of Palestine
- Governorate: Nablus

Government
  - Type: Municipality

Population (2017)
  - Total: 2,092
- Name meaning: from personal name

Madama is a Palestinian village in the Nablus Governorate.

== Location ==
Madama is located 4.78 kilometres (3 mi) south of Nablus. It is bordered by Burin to the east, Asira al-Qibliya to the west and south, and Tell and Iraq Burin to the north.

== History ==
=== Ottoman era ===
In 1517, the village was included in the Ottoman Empire with the rest of Palestine, and in the 1596 tax-records it was noted as Madama, located in the Nahiya of Jabal Qubal, part of Nablus Sanjak. The population was 36 households, all Muslim. They paid a fixed tax rate of 33,3% on agricultural products, including wheat, barley, summer crops, olive trees, goats and beehives, in addition to occasional revenues and a fixed tax for people of Nablus area; a total of 6,250 akçe.

In 1870/1871 (1288 AH), an Ottoman census listed the village in the nahiya (sub-district) of Jamma'in al-Thani, subordinate to Nablus.

In 1882, the PEF's Survey of Western Palestine (SWP) described Madama as: "a small hamlet in a valley."

=== British Mandate era ===
In the 1922 census of Palestine conducted by the British Mandate authorities, Madama had a population of 170, all Muslims, increasing in the 1931 census to 211, still all Muslims, in a total of 67 houses.

In the 1945 statistics Madama had a population of 290 Muslims and a total of 3,361 dunams of land, according to an official land and population survey. Of this, 162 dunams were plantations and irrigable land, 1,943 used for cereals, while 30 dunams were built-up land.

=== Jordanian era ===
In the wake of the 1948 Arab–Israeli War, and after the 1949 Armistice Agreements, Madama came under Jordanian rule.

The Jordanian census of 1961 found 456 inhabitants in Madama.

=== Post-1967 ===
Since the Six-Day War in 1967, Madama has been under Israeli occupation.

After the 1995 accords, 62% of Madama land was defined as Area B, while the remaining 32% was defined as Area C. Israel has confiscated 139 dunams of land from Madama in order to construct the Israeli settlement of Yitzhar.

==== Settler violence ====
In 2006, an incident occurred in Madama in which neighbouring Israeli settlers both "poisoned the village's only well and shot at aid workers who came to clean it."

In May 2017, Israeli settlers, apparently from Yitzhar, attacked a Palestinian shepherd from Madama. The Palestinian was "bleeding profusely", and was sent to a hospital in Nablus. The Israeli soldiers "fired in the air, dispersing the assailants", but none of the attackers were arrested.

In April 2018, Israeli soldiers were filmed "cheering after shooting unarmed Palestinian with rubber bullets" by a roadblock by Madama.

In May 2019, it was reported that Israeli settlers from Yitzhar had started razing and levelling Palestinian-owned agricultural lands in Madama, in order to make a settler-only road.

In September 2019, settlers from Yitzhar stormed the southern part of Madama and set fire to olive trees.

On 20 January 2023, about 30 settlers escorted by 7 soldiers came to the village of Madama and began stoning residents homes. Residents attempting to defend their homes were fired upon by the soldiers, who used tear gas and several live rounds. The settlers then left the area through village olive groves, breaking three roughly five-year-old olive trees on their way out.

=== Destruction of monument in Madama ===
On 25 August 2026, during a tour escorted by the Israeli military, Zvi Sukkot and his aides destroyed a monument commemorating "martyrs" who were killed in the First and Second Intifadas in Madama. Sukkot stated the monument was "commemorating terrorists in the murderers' villages" of Madama and Burin and called for the Israeli army to remove the monument a few days prior, though to no avail. He also stated on social media: "Every child who sees a huge monument that glorifies the murderers of Jews every day will dream of becoming a terrorist." The IDF accused Sukkot of having "acted deceptively and manipulatively", in asking for its protection at the location, verifying that resources were diverted to accompany Sukkot only for him to commit the vandalism.

His actions were condemned by Israeli Prime Minister Benjamin Netanyahu, calling it as "unacceptable" and "interferes with the IDF’s ability to focus on its missions against terrorism and incitement." Finance Minister and leader of the Religious Zionist Party, Bezalel Smotrich condemned Sukkot's actions, reportedly telling him that "he should not have acted without proper authorization and authority" and RZP member of Knesset, Ohad Tal, denounced the incident in the party's group on WhatsApp.

=== Prison under the open sky ===
In October 2026, Israeli forces have sealed off the sole entrance to Madama village, located south of Nablus, effectively isolating about 2,500 inhabitants and limiting their movement. According to Rami Nassar, the head of the village council, earth barriers were used to block the entrances, affecting access to healthcare, education, employment, and farmland. Although a route for humanitarian aid was briefly opened, it was soon closed again. Since the blockade began on October 11, residents have struggled to reach Nablus, often having to travel on foot over long distances. This situation has disrupted the supply of essential goods and placed patients requiring regular medical care in serious danger.

== Bibliography ==
- Barron, J.B., ed. (1923). Palestine: Report and General Abstracts of the Census of 1922. Government of Palestine.
- Conder, C.R.; Kitchener, H.H. (1882). The Survey of Western Palestine: Memoirs of the Topography, Orography, Hydrography, and Archaeology. Vol. 2. London: Committee of the Palestine Exploration Fund.
- Government of Jordan, Department of Statistics (1964). First Census of Population and Housing. Volume I: Final Tables; General Characteristics of the Population (PDF).
- Government of Palestine, Department of Statistics (1945). Village Statistics, April, 1945.
- Hadawi, S. (1970). Village Statistics of 1945: A Classification of Land and Area ownership in Palestine. Palestine Liberation Organization Research Center.
- Hütteroth, W.-D.; Abdulfattah, K. (1977). Historical Geography of Palestine, Transjordan and Southern Syria in the Late 16th Century. Erlanger Geographische Arbeiten, Sonderband 5. Erlangen, Germany: Vorstand der Fränkischen Geographischen Gesellschaft. ISBN 3-920405-41-2.
- Mills, E., ed. (1932). Census of Palestine 1931. Population of Villages, Towns and Administrative Areas. Jerusalem: Government of Palestine.
- Palmer, E.H. (1881). The Survey of Western Palestine: Arabic and English Name Lists Collected During the Survey by Lieutenants Conder and Kitchener, R. E. Transliterated and Explained by E.H. Palmer. Committee of the Palestine Exploration Fund.
