= Yeshivat Har Bracha =

Coordinates: 32.19442°N 35.26494°E

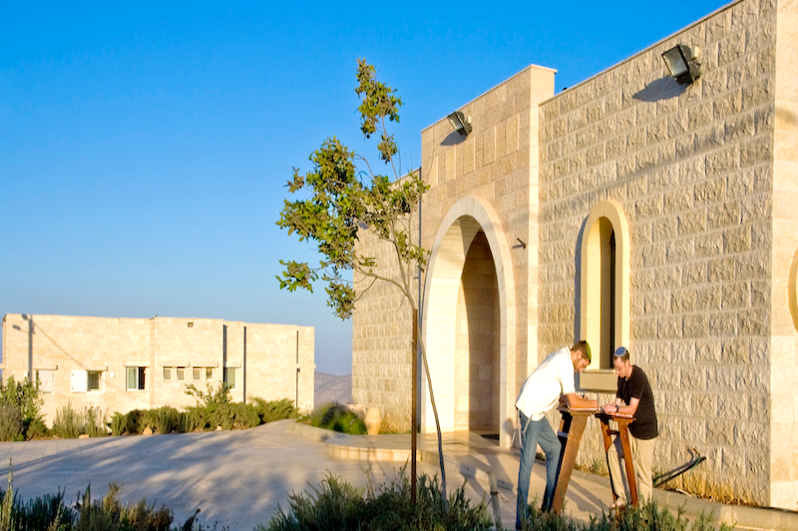
Yeshivat Har Bracha

Yeshivat Har Bracha (Hebrew: ישיבת הר-ברכה), is a national-religious yeshiva in Har Brakha, an Israeli settlement in the West Bank near Nablus. The yeshiva was founded in 1991 by Rabbi Eliezer Melamed.

== Scholarship Programs ==
In addition to the standard Hesder program, the yeshiva offers several programs:

Shiluvim Program – a scholarship program that allows single and married students who have graduated the Hesder program the opportunity to obtain an academic degree at Ariel University, while continuing their Torah studies in the yeshiva.

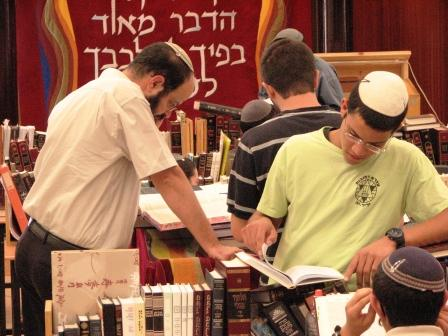
The "Beit Midrash"

Advanced Degree Program – for graduates of the Shiluvim program who continue for Masters and Doctorate degrees. The program advances students who excel in investigative research, with the understanding that delving into the natural sciences is not only a way to make a living, but also a tool for the deepening of the Torah, and the implementation of the Heavenly ideals in everyday life.

== Publications ==
Har Bracha Institute of Publications has published the series "Peninei Halakha" written by the Rosh Yeshiva, Rabbi Eliezer Melamed. In addition, three volumes of the book "Revivim", a compilation of articles written by Rabbi Melamed from the newspaper Basheva, has been published. The institute has published the series of books by Rabbi Zadok HaKohen, meriting the Jewish nation and the many students of his teachings with a new and handsome edition, complete with source indications and a detailed subject glossary. The institute has also published the books of Rabbi Ze'ev Sultanovich. So far, in the series "Bina L'Itim", an in-depth look at Jewish identity, history, and philosophy, two volumes covering the period from Creation till the Expulsion from Spain have been published. In the series of books elucidating the writings of Rabbi Abraham Isaac Kook, explanations to the books "Orot Yisrael" and "L'mahalach Ha'Idiyot B'Yisrael" have been published, and "Mizmor 19 of State of Israel" of Rabbi Zvi Yehuda Kook. The institute has also published books by Professor Zohar Amar: "Five Types of Grain: Historical and Conceptual Aspects", and books by Professor Benjamin Fain: "Creation Ex Nihilo" and "Law and Providence"; and book by Avraham Jacob Sluzky "Return To Zion".

=== Haredi Ban on Some Publications ===
On May 2, 2022, six prominent hareidi rabbis issued a letter banning Melamed's Peninei Halacha Books which they claim ‘uproot halachic traditions’. The Har Bracha yeshiva headed by Melamed chose not to respond to the letter of those hareidi rabbis.

== See also ==
- Peninei Halakha
