= Ghassan Najjar =

Palestinian farmer and activist (born 1990)

- غسان نجّار
- Born: 1990 (age 35–36); Burin, Nablus Governorate, Palestine
- Occupations: Farmer; Human rights activist
- Years active: 2005–present
- Organization(s): Land and Farming Agricultural Collective
- Known for: Campaigning against settler violence in Burin

Ghassan Najjar (Arabic: غسان نجّار; born c. 1990) is a Palestinian farmer and human rights activist. An olive farmer in the village of Burin in the West Bank, Najjar is a community leader who founded the Land and Farming Agricultural Collective and the Sumoud network, which aim to provide support and empowerment to farmers and shepherds experiencing discrimination from Israeli settlers. As a result of his activism in defence of land rights for Palestinians, Najjar has been frequently held in administrative detention by Israeli authorities, most recently since October 2026.

== Activism ==
Najjar is from Burin, a village south of Nablus in the northern West Bank, Palestine. He works as an olive farmer.

Najjar is the founder of the Land and Farming Agricultural Collective, which promotes the concepts of agroecology, food sovereignty and environmental issues among farmers and shepherds. The organisation also promotes the preservation of local Palestinian culture in response to Israeli oppression, including through the organisation of an annual kite festival.

Najjar is also the creator and coordinator of Sumoud, a network supporting farmers and shepherds. This includes defending their rights to access their lands, and building community resilience in response to the Israeli occupation of the West Bank, settler violence and displacement.

Najjar is supportive of Palestinian statehood.

=== Settler violence in Burin ===
Burin is surrounded by the Israeli settlements of Yitzhar and Har Brakha. Since the construction of the settlements, farmers and shepherds in Burin have experienced settler violence and military raids that have resulted in them being restricted from entering their land, particularly during the olive harvest season. In October 2009, the Michigan Peace Team documented that settlers had cut down 250 olive trees in Burin with chainsaws; in October 2010, the Israeli human rights group B'Tselem reported four separate attacks by settlers against Palestinian farmers during that year's olive harvest. The frequency of attacks increased in 2011; in June, fires lit by settlers destroyed 2500 olive trees and 900 dunams of land, while in September settlers from Yitzhar burned 200 trees while villagers were celebrating a wedding. In 2013, the human rights group Yesh Din reported that Burin had lost more olive trees to settler vandalism than any other village in the West Bank.

Najjar has stated that violence and displacement in Burin was a direct result of the establishment of Israeli settlements nearby during the 1980s, stating there had been no prior incidents of Israeli-Palestinian violence prior to the construction of Yitzhar and Har Brakha. He has also been critical of the increased presence of the Israeli military in Burin from 2008 due to the rise in settler violence, alleging that many soldiers came from settler backgrounds and so supported the settlers during skirmishes. Najjar also documented soldiers preventing farmers from accessing their land during the harvest season without giving a rationale.

== Arrests and imprisonment ==
As a result of his activism, as of 2026 Najjar had spent a total of almost ten years in administrative detention in Israeli prisons. He was first arrested at the age of 15. Since 2011, he has been subject to a travel ban from Shin Bet, Israel's internal security service.

On 27 August 2014, Najjar was arrested during a pre-dawn raid and detained at an interrogation centre in Petah Tikva. The arrest occurred shortly after Najjar attempted to prevent Israeli soldiers from entering the girls' classroom of a local school. During the arrest, Israeli soldiers caused extensive damage to Najjar's home. It was subsequently announced that Najjar had been accused of throwing stones and hitting an Israeli soldiers, though video footage of his interactions with soldiers during the raid of the school appeared to dispute that. A military court extended Najjar's detention on 31 August and 7 September after the soldier alleged to have been struck by Najjar failed to attend a hearing.

At around 03:00 on 27 October 2026, Najjar was arrested during a pre-dawn raid by the Israeli military during the beginning of the olive harvest. It was reported that in the week leading up to his arrest that Najjar had been threatened by agents from Shin Bet with arrest if he did not stop his activism. His whereabouts were unknown for 36 hours before his lawyer was informed that Najjar was being questioned at an Israel interrogation centre.

Najjar's lawyer announced that he had been informed Najjar would likely be placed under administrative detention, meaning he could be held indefinitely and without charge. As of November 2026, Najjar is detained at a military detention centre in Huwara. On 9 November an administrative detention order was granted. On 17 November, the Ofer Military Court upheld his four-month administrative detention, following a judicial review held the previous day.

== Response ==
Amnesty International called for Najjar to be released, stating he had been arrested as a result of his peaceful activism to protect the olive harvest in Burin in an attempt to intimidate Palestinian farmers and land defenders. Front Line Defenders called on Israeli officials to immediately and unconditionally release Najjar and other imprisoned activists in the West Bank.

Najjar was featured in the short film Burin Under Fire in 2025, documenting the experiences of farmers and shepherds in Burin.
