= Eliezer Melamed =

Israeli religious-Zionist rabbi

Rabbi Eliezer Melamed
- אליעזר מלמד
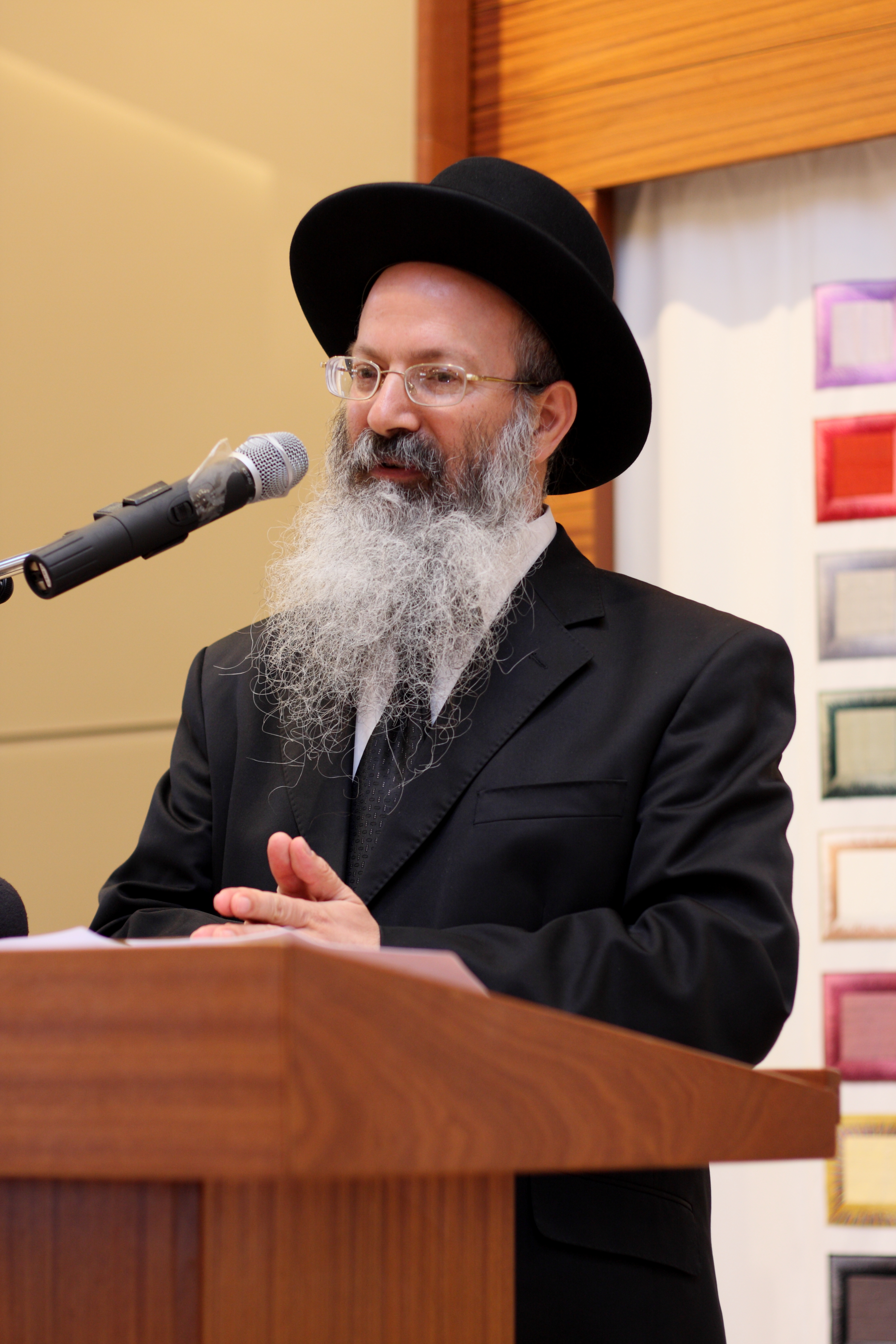

Rosh Yeshiva of Yeshivat Har Bracha

Rabbi of Har Bracha
- Incumbent
- Assumed office August 1988

Personal life
- Born: June 28, 1961 (age 64)
- Spouse: Inbal Melamed
- Children: 13
- Education: Mercaz HaRav
- Occupation: Rabbi, Rosh Yeshiva

Religious life
- Religion: Judaism
- Denomination: Orthodox
- Yeshiva: Yeshivat Har Bracha

Eliezer Melamed (Hebrew: אליעזר מלמד; born 28 June 1961) is an Israeli Religious-Zionist rabbi, the rosh yeshiva of Yeshivat Har Bracha, the rabbi of the settlement Har Brakha, and the author of Peninei Halakha, a series of Halakhic works.

== Biography ==
Eliezer Melamed is the son of Zalman Baruch Melamed, Israeli Orthodox rabbi, and the rosh yeshiva of the Beit El yeshiva. Melamed is married to Inbal, daughter of the artist Tuvia Katz, and has thirteen children. Most of them are married and live in Har Bracha.

In his youth, he studied with Zvi Yehuda Kook, and later studied at the Horev Yeshiva and the "Yeshiva L'zeirim". After that, he studied at the Merkaz HaRav for about six years. He did his military service in the Military Rabbinate and served as military rabbi of the Shomron Military Rabbinate.

== Rabbinic and teaching career ==
Melamed was ordained to the rabbinate by Avraham Shapira, and Chaim Katz. He taught for one year at the Kollel for Ba'alei Teshuvah in the Mea Shearim neighborhood of Yitzhak Ginsburg.

Later on, he taught Talmud, and Emuna (Jewish philosophy) in particular, in the Yeshiva of Bet El for approximately twenty years, and four years in the Yeshiva of Kedumim. Melamed edited a new edition of the book Shnei Luchot HaBrit (the Shelah), and the first two volumes of the new edition of Zadok HaKohen from Lublin's books. In addition, he took part in the completion of the entire series.

In August 1988, Melamed was appointed to serve as the rabbi of the community of the small settlement Har Bracha.

In September 1992, Melamed established Yeshivat Har Bracha, which he leads. In the Yeshiva, Melamed teaches a daily class in Halakhah, gives classes in Emuna, and guidance in public and private matters.

In July 2013, he received "The Jewish Creation Award" for his series of books Peninei Halakha.

In November 2020, he received "Rabbi Kook Award" for his series.

== Published works ==
Peninei Halachah is a series of books on halakhic subjects, authored by Melamed, that cover such subjects as the laws of Shabbat and the Jewish perspective on organ donations. In addition to posing the practical law on the matter, these books discuss the spiritual foundations of the Halakhot, and also reflect the various customs of different communities. Written in Hebrew, the book series has sold over 1 milion copies. Twenty two books have been published in Hebrew, of which ten have been translated into English, ten into French, twelve into Spanish, and thirteen into Russian. The books are rapidly gaining widespread popularity among the Religious Zionist community in Israel.

== Views ==
=== Torah and Science ===
Rabbi Melamed's approach is that combining Torah with science is an important value. He justifies his approach by stating that the purpose of the Torah is to influence every area of reality, and to become a "Torah of Life" that is not limited to the walls of the Beit Midrash alone.

=== Various Jewish movements ===
In 2022, he participated in a Zoom meeting in which Rabbi Delphine Horvilleur also participated, and as a result he was criticized by Israeli rabbis. In response to the criticism, Rabbi Melamed published his opinion in the newspaper Besheva and explained his position. In this context, he brought the opinion of the former Chief Rabbi and Rosh Yeshiva of the Mercaz HaRav, Rabbi Avraham Elkana Shapira.

After the confrontations on Tisha B'Av 2021 in the "Ezrat Yisrael" plaza near the Western Wall, Rabbi Melamed published his position in the "Revivim" column, according to which members of the various streams who are not interested in praying in the Western Wall plaza should be allowed to pray in "Ezrat Yisrael". He also called on the Rabbi of the Western Wall to make Torah scrolls available to these streams for reading. A few days later, the CEO of the Masorti Movement in Israel, Rakefet Ginsberg, came to visit Rabbi Melamed at his home in order to strengthen the unity of the Jewish people.

== Public activities ==
- The establishment of the youth organization Ariel and its first branch in Kiryat Moshe, Jerusalem.
- The establishment of the "Rabbinical Council of Judea, Samaria, and Gaza". Melamed was the first secretary of the Council. He published 35 editions of the Council's newsletters, which dealt with the clarification of crucial and relevant issues, and the clarification of fundamental public and national issues.
- Together with his parents, Melamed took part in the establishment of the radio station Arutz Sheva. His daily halakha broadcast gained high ratings, and taught Jewish law to thousands of households throughout Israel. These broadcasts served as the cornerstone for the first books in the series Peninei Halachah. Melamed also took part in the establishment of the newspaper Besheva. Since the beginning, Melamed has served as the newspaper's spiritual authority, and he writes a weekly column, Revivim, which obtained wide exposure and impact. Currently, the articles have been compiled into three books.

== Views and opinions ==
In 2005, Melamed told his followers to deduct the days they spent in prison protesting the disengagement from the days they serve on Israeli Defense Force (IDF) reserve duty, suggesting even that they might multiply the days in prison two- or three-fold. In 2009, he expressed support for soldiers disobeying IDF orders if they came in conflict with the soldier's political or religious beliefs. This position gained some support from fellow rabbis. Melamed was threatened with consequences for his stance, and eventually, then-Defense Minister, Ehud Barak, cancelled the Hesder program at Melamed's Yeshiva. In July 2013, Barak's successor, Moshe Ya'alon, resumed the program. In 2012, concerned that IDF members were being forced to listen to women singing (in conflict with a religious prohibition on doing so), he called for followers to delay enlisting until that policy was changed.
