= Iraq Burin =

- Municipality type D (village council)

Arabic transcription(s)
  - Arabic: عراق بورن
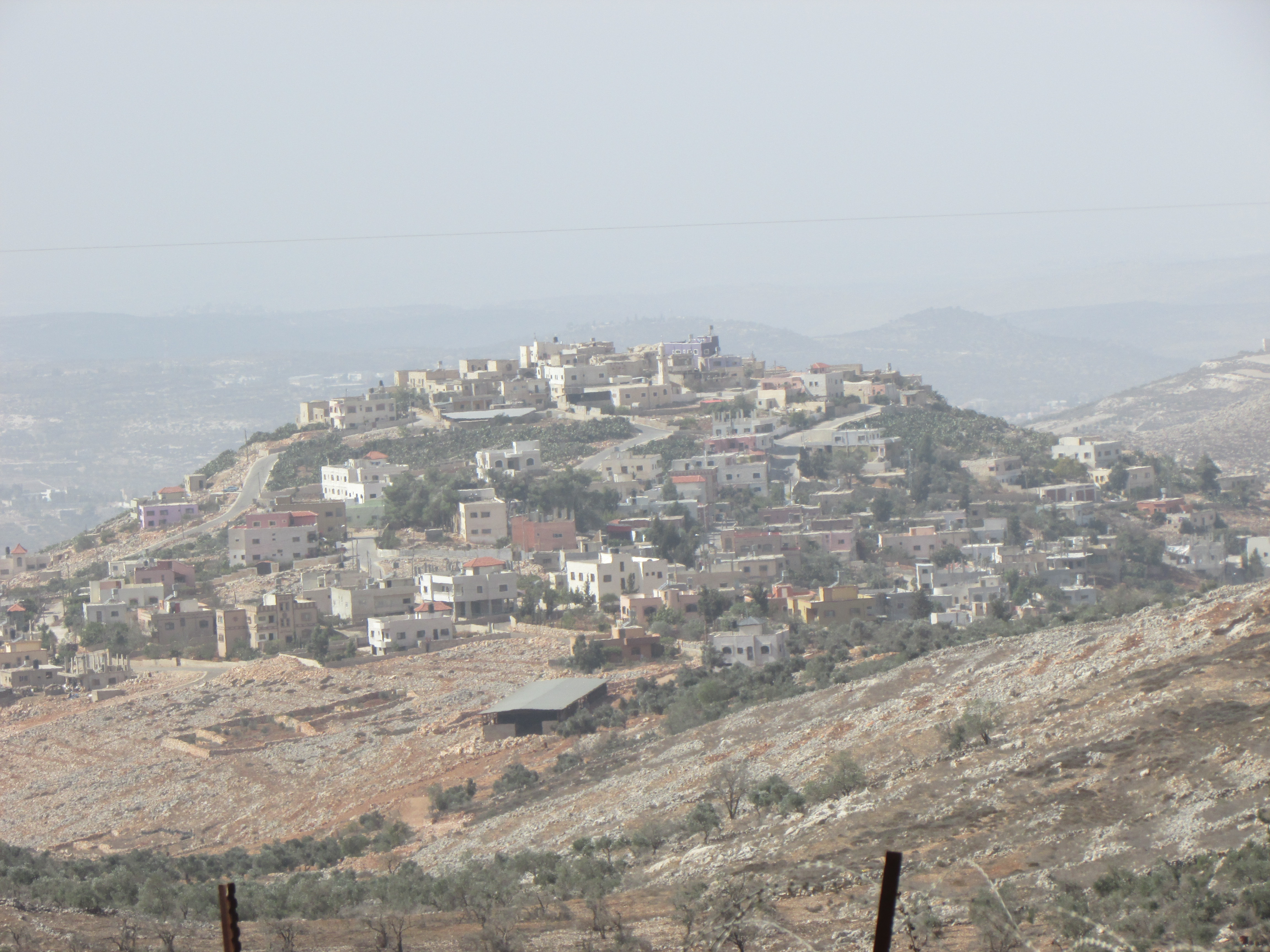
- Iraq Burin

- Location of Iraq Burin within Palestine
- Coordinates: 32°12′05″N 35°14′20″E
- Palestine grid: 172/178
- State: State of Palestine
- Governorate: Nablus

Government
  - Type: Village council

Population (2017)
  - Total: 1,008
- Name meaning: El ’Arâk, the cliff, bank, or shore

Iraq Burin is a Palestinian village in the Nablus Governorate of the State of Palestine.

== History ==
A tomb on the flanks of the village, to the north side, contained Late Bronze II and IA I pieces.

Remains from the Iron Age I (1200-1100 BCE) have been found here.

The road leading to the village have revealed parts of a mosaic floor, which might have belonged to a shrine from the Byzantine era.

=== Ottoman era ===
In 1838, in the Ottoman era, the village, called el Arak, was noted located in the Jurat Amra district, south of Nablus, and was inhabited by Muslims.

In 1870 Victor Guérin noted it located north-east of Tell, "perched like an eagle's nest on the summit of a very steep rocky hill."

In 1882 the PEF's Survey of Western Palestine (SWP) noted that Arak "is named from the cliff on which it stands, on a spur of Gerizim; it is of moderate size and built of stone, with two springs beneath in the valley, one north, one south; olives are grown on the hill facing the village towards the north."

=== British Mandate era ===
In the 1922 census of Palestine, conducted by the British Mandate authorities, Iraq Burin had 81 Muslim inhabitants, decreasing in the 1931 census to 62, still all Muslim, in a total of 16 houses.

In the 1945 statistics, Iraq Burin was counted with Burin, and together they had a population of 1,200, all Muslims, with 19,096 dunams of land, according to an official land and population survey. Of this, 1,797 dunams were plantations and irrigable land, 8,741 used for cereals, while 106 dunams were built-up (urban) land.

=== Jordanian era ===
In the wake of the 1948 Arab–Israeli War, and after the 1949 Armistice Agreements, Iraq Burin came under Jordanian rule.

=== Post-1967 ===
Since the Six-Day War in 1967, Iraq Burin has been under Israeli occupation.

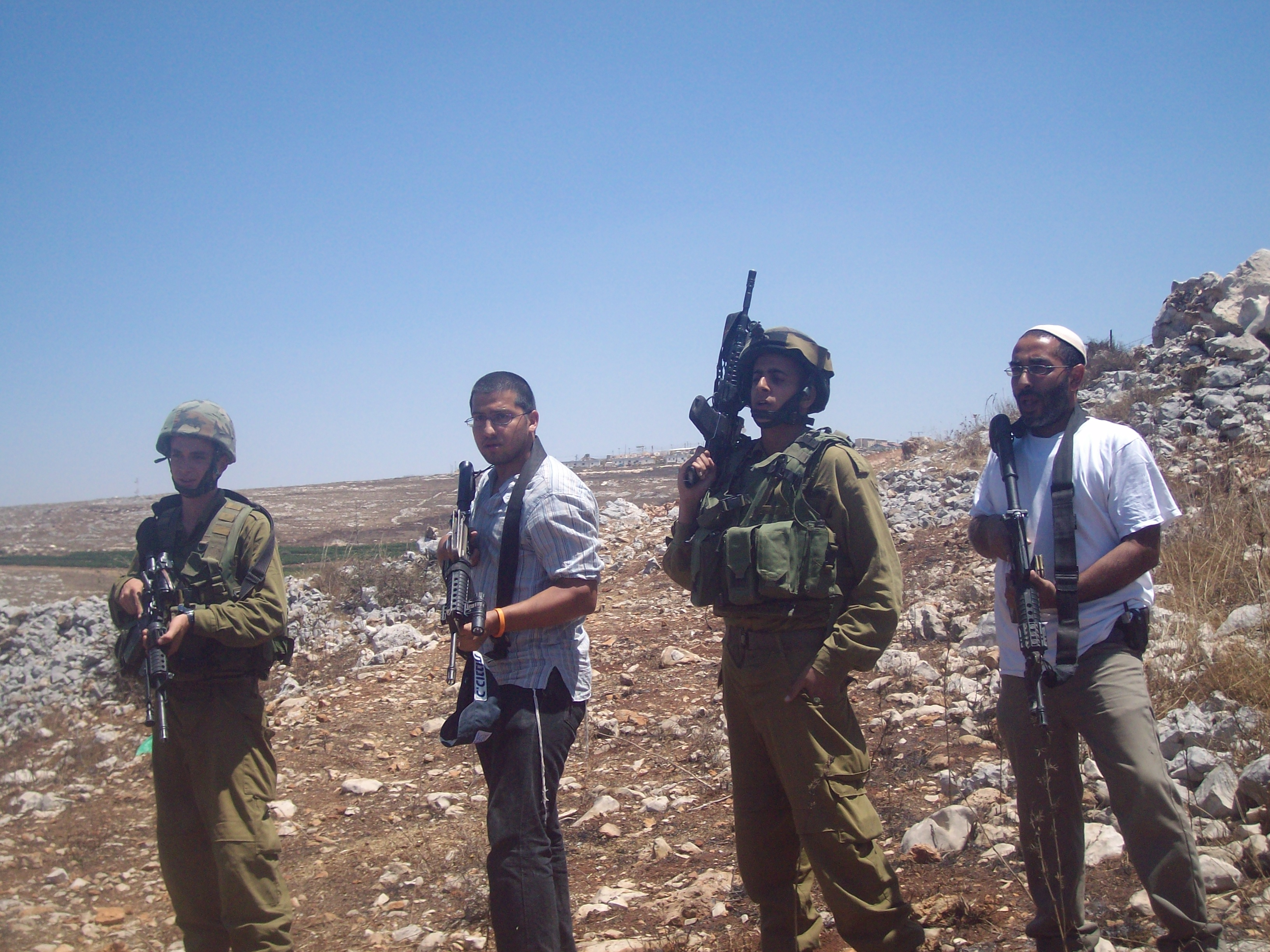
Israeli military personnel and armed settlers in Iraq Burin, August 2009

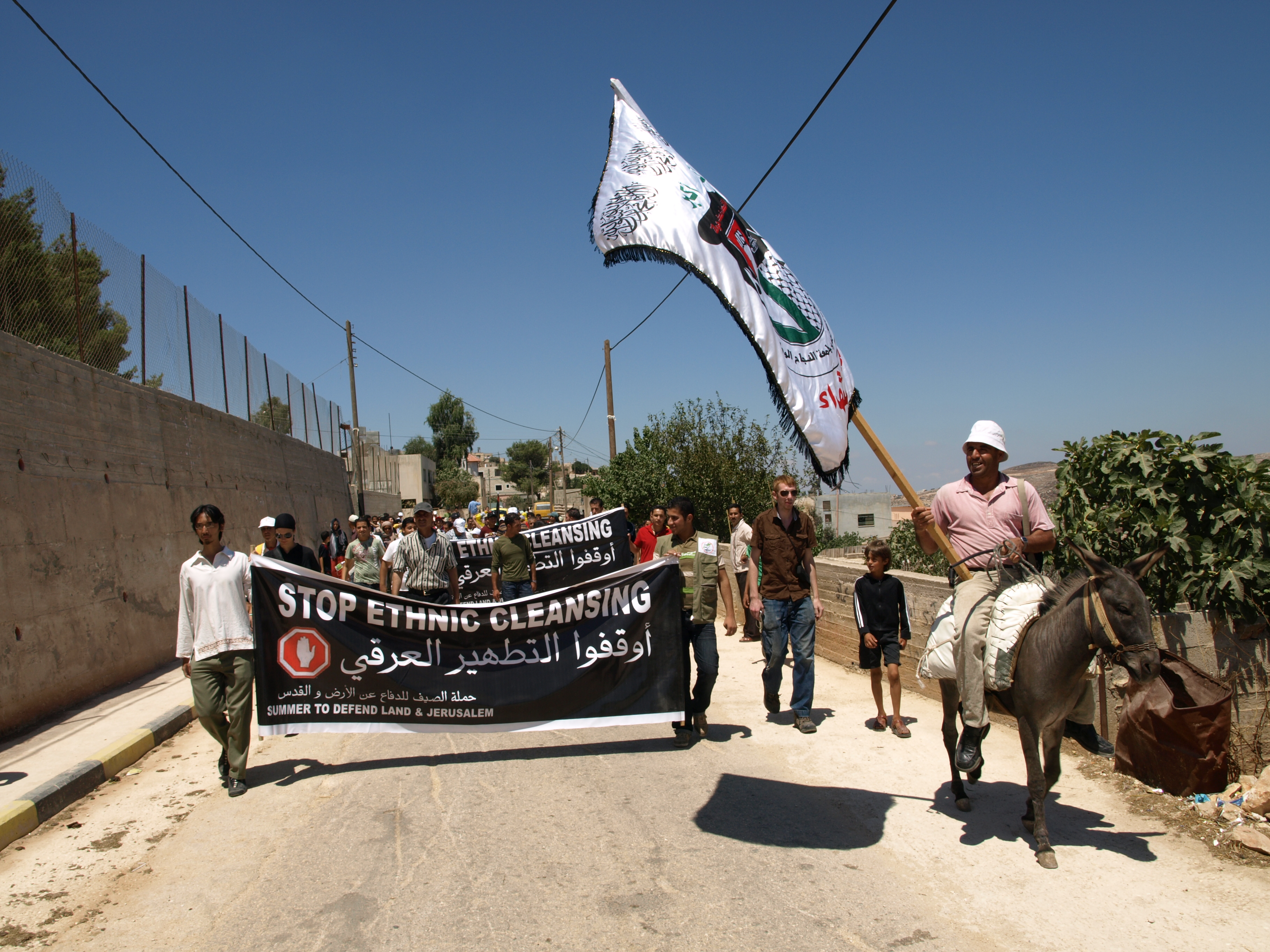
Demonstration in Iraq Burin

In 2009, the Israeli settlement of Har Brakha took control of 30 dunams of village land, west of the village, which formerly were used for grapes and almonds. In total, Israel has confiscated 291 dunams of land from Iraq Burin in order to construct Har Brakha, in addition to land taken from Burin and Kafr Qallil.

In March, 2010, two brothers of the village, Mohammed and Osaid Qadus, 16 and 18 years old, were shot dead by Israeli soldiers, in an incident which the IDF said happened because the Israeli troops were "ill-prepared for missions."

In January, 2011, 19 year old Oday Maher Hamza Qadous was shot dead by an Israeli settler from Har Brakha. The villagers said Qadous was farming in the village fields when he was shot, while the settlers said he was throwing stones.

== Bibliography ==
- Barron, J.B., ed. (1923). Palestine: Report and General Abstracts of the Census of 1922. Government of Palestine.
- Bull, Robert J.; Edward F. Campbell (1968). "The Sixth Campaign at Balâṭah (Shechem)". Bulletin of the American Schools of Oriental Research. 190 (190): 2–41. doi:10.2307/1356191. JSTOR 1356191. S2CID 222441522.
- Conder, C.R.; Kitchener, H.H. (1882). The Survey of Western Palestine: Memoirs of the Topography, Orography, Hydrography, and Archaeology. Vol. 2. London: Committee of the Palestine Exploration Fund.
- Government of Palestine, Department of Statistics (1945). Village Statistics, April, 1945.
- Guérin, V. (1875). Description Géographique Historique et Archéologique de la Palestine (in French). Vol. 2: Samarie, pt. 2. Paris: L'Imprimerie Nationale.
- Hadawi, S. (1970). Village Statistics of 1945: A Classification of Land and Area ownership in Palestine. Palestine Liberation Organization Research Center.
- Jaroš, K.; Deckert B. (1977). Studien zur Sichem Ära (PDF). University of Zurich. pp. 1–83. ISBN 3-7278-0180-8.
- Miller II, Robert D. (2003). "A Gazetteer of Iron I Sites in the North-Central Highlands of Palestine". Annual of the American Schools of Oriental Research. 56: 143–218. ISBN 0-89757-026-X.
- Mills, E., ed. (1932). Census of Palestine 1931. Population of Villages, Towns and Administrative Areas. Jerusalem: Government of Palestine.
- Palmer, E.H. (1881). The Survey of Western Palestine: Arabic and English Name Lists Collected During the Survey by Lieutenants Conder and Kitchener, R. E. Transliterated and Explained by E.H. Palmer. Committee of the Palestine Exploration Fund.
- Robinson, E.; Smith, E. (1841). Biblical Researches in Palestine, Mount Sinai and Arabia Petraea: A Journal of Travels in the year 1838. Vol. 3. Boston: Crocker & Brewster.
