= Kafr Qallil =

- Municipality type D (Village council)

Arabic transcription(s)
  - Arabic: كفر قلّيل
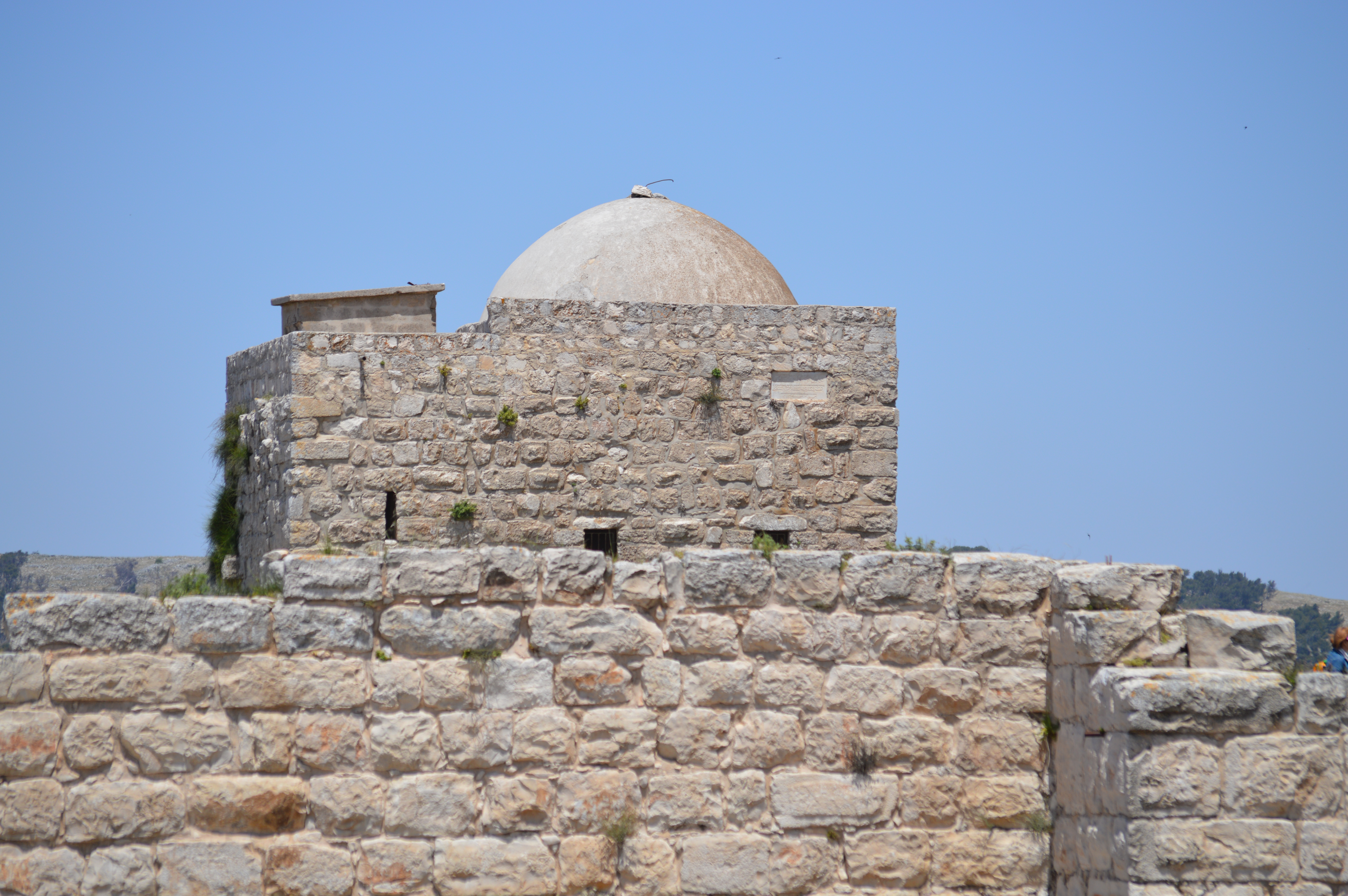
- Maqam of Sheikh Ghanem, on Mount Gerizim (Jabal at-Tur), which is currently under the control of the Israelis

- Location of Kafr Qallil within Palestine
- Coordinates: 32°11′28″N 35°16′34″E
- Palestine grid: 176/177
- State: State of Palestine
- Governorate: Nablus

Government
  - Type: Village council

Population (2017)
  - Total: 3,029
- Name meaning: Kefr Kullin, or Kullil, the village of Kullin, or Kullil

Kafr Qalil (Arabic: كفر قليل) is a Palestinian town in the Nablus Governorate of the State of Palestine, in the northern West Bank. According to the Palestinian Central Bureau of Statistics (PCBS), the town had a population of 3,029 inhabitants in 2017.

== Location ==
Kafr Qallil is located 4.30 km south of Nablus. It is bordered by Nablus to the north and east, and by Burin to the south and west.

== History ==
Pottery sherds from the early and late Roman and Byzantine eras have been found here. In addition to ceramics, inscriptions dating to the Byzantine era have been found here.

Pottery from the Umayyad era has also been found here.

Kafr Qalil was mentioned in the Samaritan Chronicle as inhabited by the Samaritans in the 7th century CE. Samaritan historian Benyamim Tsedaka references the Samaritan 'Aanaan family, cited in an 8th-century source, as former inhabitants of Kafr Qalil before their conversion. The Samaritan Tolidah, mentions Rabbi Ishaq son of Khalaf of the Bene Matar as a Torah teacher who lived in Kafr Qalil before moving to Beit Bizzin near Kafr Qaddum.

=== Ottoman era ===
Incorporated into the Ottoman Empire in 1517 with the rest of Palestine, in 1596 the village appeared in Ottoman tax registers as being in the nahiya of Jabal Qubal, part of Nablus Sanjak. It had a population of 50 households and 11 bachelors, all Muslim. They paid a fixed tax-rate of 33.3% on agricultural products, including wheat, barley, summer crops, olive trees, goats and beehives, in addition to occasional revenues and a press for olive oil or syrup; a total of 15,000 akçe.

In 1838, Kefr Kullin was noted as a village on the side of Mount Gerizim, located in the District of Jurat 'Amra, south of Nablus.

In 1870, Victor Guérin described it as being a village of two hundred inhabitants, separated by a valley in two districts, one northern and the other southern. A few gardens adjoined it.

In 1882, the PEF's Survey of Western Palestine described Kefr Kullin as "A small village at the foot of Gerizim, with a spring in it; it stands higher than the main road."

=== British Mandate era ===
In the 1922 census of Palestine conducted by the British Mandate authorities, Kufr Qallil had a population of 298 Muslims, increasing at the time of the 1931 census to 332, still all Muslim, in 79 houses.

In the 1945 statistics, Kafr Qallil (including Khirbat Sarin) had a population of 470, all Muslims, with 4,732 dunams of land, according to an official land and population survey. Of this, 83 dunams were plantations and irrigable land, 2,397 were used for cereals, while 39 dunams were built-up (urban) land.

=== Jordanian era ===
In the wake of the 1948 Arab–Israeli War, and after the 1949 Armistice Agreements, Kafr Qallil came under Jordanian rule.

The Jordanian census of 1961 found 749 inhabitants here.

=== 1967, aftermath ===
Since the Six-Day War in 1967, Kafr Qallil has been under Israeli occupation.

After the 1995 Accords, 27% of the village land was classified as Area A, the remaining 73% as Area C.

Israel has confiscated hundreds of dunams of land from the village. Some has been used for Israeli military checkpoints, and 15 dunams went to the Israeli settlement of Har Brakha.

== Demography ==
The inhabitants of Kafr Qallil belong to various families, such as the Amer, Mansour, and Theab families.

== Bibliography ==
- Barron, J.B., ed. (1923). Palestine: Report and General Abstracts of the Census of 1922. Government of Palestine.
- Bull, Robert J.; Edward F. Campbell (1968). "The Sixth Campaign at Balâṭah (Shechem)". Bulletin of the American Schools of Oriental Research. 190 (190): 2–41. doi:10.2307/1356191. JSTOR 1356191. S2CID 222441522.
- Conder, C.R. (1876). "Samarian Topography". Quarterly Statement - Palestine Exploration Fund. 8 (4): 182–197. doi:10.1179/peq.1876.8.4.182.
- Conder, C.R.; Kitchener, H.H. (1882). The Survey of Western Palestine: Memoirs of the Topography, Orography, Hydrography, and Archaeology. Vol. 2. London: Committee of the Palestine Exploration Fund.
- Dauphin, C. (1998). La Palestine byzantine, Peuplement et Populations. BAR International Series 726 (in French). Vol. III : Catalogue. Oxford: Archeopress. ISBN 0-860549-05-4.
- Government of Jordan, Department of Statistics (1964). First Census of Population and Housing. Volume I: Final Tables; General Characteristics of the Population (PDF).
- Government of Palestine, Department of Statistics (1945). Village Statistics, April, 1945.
- Guérin, V. (1874). Description Géographique Historique et Archéologique de la Palestine (in French). Vol. 2: Samarie, pt. 1. Paris: L'Imprimerie Nationale.
- Hadawi, S. (1970). Village Statistics of 1945: A Classification of Land and Area ownership in Palestine. Palestine Liberation Organization Research Center.
- Hütteroth, W.-D.; Abdulfattah, K. (1977). Historical Geography of Palestine, Transjordan and Southern Syria in the Late 16th Century. Erlanger Geographische Arbeiten, Sonderband 5. Erlangen, Germany: Vorstand der Fränkischen Geographischen Gesellschaft. ISBN 3-920405-41-2.
- Mills, E., ed. (1932). Census of Palestine 1931. Population of Villages, Towns and Administrative Areas. Jerusalem: Government of Palestine.
- Palmer, E.H. (1881). The Survey of Western Palestine: Arabic and English Name Lists Collected During the Survey by Lieutenants Conder and Kitchener, R. E. Transliterated and Explained by E.H. Palmer. Committee of the Palestine Exploration Fund.
- Robinson, E.; Smith, E. (1841). Biblical Researches in Palestine, Mount Sinai and Arabia Petraea: A Journal of Travels in the year 1838. Vol. 3. Boston: Crocker & Brewster.
- Saulcy, L.F. de (1854). Narrative of a journey round the Dead Sea, and in the Bible lands, in 1850 and 1851. Vol. 2, new edition. London: R. Bentley.
