= Area A =

Area A منطقة أ שטח א
- West Bank area under the Oslo II Accord
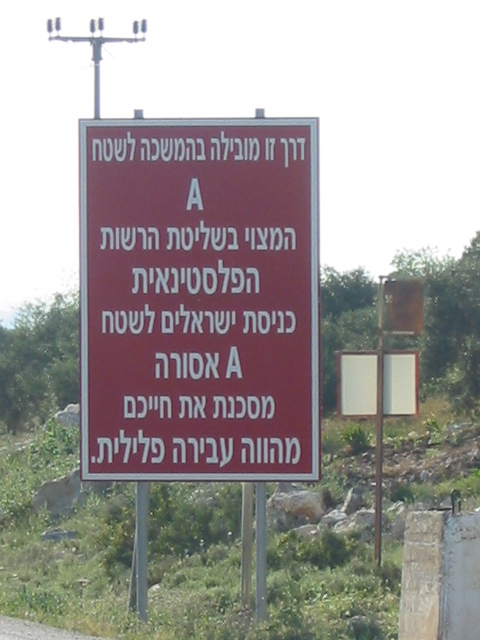
- Israeli signpost warning Israeli citizens that entry into Area 'A' is forbidden, life-endangering, and constitutes a criminal offense
- Interactive map of Area A
- Established: 1995
- Largest city: Nablus (156,906)
- Currency: Israeli new shekel Jordanian dinar

Area A (Arabic: منطقة أ, romanized: minṭaqa alif; Hebrew: שטח א, romanized: Shetakh A) is an area under the civil and security control of the Palestinian National Authority. It represents about 18% of the area and 55% of the population of the West Bank.

The largest cities in Area A include the following cities and their surroundings: Nablus, Jenin, Tulkarm, Qalqilya, Ramallah, Bethlehem, Jericho, and 80% of Hebron. There are no Israeli settlements in Area A.

== History ==
During the first phase of the implementation of the Oslo Accords in 1995, Area A comprised 3% of the West Bank excluding East Jerusalem.

In 1997, the Hebron Protocol divided the city of Hebron was divided into two areas: Area H1, representing approximately 80% of the city, was placed under Palestinian civil and security control (equivalent to Area A), while Area H2, representing the remaining 20%, was placed under Palestinian civil and Israeli security control (equivalent to Area B). H2, which is located in the central part of the city and includes the historic center, is home to approximately 40,000 Palestinians (19% of Hebron's population) and 850 Jewish settlers. Another 8,000 Jews live in Kiryat Arba on the outskirts of Hebron.

Since the start of the Second Intifada in October 2000, Israeli citizens have been completely banned from entering Area A, by order of the IDF's general command. However, the IDF has admitted that in practice, it only ensured that Jewish Israelis complied with the ban, and that Arab Israelis may enter Area A.

During the Operation Defensive Shield in 2002, the Israeli military lifted the ban on military entry and temporarily reoccupied the area in order to suppress the Second Intifada. Following the end of the Second Intifada in 2005, Israel handed the sectors of Area A that it controlled back to the Palestinian Authority. Israeli army first withdrew from Jericho, followed by Tulkarm and Jenin soon afterwards.

Since then, the Israeli military has regularly entered the area, usually at night, to conduct raids to arrest those suspected of involvement in attacks. Such raids are typically coordinated with Palestinian National Security Forces. In recent years, there have been discussion of deepening security cooperation between the IDF and the PA despite lack of diplomatic progress.

As of 2025, Israeli citizens and residents without permits continue to be strictly prohibited by the Israeli Police and the lower level of the IDF from entering Area A. However, the lower level of the IDF alleged preferential treatment, in that the Civil Administration (also part of the IDF) "looks the other way when Arab-Israeli civilians show up [unpermitted] at Area A checkpoints." However, the Citizenship and Entry into Israel Law has disproportionately denied citizenship to Arab citizens of Israel, which limits their options to a laissez passer permit to travel abroad.
