= Kisan, Palestine =

Kisan
- Municipality type D (Village council)

Arabic transcription(s)
  - Latin: Kisan
- Location of Kisan within Palestine
- Coordinates: 31°36′40″N 35°13′28″E
- State: State of Palestine
- Governorate: Bethlehem

Government
  - Type: Village council

Population (2017)
  - Total: 560

Kisan (Arabic: كيسان) is a Palestinian village located in the Bethlehem Governorate of the State of Palestine, in the southern West Bank. In 2017, its population was 560, according to the Palestinian Central Bureau of Statistics. The village came under Israeli occupation after the 1967 Six-Day War. Israel has constructed the Separation Wall across Kisan, confiscating 65.5% of the village total area for Israeli settlements. The remaining area of the village is surrounded by the Wall, Israeli military installations and several illegal Israeli settlements and outposts, including Ma'ale Amos, Mitzpe Shalem and Abei Hanahal, constructed on large areas of private land expropriated from Palestinian owners.

== History ==
Since the Six-Day War in 1967, Kisan has been under Israeli occupation. It is one of the villages of the sedenterized Ta'amireh.

A project committee from the Palestinian Ministry of Local Government was established in Kisan in 1997, and later turned into a 9-member village council.

== Attacks by settlers ==
The inhabitants of Kisan face violence from nearby settlers on an almost-daily basis.

On 24 June 2022, Israeli settlers desecrated the local mosque, breaking its doors, entering it and raising Israeli flags atop the religious building.

On 11 January 2025, 30 Israeli settlers attacked Palestinian farmers and sheep breeders in the settlement, beating them and burning their property.
