= Har Brakha =

Israeli settlement in the West Bank

Har Brakha: הַר בְּרָכָה (Hebrew)
- Etymology: Mount of Blessing
- Location within the Northern West Bank
- Coordinates: 32°11′34″N 35°15′55″E
- Country: Israel
- District: Judea and Samaria Area
- Council: Shomron
- Region: West Bank
- Founded: 1983
- Founder: Nahal
- Population (2024): 3,486
- Website: https://yhb.co.il/

Har Brakha, more commonly spelled Har Bracha (Hebrew: הַר בְּרָכָה, lit. 'Mount [of] Blessing') is an Israeli settlement located on the southern ridge of Mount Gerizim at an elevation of 870 metres (2,850 feet) above sea level, in the West Bank's Samarian Mountains, near the Palestinian city of Nablus. Har Brakha is named after one of the two mountains that are mentioned in Deuteronomy on which half of the twelve tribes of Israel ascended in order to pronounce blessings, and shares the Mount Gerizim ridge with Kiryat Luza, the main Samaritan village. It is organised as a community settlement and falls under the jurisdiction of Shomron Regional Council. In 2024 it had a population of 3,486.

The rabbi of Har Bracha and the Har Bracha Yeshiva is Rabbi Eliezer Melamed, author of the Peninei Halakha book series.

The international community considers Israeli settlements in the West Bank illegal under international law. The Israeli government disputes this.

According to the ARIJ, the land of Har Brakha was confiscated by the Israelis from three nearby Palestinian villages: mostly from Burin, but also from Kafr Qallil and Iraq Burin.

== History ==
Har Brakha was first established as a pioneer Nahal military outpost, and demilitarized when turned over to residential purposes on Yom Ha'atzmaut (Independence Day) in 1983. The rapid expansion of the village is universally attributed to the local national-religious Rabbinic school, Yeshivat Har Brakha, which was built in 1991 as well as its head or rosh yeshiva, Rabbi Eliezer Melamed, who is also the chief rabbi of Har Brakha. While the vast majority of students (about 150 annually) are not originally from settlements, many graduates of the yeshiva return to live in the settlement.

Evangelical Christians from the United States have joined the community, with the support of Rabbi Melamed, and their presence has aroused some controversy among residents.

== Neighborhoods ==
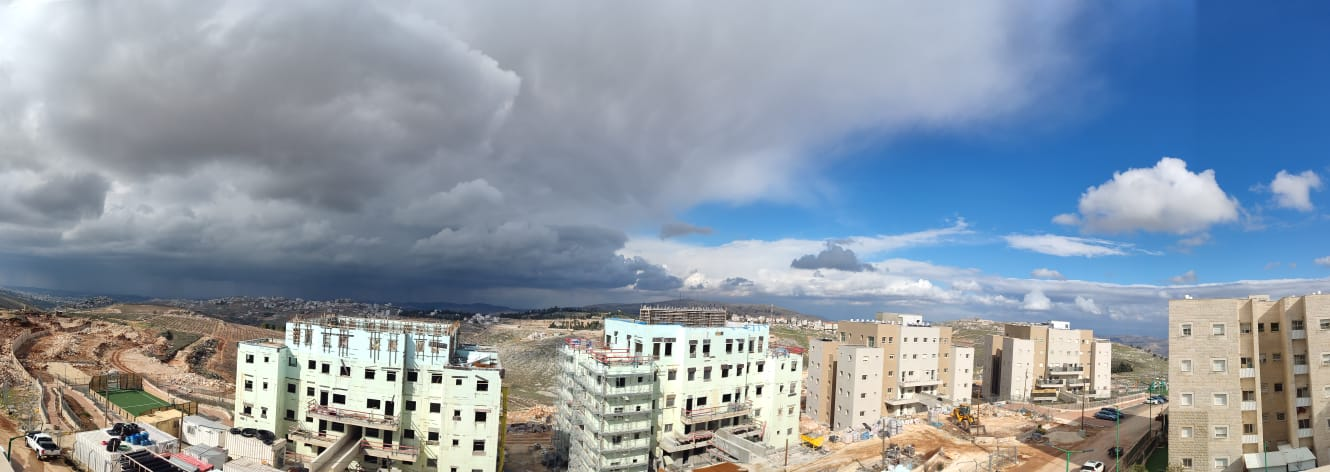
The view from the neighborhood of the buildings on Har Bracha

After the construction of several hundred private houses on Har Bracha, the members of the settlement decided to start building four-, five- and six-story buildings. This decision was made in order to lower the price for apartments and give young couples the opportunity to buy flats in the village. As part of the construction, a boys school and a girls school were also established in Har Bracha, together with eleven kindergartens.
