= Peninei Halakha =

Series of halakha books by Rabbi Eliezer Melamed

- Author: Eliezer Melamed
- Original title: פניני הלכה
- Country: Israel
- Language: Hebrew (original)
- Genre: Halakha
- Publisher: Har Bracha Institute
- Published: 1993–present
- Media type: Print, digital
- No. of books: 22 (Hebrew)

Peninei Halakha (Hebrew: פניני הלכה) is a series of halakha books, published by the Har Bracha Institute and written by Rabbi Eliezer Melamed, consisting of twenty-two volumes in Hebrew. The series is intended to encompass all the halakhot required today for a Jew. The series was founded on the basis of halakha segments that Rabbi Melamed delivered on Channel 7 in Israel, which began to be turned into books in 1993.

The books have been translated into English (10 volumes), French (13 volumes), Spanish (13 volumes), and Russian (15 volumes). The books are distributed digitally for free on the internet, and the license for using excerpts from the book is non-commercial.

In addition, based on the book series, comic books titled "Peninei Halakha for Children" (13 volumes) were written.

For writing this series, Melamed won several awards for Torah writing in Israel, including: the Katz Prize, the Jewish Creativity Prize, and the Rabbi Kook Prize.
