= Burin, Nablus =

Burin
- Municipality type C

Arabic transcription(s)
  - Arabic: بورين
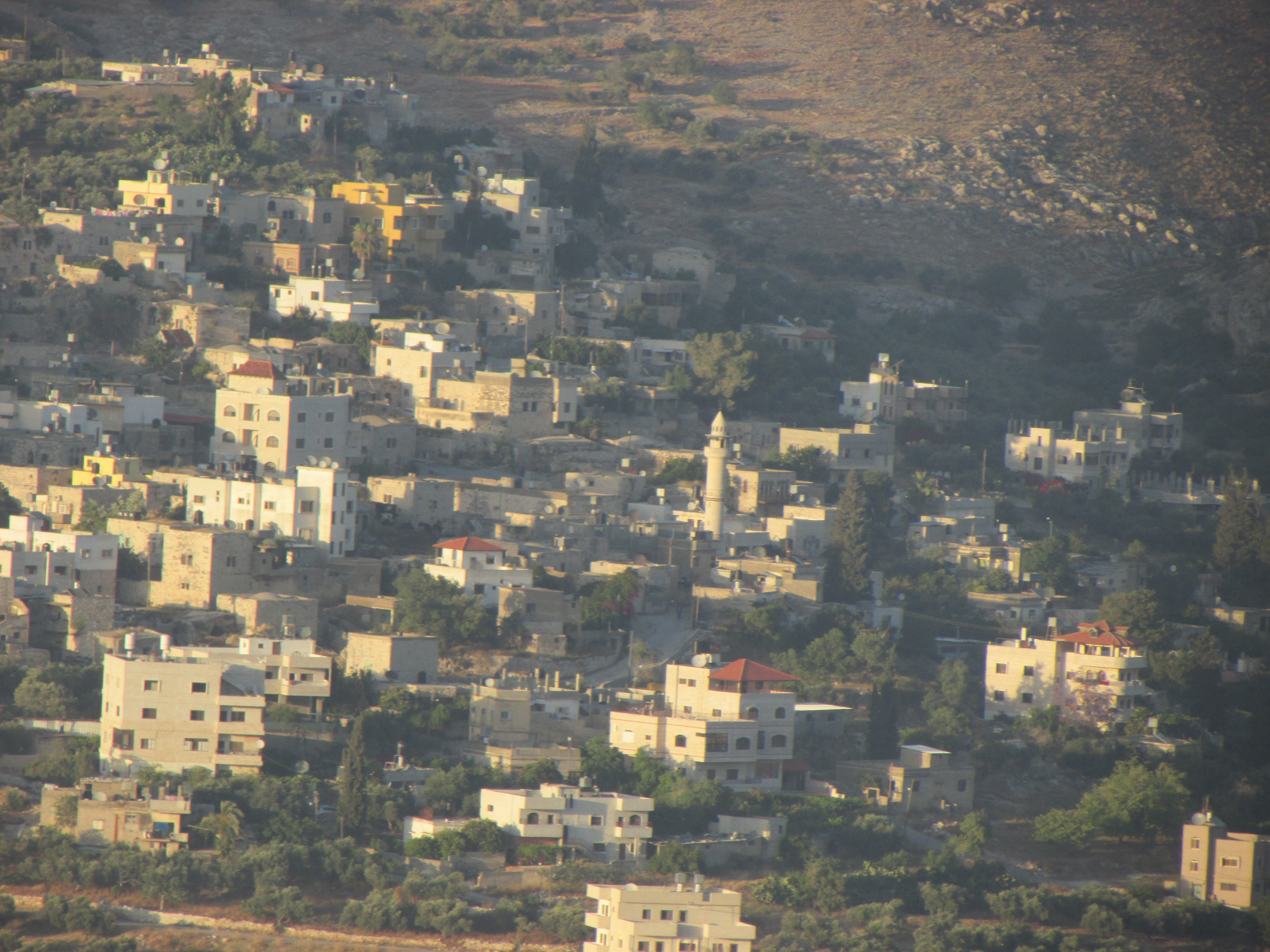
- View of Burin, 2014

- Location of Burin within Palestine
- Coordinates: 32°11′03″N 35°14′59″E
- Palestine grid: 173/176
- State: State of Palestine
- Governorate: Nablus

Government
  - Type: Municipality

Population (2017)
  - Total: 2,844
- Name meaning: from the Arab word for pit?
- Website: www.burin.org.ps

Burin (Arabic: بورين) is a Palestinian village in the Nablus Governorate of the State of Palestine, in the northern West Bank, located 7 kilometres (4.3 mi) southwest of Nablus. The town had a population of 2,844 in 2017.

== History ==
The name itself may conserve the toponym of Beera mentioned in the Book of Judges 9:21.

The Samaritan chronicle called the Tolidah records the settlement of a Samaritan called 'Adan son of Muqashshat from the Bene Zabad sons of Ge'al at Mahanaya ha-Elyona (Arabic Khirbet Makhna al-Fauqa) within the lands of Burin.

By the 12th and 13th centuries, during the Crusader era, Burin was inhabited by Muslims, according to the historian Diya al-Din al-Maqdisi. In 1176, a part of the tithes from the village was pledged to the Church of Mount Zion, but there is no evidence that it was ever collected.

The progenitor of the Banu Ghawanima family, Shaykh Ghanim, was born in Burin in 1166 and entered Jerusalem with Saladin's army in 1187. He was appointed as the sheikh of the city's al-Khanqah al-Salahiyya Mosque founded by Saladin in 1187 and he and his descendants served as the head judges of the Shafi'i fiqh (Islamic school of law) in Jerusalem. The Ghawanima Minaret (commons) and Bab al-Ghawanima gate (commons) of the Haram esh-Sharif were both named after the family.

=== Ottoman era ===
Burin was incorporated into the Ottoman Empire in 1517 with all of Palestine, and in 1596 it appeared in the tax registers as being in the nahiya of Jabal Qubal, part of the Nablus Sanjak. It had a population of 120 households and five bachelors, all Muslim. They paid a fixed tax rate of 33.3% on a number of crops, including wheat, barley, summer crops, olives, and goats or beehives, and a press for olives or grapes; a total of 26,445 akçe. The family of the Damascene scholar al-Hasan al-Burini (d. 1615) hailed from Burin.

The village was destroyed during conflicts involving Daher al-Umar, but it was likely rebuilt shortly afterwards. In 1838, it was noted as Baurin, located in Jurat Amra, south of Nablus. Robinson further noted that it was "a large village, or rather a market town."

In 1870/1871 (1288 AH), an Ottoman census listed the village in the nahiya (sub-district) of Jamma'in al-Thani, subordinate to Nablus. In 1882, the PEF's Survey of Western Palestine described Burin as a "large village in a valley, with a spring in the middle and a few olives."

=== British Mandate era ===
In the 1922 census of Palestine conducted by the British Mandate authorities, Burin had a population of 901, all Muslims, while in the 1931 census it had 215 houses and a population of 859 Muslims.

In the 1945 statistics, Burin (with Iraq Burin) had a population of 1,200, all Muslims, with 19,096 dunams of land, according to an official land and population survey. Of this, 1,797 dunams were plantations and irrigable land, 8,741 used for cereals, while 106 dunams were built-up (urban) land.

=== Jordanian era ===
In the wake of the 1948 Arab–Israeli War, and after the 1949 Armistice Agreements, Burin came under Jordanian rule.

The Jordanian census of 1961 found 2,068 inhabitants in Burin.

=== Post-1967 ===
Since the Six-Day War in 1967, Burin has been under Israeli occupation.

After the 1995 accords, 20% of the village land was classified as Area B, the remaining 80% as Area C. Israel has confiscated land from Burin in order to construct 2 Israeli settlements: 621 dunams for Bracha, and 233 dunams for Yizhar.

== Demographics ==
In the 1997 census by the Palestinian Central Bureau of Statistics (PCBS), Burin had a population of 1,915. Palestinian refugees and their descendants accounted for 57.1% of the inhabitants. According to the PCBS, the town had a population of 2,573 inhabitants in mid-year 2006. The town had a population of around 2,800 in 2008.

Most of the locals in Asira al-Qibliya, another village in the vicinity, have their origins in Burin.

== Expropriation and settler violence ==
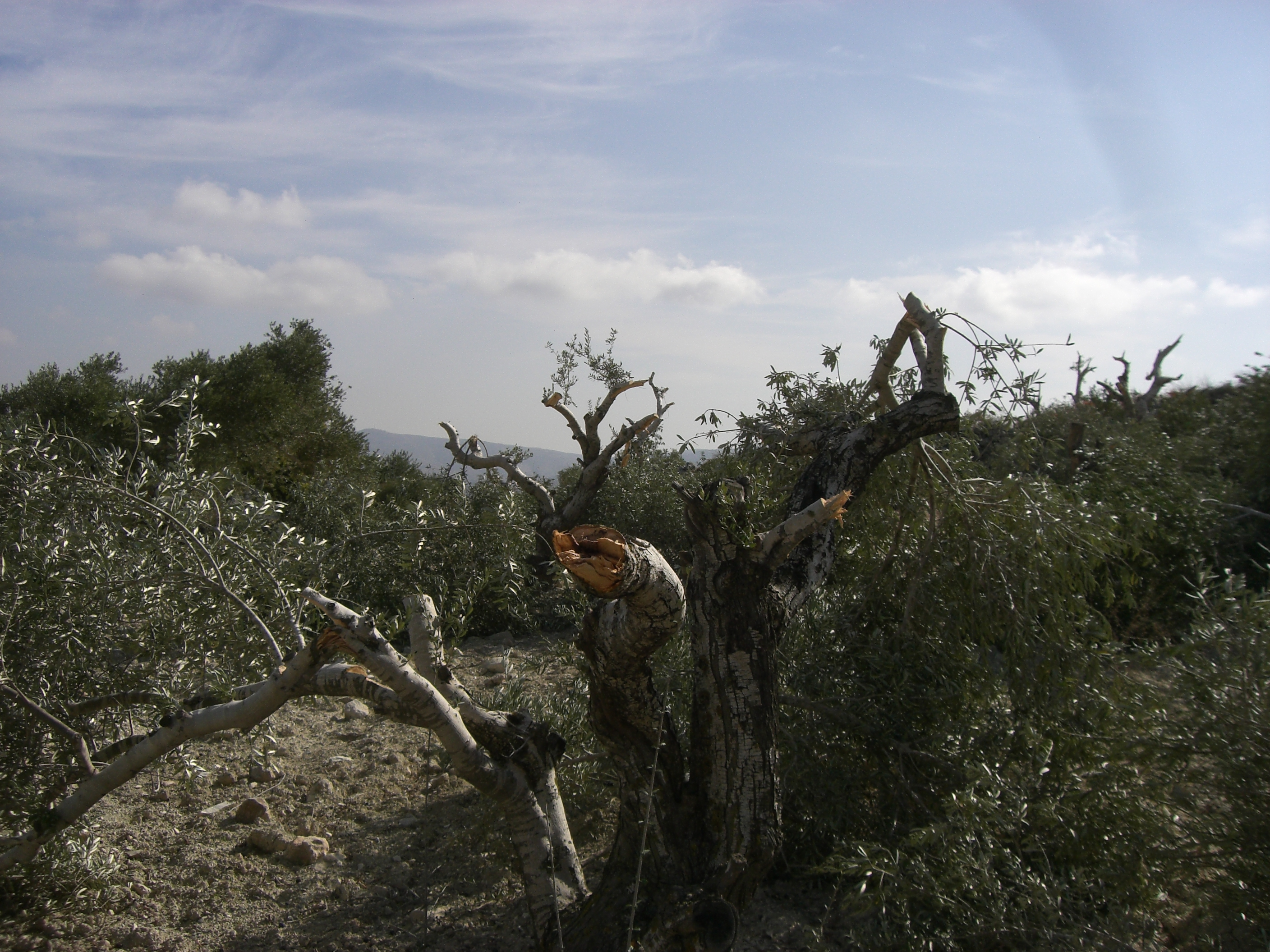
According to villagers and a Palestinian official, on November 12th, 2009, settlers from the Yitzhar settlement cut down or uprooted between 81 and 97 olive trees.

The land and water resources of Burin has gradually been reduced since the 1967 Israeli occupation, due to the expropriation for Israeli settlements and military bases. Since 1982, more than 2,000 dunams of Burins land was first declared "state land" and then handed over to the settlers of Har Brakha.

In 2008, a yeshiva student from Yitzhar was arrested after a failed rocket attack on Burin. After Israeli police demolished a trailer home in Adei Ad, a group of settlers from Yitzhar vandalized cars, smashed windows and cut electricity wires in Burin. From mid-June 2008 to August 2008 the human rights group Yesh Din documented nine attacks on Palestinian families living in Burin allegedly carried out by settlers living in outposts near Yitzhar or Har Brakha. Cases of "disturbances of the peace", a term referring to harm caused to Palestinians and their property, as well as harm to Israeli security forces, by Israeli citizens, rose in 2008, with 429 incidents in the first half of 2008, compared with 587 incidents in all of 2006 and 551 in 2007.

In February 2010, an 18-year-old Palestinian from Burin was shot and wounded by a settler security guard, which the settlers said took place after Palestinians threw stones at them.

There has been several attacks from Israeli settlers in Burin. Olive harvest days are coordinated with Israel, the Palestinian Authority and large clans in the area to prevent violence and vandalism. 7,714 Palestinian-owned trees were damaged during the first months of 2013. According to a report by Yesh Din, Burin had lost the most trees. A spokesman for the Israeli governing body in the West Bank said that were also cases where Palestinians has damaged trees owned by Israel, but they were fewer.

In 2019, Jewish settlers physically assaulted Israeli human rights activists in Burin. The human rights activists had arrived at the village to assist Palestinian farmers to harvest their olive trees and were attacked by masked assailants with iron rods and hurled stones. Three days later, another incident took place in Burin as masked settlers again promoted a stone attack against Palestinian farmers on Palestinian agricultural land near Burin; two Palestinians were harmed and taken to a hospital in Nablus, and none of the settlers were arrested.

In 2022, Israeli human rights activists were again attacked by Jewish settlers near Burin, where the activists had come to help Palestinian farmers plant trees in areas that had been damaged or vandalized in previous attacks. Seven of the Israeli activists were wounded by the settlers in the attack, which was labeled by the Israeli public security Minister as "terrorism".

Ghassan Najjar is a community leader in Burin. He is the founder of the Land and Farming Agricultural Collective, which promotes the concepts of agroecology, food sovereignty and environmental issues among farmers and shepherds. The organisation also promotes the preservation of local Palestinian culture in response to Israeli oppression, including through the organisation of an annual kite festival. Najjar is also the creator and coordinator of Sumoud, a network supporting farmers and shepherds. This includes defending their rights to access their lands, and building community resilience in response to the Israeli occupation of the West Bank, settler violence and displacement.

== Bibliography ==
- Auld, Sylvia; Hillenbrand, R.; Natsheh, Yusuf (2000). Ottoman Jerusalem: The Living City, 1517-1917. Altajir World of Islam Trust. ISBN 9781901435030.
- Barron, J.B., ed. (1923). Palestine: Report and General Abstracts of the Census of 1922. Government of Palestine.
- Conder, C.R.; Kitchener, H.H. (1882). The Survey of Western Palestine: Memoirs of the Topography, Orography, Hydrography, and Archaeology. Vol. 2. London: Committee of the Palestine Exploration Fund.
- Ellenblum, R. (2003). Frankish Rural Settlement in the Latin Kingdom of Jerusalem. Cambridge University Press. ISBN 9780521521871.
- Government of Jordan, Department of Statistics (1964). First Census of Population and Housing. Volume I: Final Tables; General Characteristics of the Population (PDF).
- Government of Palestine, Department of Statistics (1945). Village Statistics, April, 1945.
- Hadawi, S. (1970). Village Statistics of 1945: A Classification of Land and Area ownership in Palestine. Palestine Liberation Organization Research Center.
- Hütteroth, W.-D.; Abdulfattah, K. (1977). Historical Geography of Palestine, Transjordan and Southern Syria in the Late 16th Century. Erlanger Geographische Arbeiten, Sonderband 5. Erlangen, Germany: Vorstand der Fränkischen Geographischen Gesellschaft. ISBN 3-920405-41-2.
- Mills, E., ed. (1932). Census of Palestine 1931. Population of Villages, Towns and Administrative Areas. Jerusalem: Government of Palestine.
- Mullazadih, Muhammad Hani (2013). "Al-Burini, Hasan ibn Muhammad Dimashqi Saffuri". In Adel, G.H.; Elmi, Mohammad Jafar; Taromi-Rad, Hassan (eds.). Historians of the Islamic World: Selected Entries from Encyclopedia of the World of Islam. London: EWI Press. pp. 45–48. ISBN 978-1-908433-12-1.
- Moudjir ed-dyn (1876). Sauvaire (ed.). Histoire de Jérusalem et d'Hébron depuis Abraham jusqu'à la fin du XVe siècle de J.-C. : fragments de la Chronique de Moudjir-ed-dyn.
- Palmer, E.H. (1881). The Survey of Western Palestine: Arabic and English Name Lists Collected During the Survey by Lieutenants Conder and Kitchener, R. E. Transliterated and Explained by E.H. Palmer. Committee of the Palestine Exploration Fund.
- Robinson, E.; Smith, E. (1841). Biblical Researches in Palestine, Mount Sinai and Arabia Petraea: A Journal of Travels in the year 1838. Vol. 3. Boston: Crocker & Brewster.
- Röhricht, R. (1893). (RRH) Regesta regni Hierosolymitani (MXCVII-MCCXCI) (in Latin). Berlin: Libraria Academica Wageriana.
