= Tell, Nablus =

Tell
- Municipality type D (Village council)

Arabic transcription(s)
  - Arabic: تلّ
  - Latin: Tel (official); Tall (unofficial)
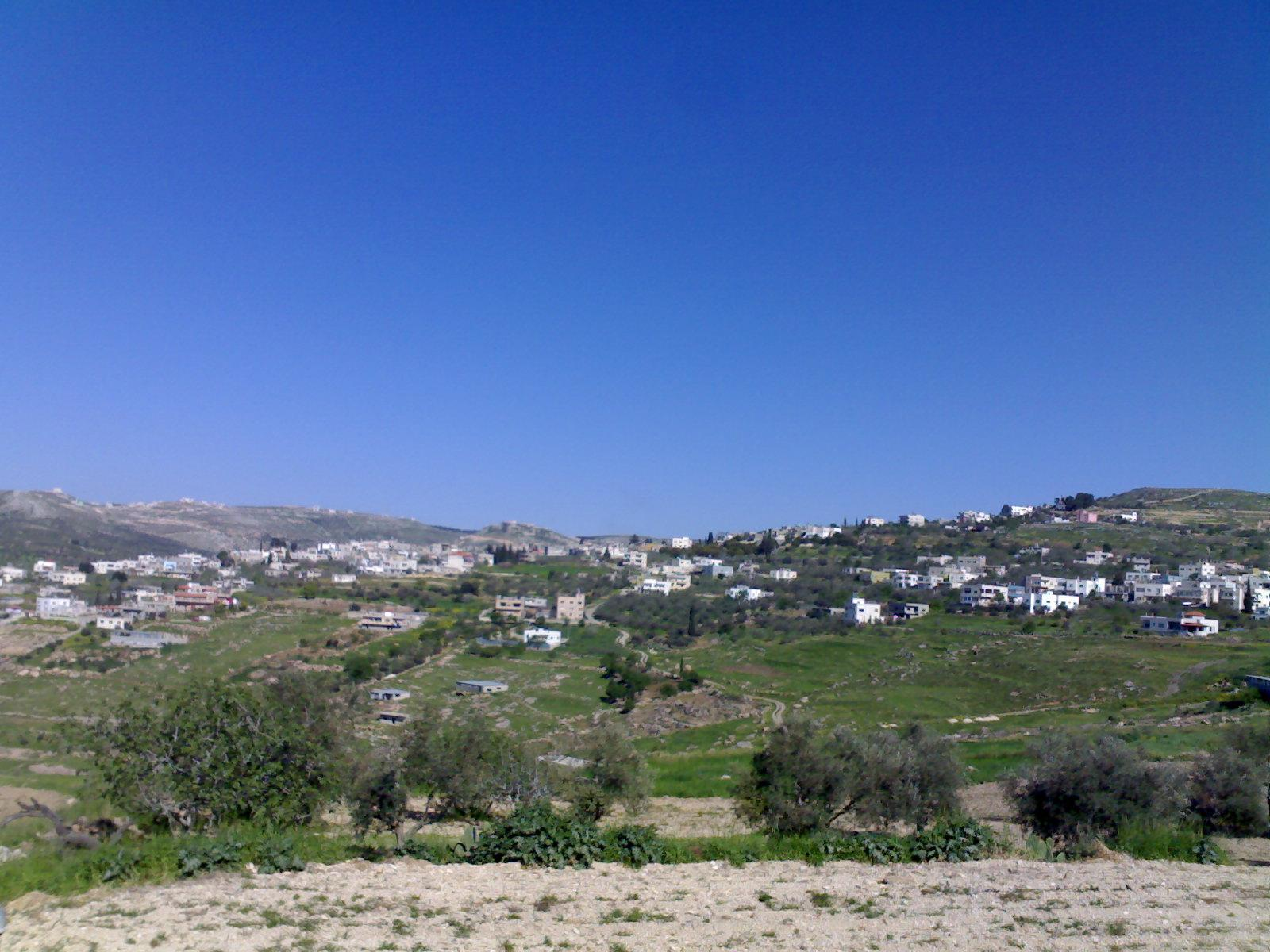
- Tell

- Location of Tell within Palestine Tell (the West Bank)
- Coordinates: 32°12′03″N 35°12′47″E
- Palestine grid: 170/178
- State: State of Palestine
- Governorate: Nablus

Government
  - Type: Village council
  - Head of Municipality: Omar Abdel Latif Eshtaia

Area
  - Total: 13.8 km^{2} (5.3 sq mi)

Population (2017)
  - Total: 5,162
  - Density: 374/km^{2} (969/sq mi)
- Name meaning: "Mound"

Tell (Arabic: تلّ), pronounced Till_{,} is a Palestinian town in the Nablus Governorate in northern West Bank, located five kilometers southwest of Nablus. According to the Palestinian Central Bureau of Statistics (PCBS), the town had a population of 5,162 inhabitants in 2017. Most of the town's laborers work in agriculture, with figs and olives being the major source of income.

Mohammad Shtayyeh, a Palestinian economist and politician, was born in Tell.

== History ==
Ceramics from the Byzantine era have been found here.

=== Ottoman era ===
In 1517, the village was included in the Ottoman Empire with the rest of Palestine, and it appeared in the 1596 tax-records as Till, located in the Nahiya of Jabal Qubal of the Liwa of Nablus. The population was 46 households, all Muslim. They paid a fixed tax rate of 33.3% on agricultural products, such as wheat, barley, summer crops, olive trees, goats and beehives, in addition to occasional revenues, a press for olive oil or grape syrup, and a fixed tax for people of Nablus area; a total of 5,100 akçe.

In 1838, Till was located in the District of Jurat 'Amra, south of Nablus.

In 1863, Victor Guérin found it to have a population of one thousand inhabitants. It was divided into several districts, each administered by a different sheikh. He further noted: "Some houses are large and fairly well built. Around the village grow, in pens, beautiful plantations of fig and pomegranate trees."

In 1870/1871 (1288 AH), an Ottoman census listed the village in the nahiya (sub-district) of Jamma'in al-Thani, subordinate to Nablus.

In 1882, the PEF's Survey of Western Palestine described Till as: "A village of moderate size on low ground, with a high mound behind it on the south; it has a well and a few trees, and on the west a pool in winter; the hills to the north are bare and white, but terraced to the very top."

=== British mandate era ===
In the 1922 census of Palestine conducted by the British Mandate authorities, Tel had a population of 567 Muslims, increasing in the 1931 census to 803 Muslims, in 209 houses.

In the 1945 statistics the population was 1,060 Muslims, while the total land area was 13,766 dunams, according to an official land and population survey. Of this, 1,056 dunams were for plantations and irrigable land, 7,023 for cereals, while 55 dunams were classified as built-up areas.

=== Jordanian era ===
In the wake of the 1948 Arab–Israeli War, and after the 1949 Armistice Agreements, Tell came under Jordanian occupation.

The Jordanian census of 1961 found 1,539 inhabitants.

=== Israeli occupation ===
Since the Six-Day War in 1967, Tell has been held under Israeli military occupation. Several Israeli settlements and outposts have been established on farmland and pastureland privately owned by Palestinians from Tell and nearby villages between Nablus and Qalqiliya. One of these is Havat Gilad (also known as Gilad Farm), which was established in 2002 as an outpost of Kedumim. On February 2018, the Israeli government authorized the retroactive approval of the outpost and decided to connect it to the electricity and water networks and pave an access road.

A report, This Is Ours – And This, Too, by B’Tselem and Kerem Navot, documented how agricultural outposts in the central West Bank have contributed to the loss of Palestinian access to farmland and pastureland, including through restrictions imposed around settlements and outposts. B'Tselem documented that the presence of Havat Gilad had contributed to restrictions on Palestinian access to agricultural land and settler attacks on Palestinian property. On October 2018, for example, farmers from Tell found that settlers had harvested olives from their trees and damaged olive saplings; the military restricted the farmers' access to their land for most of the year, allowing access for cultivation on only a limited number of pre-arranged days.

On 17 May 2022, Israeli settlers planted trees on privately owned Palestinian land in Tell and assaulted the landowner and residents who came to assist him. According to B'Tselem, Israeli soldiers subsequently attacked the Palestinian residents and detained several of them.

On 26–27 July 2022: Settlers attacked residents on village land, injuring five Palestinians; one of them was also beaten and detained for several hours by Israeli soldiers. The settlers burned a mobile structure owned by Muhammad Ahmad Hamdan and smashed a vehicle of Tell village council.

On 1 November 2022: Settlers stole olives from Palestinian-owned trees in Tell, alongside figs, and almonds.

On 13 October 2023, in the aftermath of the October 7 attacks, settlers, accompanied by Israeli soldiers, attacked Palestinian farmers harvesting olives in the Karkaba area west of Tell.

On 28 June 2025, Israeli settlers, accompanied by Israeli forces, attacked Palestinian homes in the Kafrūr area of Tell. Residents confronted the settlers, after which the IDF fired live ammunition and tear-gas canisters but no injuries were reported.

On September 2025, Peace Now reported that the Israeli Civil Administration had declared 455.58 dunams of land belonging to the villages of Tell, Jit and Far'ata as "state land" for the purpose of legalizing Havat Gilad. The underlying Civil Administration declaration, issued on 1 September 2025, designated the 455.58 dunams under Declaration of Government Property No. 2/25.

==== 2026 ====
On 23 February 2026, Israeli settlers torched the Abu Bakr al-Ṣiddiq Mosque between Tell and Surra. The entrance was burned and racist slogans were sprayed on its exterior walls.

On 6 April 2026: The United Nations Office for the Coordination of Humanitarian Affairs reported that settlers burned an agricultural structure and damaged water tanks, tools, and other water infrastructure in Tell and neighboring Asira al-Qibliya.

On 18 July 2026, Israeli settlers set fire to an inhabited Palestinian house and its surroundings in Tell. Palestinian firefighters reported that Israeli forces delayed their access to the area; by the time they arrived, the house had been completely destroyed. No injuries were reported.

Six days later, on the early morning hours of 24 July 2026, four Palestinian civilians were killed and four others wounded, three critically, when armed settlers allegedly attempted to burn a mosque, prompting residents to confront them, after which Israeli troops entered the village in aid of the settlers and fired live ammunition. During the altercation, a Palestinian villager, Farouq Ramadan, took the weapon of an Israeli settler and opened fire. The settler, who opened fire with a handgun, was killed, as well as a commander of the Israeli military force that had arrived. Farouq was then killed by the Israeli troops, as were two brothers and a cousin of Farouq. Israeli officials claimed that the settlers were on a hike when a Palestinian man stole a weapon from local security and opened fire. Palestinian officials stated that the men were defending their village from armed trespassers.

A video recording of the events revealed that during a confrontation, one of the settlers kicked a Palestinian man and yelled at him to back away. Settler minors recorded the chaos while cheering, whistling, and shouting: "An Arab is wounded, yes! Come on, revenge!". The Israeli government declared the incident as a "terror attack" and vowed retribution, including demolition of Ramadan's family home, expanding the construction of new settler outposts and "separating traffic routes and checkpoints between Israelis and Palestinians". The measures are an escalation of the widely documented discriminatory policies of Israeli apartheid in the West Bank as well as collective punishment by demolishing the family of the villager’s home, while the Israeli government disputes this designation.

On July 31st, the IDF shot a Palestinian who threw rocks as settlers marched through the village in memory of the 2 Israelis killed in the shootout a week prior. The IDF also said it received a report of settlers vandalizing a cemetery in the town.

== Bibliography ==
- Barron, J.B., ed. (1923). Palestine: Report and General Abstracts of the Census of 1922. Government of Palestine.
- Conder, C.R.; Kitchener, H.H. (1882). The Survey of Western Palestine: Memoirs of the Topography, Orography, Hydrography, and Archaeology. Vol. 2. London: Committee of the Palestine Exploration Fund.
- Dauphin, C. (1998). La Palestine byzantine, Peuplement et Populations. BAR International Series 726 (in French). Vol. III : Catalogue. Oxford: Archeopress. ISBN 0-860549-05-4.
- Government of Jordan, Department of Statistics (1964). First Census of Population and Housing. Volume I: Final Tables; General Characteristics of the Population (PDF).
- Government of Palestine, Department of Statistics (1945). Village Statistics, April, 1945.
- Guérin, V. (1875). Description Géographique Historique et Archéologique de la Palestine (in French). Vol. 2: Samarie, pt. 2. Paris: L'Imprimerie Nationale.
- Hadawi, S. (1970). Village Statistics of 1945: A Classification of Land and Area ownership in Palestine. Palestine Liberation Organization Research Center.
- Hütteroth, W.-D.; Abdulfattah, K. (1977). Historical Geography of Palestine, Transjordan and Southern Syria in the Late 16th Century. Erlanger Geographische Arbeiten, Sonderband 5. Erlangen, Germany: Vorstand der Fränkischen Geographischen Gesellschaft. ISBN 3-920405-41-2.
- Mills, E., ed. (1932). Census of Palestine 1931. Population of Villages, Towns and Administrative Areas. Jerusalem: Government of Palestine.
- Palmer, E.H. (1881). The Survey of Western Palestine: Arabic and English Name Lists Collected During the Survey by Lieutenants Conder and Kitchener, R. E. Transliterated and Explained by E.H. Palmer. Committee of the Palestine Exploration Fund.
- Robinson, E.; Smith, E. (1841). Biblical Researches in Palestine, Mount Sinai and Arabia Petraea: A Journal of Travels in the year 1838. Vol. 3. Boston: Crocker & Brewster.
