= List of Israeli price tag attacks =

Price tag attack policy
- Part of Ongoing Nakba
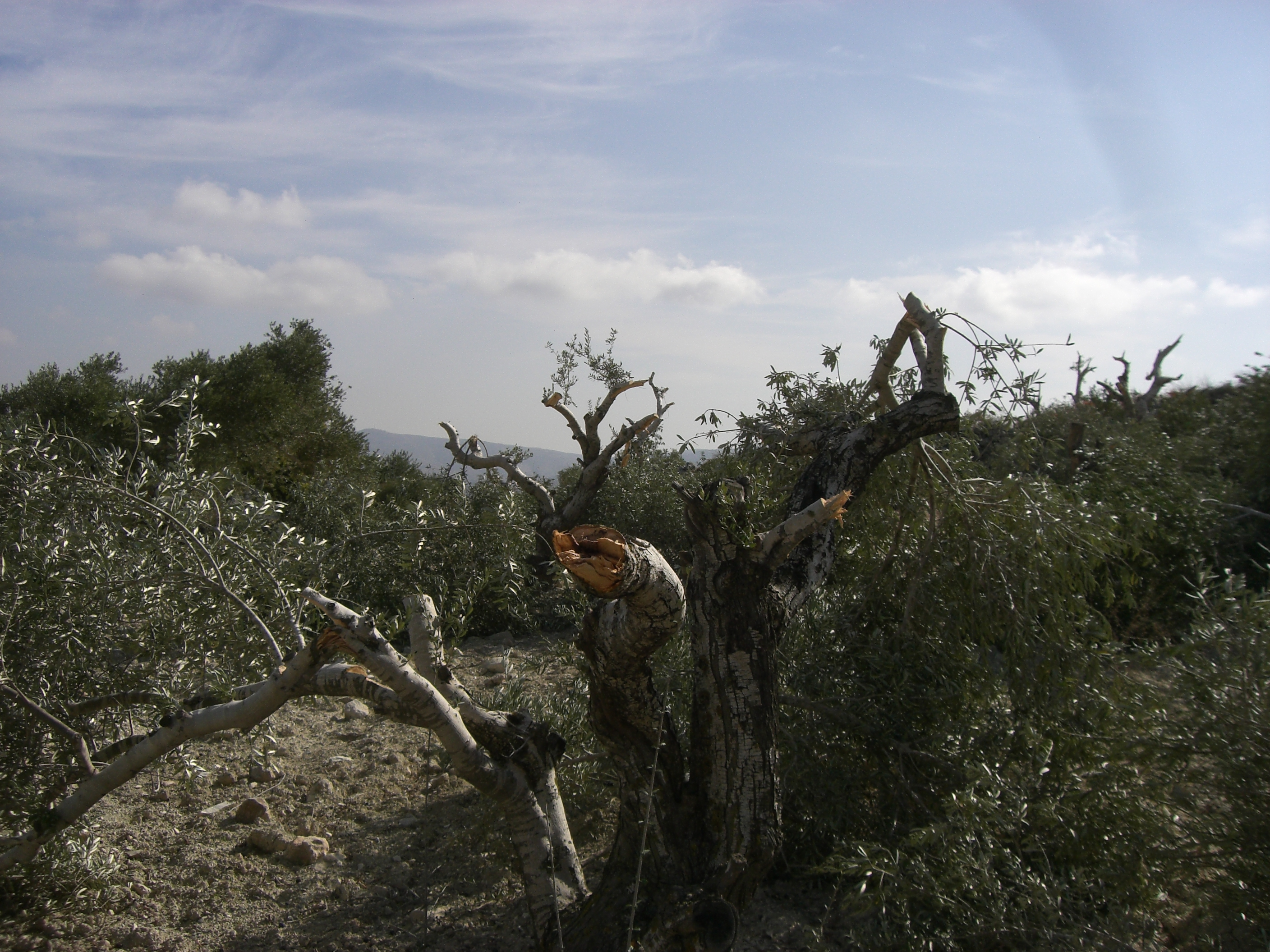
- Olive tree in the village of Burin which was allegedly vandalized by settlers from Yitzhar
- Native name: מדיניות תג מחיר
- Location: Occupied West Bank
- Date: July 23, 2008 – present
- Target: Palestinians
- Perpetrator: Hilltop Youth

This is a list of attacks reported or suspected price tag (Hebrew: מדיניות תג מחיר) attacks or violence aimed at the Palestinian population and at Israeli security forces by radical Israeli settlers, who, according to The New York Times, "exact a price from local Palestinians or from the Israeli security forces for any action taken against their settlement enterprise". The Wall Street Journal states that the term refers to "a campaign of retribution by fundamentalist Israeli youths against Palestinians in the West Bank". Over the period from January 2012 to June 2013, Israeli police registered 788 cases of suspected price tag assaults in which 276 arrests were conducted, leading to 154 indictments.

== 2008 ==
- 23 July 2008 – 20 settlers attack the Palestinian village of Burin, smashing cars and windows and cutting electricity wires, after the IDF evacuated settlers from a residence-bus in the illegal outpost of Adei Ad.
- October 2008 – After government attempts to evacuate outposts, settlers unleashed a dog against an Israeli company commander, broke the hand of a deputy battalion commander and punctured the tires of a vehicle of a reserve soldier.
- 4 December 2008 – After Israeli police evacuated settlers from Beit HaShalom in Hebron, settlers said they would implement a price tag policy, and three Palestinians, including a father and son, were wounded by gunfire, 12 others injured and 15 cars torched. Follow-up incidents in which settlers threw stones at road junctions, fired and vandalized Palestinian property, cut down olive trees, and slashed vehicle tires occurred in at least 12 other locations throughout the West Bank later that day.

== 2009 ==
- 1 June 2009 – Settlers blocked the main Qalqilya-Nablus road near the Qedumim settlement and stoned and assaulted Palestinian drivers trying to remove the debris, injuring 6, after a cell-phone alert had circulated the evening before warning that the Israeli army was about to evacuate the Ramat Gilad outpost, located east of the Qarnei Shomron settlement in the Qalqilya Governorate. Settlers also set fire that day to roughly 1,300 olive trees and 280 dunums of wheat and barley crops belonging to residents of Palestinian villages along Road 60 between the Qedumim and Yitzhar settlements. No evacuation was carried out.
- 20 July 2009 – After a few uninhabited structures in three settlement outposts in the Ramallah and Nablus governorates were removed by Israeli authorities, from over 1,000 to 1,500 olive trees belonging to villagers from Tell, Madama, Burin, Asira al-Qibliya and Jit were destroyed. Cars were stoned, junctions blocked, two Palestinian motorists were injured, and six vehicles damaged near Nablus in an attack attributed by Palestinians to settlers from Yitzhar.
- 23 July 2009 – Connected to the events three days earlier, over 20 armed settlers from an outpost near Yitzhar entered the village of Asira al-Qibliya and hurled stones at the villagers. When the villagers responded with stones, Israeli security forces arrived, fired sound bombs and teargas at them, resulting in the injury of one Palestinian boy.
- 9 September 2009 – After Israeli forces removed the temporary structures in the outpost of Ramat Haregel in the Hebron Governorate, more than 10 settlers from the Israeli settlement of Susiya, went to the neighbouring Palestinian village of that name, hurled stones and physically assaulted the villagers, resulting in injuries to 15 members of a family, including 10 children. After Israeli forces intervened, the settlers returned to Susiya, none were detained, and the outpost was reconstructed that night.
- 14 October 2009 – Some 200 olive trees belonging to the village of Al Mughayyir, were felled by settlers from the illegal settler outpost at Adei Ad, near Shvut Rachel.
- 9 December 2009 – The Hasan Khadr Mosque at the village of Yasuf near Salfit was burnt, with 'price tag' slogan written on the wall. In January 2010, several settlers from the Yitzhar settlement were arrested as suspects.

== 2010 ==
- April 2010 – Settlers torched three Palestinian vehicles in Huwara near Nablus.
- 4 May 2010 – Settlers torched the main mosque of the al-Lubban al-Sharqiyya village, its extensive carpets and Korans, south of Nablus.
- 12 May 2010 – Fundamentalist settlers torched an 11-Dunam olive orchard in al-Rababa valley, in Silwan, destroying three 300-year-old trees in the grove and damaging many others.
- May 2010 – Settlers from Asfar burned more than 200 trees belonging to Palestinians from the village of Sa'ir, near Hebron.
- 25 July 2010 – In retaliation for the government's demolition of two caravans and a goat pen at Givat Ronen, settlers embarked on a price tag mission involving protests, road blocks and an attempt to torch an open field. One villager of Burin was injured in clashes with the settlers, and four settlers were wounded, one seriously.
- 16 August 2010 – 250 olive trees in the villages of Kosra and Jaloud, near Nablus, were uprooted by settlers from Shvut Rachel, according to an official of the PNA.
- 3 October 2010 – Arsonists, suspected of coming from Gush Etzion, set fire to rugs, defaced a Koran, and scrawled 'revenge' on the walls of the mosque of Al Fajjar/Beit Fajar, near Bethlehem.
- 13–14 October 2010 – Two vehicles, owned by a Palestinians were set on fire in Qusra, and branded with a 'price tag' slogan, according to B'tselem.
- 15 October 2010 – A 500-dunam olive grove by the village of Farata was firebombed by settlers from the wildcat Jewish settlement of Havat Gilad as part of a price tag operation. According to eyewitness Rabbi Yehiel Grenimann, who notified authorities as the arson attack got underway, Israeli soldiers prevented fire trucks from entering to put out the blaze for an hour, and local Palestinians asking for their assistance were themselves detained for three hours.
- 19 October 2010 – Rabbis for Human Rights reported a girls' school at As-Sawiya was broken into, and a schoolroom burnt.

== 2011 ==
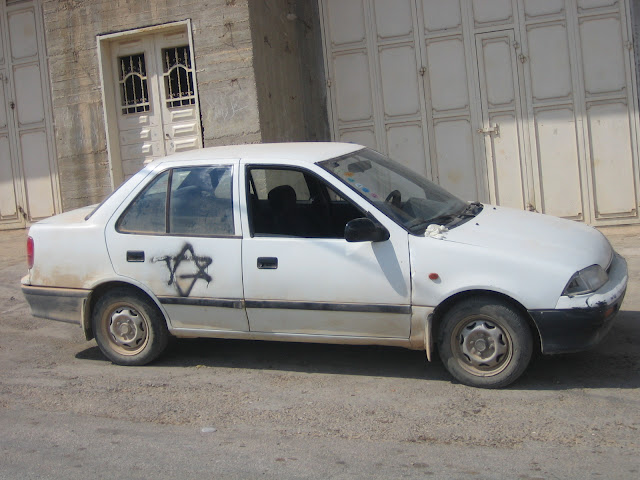
Vandalised car after "price-tag" attack by settlers, in September 2011.

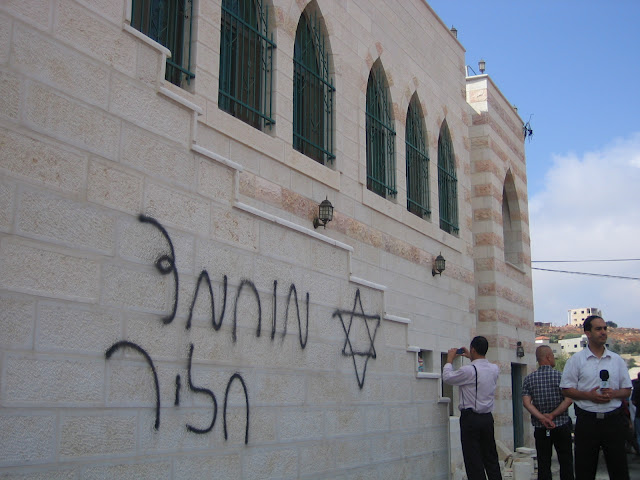
Hebrew text on the wall of the Qusra mosque, after "price-tag" attack by settlers, in September 2011

- 27 February 2011 – In a price-tag operation against the evacuation of Havat Gilad, settlers threw molotov cocktails at a house in the village of Huwara.
- 28 February 2011 – Dozens of windshields of Palestinian cars were smashed in Hebron in retaliation for the recent evacuation of Havat Gilad.
- 4 March 2011 – Settlers from Shvut Rachel damaged roughly 500 olive trees belonging to the village of Sorra, near Nablus, and stoned homes, apparently in reprisal for the dismantling of several mobile homes.
- 17 March 2011 – Five to seven Jewish men, using a metal pipe and tear gas, assaulted two Palestinian labourers renovating a house on the edge of the settlement of Shiloh. A Jewish security guard protecting them was also injured slightly.
- 6 June 2011 – A mosque was defaced and damaged by Israeli settlers in Al Mughayyir, near Ramallah.
- 25 July 2011 – Settlers torched the farmlands of the village of Sorra, after Israeli soldiers intervened to stop Israeli peace activists from preventing a group of settlers from uprooting trees, according to IMEMC.
- 5 September 2011 – Settlers torched the mosque of Qusra, south of Nablus.
- 7 September 2011 – Unknown perpetrators slashed the tires and cut the cables of 12 army vehicles at an IDF base, in retaliation for the demolition of 3 homes at the illegal settlement of Migron.
- 8 September 2011 – Settler youths made an attempt to deface the mosque of the village of Yatma, near Rechelim and Kfar Tapuach, in the Nablus Governorate in a price tag assault.
- 9 September 2011 – Graffiti slogans in Hebrew were sprayed on the Amir Hassan mosque in Birzeit and over a wall of the Birzeit University near Ramallah. The graffiti said:"Mohammad is a pig" and "death to Arabs".
- 11 September 2011 – house of a left-wing activist in Jerusalem defaced with graffiti proclaiming "death to the traitors" and "price tag Migron".
- 25 September 2011 – Roughly 100 olive trees felled in the village of Doma south of Nablus, in a suspected price-tag action.
- 28 September 2011 – A grove of 45 olive trees uprooted near Hebron, apparently in reprisal for the death of a settler and his son.
- 3 October 2011 – Burning of a mosque at the Bedouin town Tuba-Zangariyye in the North District of Israel.
- 5 October 2011 – Settlers Uprooted 200 Olive Tree at Qusra, near Nablus.
- 7 October 2011 – Two cemeteries – one Christian and one Muslim – in Jaffa desecrated with far-right graffiti, including "price tag" and "death to Arabs".
- 14 October 2011 – The Yitzchak Rabin memorial in Tel Aviv was desecrated, when a vandal sprayed the words "price tag" and "release Yigal Amir" on the memorial. The suspect, Shvuel Schijveschuurder, was later apprehended at the scene.
- 25 October 2011 – 20 trees from an olive grove at Beit Safafa owned by an Arab family of Jerusalem uprooted, with a price-tag sign posted nearby.
- 30 October 2011 – Vandals torched an Arab restaurant in Jaffa, and, according to a Tel Aviv-Yafo city council member, the phrases "price tag" and "Kahane was right." were scrawled on its walls.
- 7 December 2011 – Arsonists tried to set fire to the mosque of the Palestinian village of Burkina, near the settlement of Ariel, and also torched two Palestinian vehicles, in a suspected 'price tag' assault.
- 13 December 2011 – 50 settlers and right-wing Jewish activists broke into the Efraim Regional Brigade Headquarters near the settlement of Kedumim, damaging military vehicles, torching tires, hurling Molotov cocktails and throwing rocks. An IDF spokesman Brig.-Gen. Yoav Mordechai however refrained from using this term for the incident, noting that IDF Chief of General Staff Lt.-Gen. Benny Gantz has not used it for some time, and said that it needed to be defined correctly.
- 13–14 December 2011 – Arsonists torched the Nebi Akasha Mosque in Jerusalem marking the burial site of an Islamic prophet, Akasha bin Mohsin, in a suspected price tag action.
- 14–15 December 2011 – Arsonists defaced and torched the mosque at the Palestinian village of Burqa near Nablus, The slogans "Mitzpe Yitzhar" and "War", scrawled on the mosque suggest this was a 'price tag' retaliation for the dismantlement of the illegal settlement of Mitzpe Yitzhar conducted earlier by the IDF.
- 18 December 2011 – Hate slogans and the signature 'price tag' defaced the walls of the mosque of Bnei Naim, east of Hebron.

== 2012 ==
56 price tag attacks, the majority against Palestinians, took place in Jerusalem alone over 2012. Suspects were arrested for 12 such incidents, though not all of them were indicted. Some 623 price-tag related cases were investigated, involving 200 arrests and the filing of 123 indictments.

- 5 January – In what police described as a 'price tag' attack, a Palestinian car-wash Shuafat was set on fire, and a GMC minivan and a truck belonging to Palestinians also incinerated.
- 11 January – A mosque at the West Bank Palestinian village of Dir Istiyya was defaced with graffiti, reading 'Price tag' and 'Gal Arye Yosef' (an illegal outpost, demolished some days earlier, near Itamar),' in Hebrew, and three cars nearby were torched.
- 16 January – Mohammad Ghannam, brother of Ramallah's governor, Leila Ghannam, had his car torched outside Deir Dibwan village near Ramallah in a possible price tag operation.
- 7 February – In Jerusalem, a Jewish-Arab bilingual school, a symbol of coexistence, in which half the students are Jews and half are Arab, and the 11th-century Monastery of the Cross administered by the Greek Orthodox church were defaced with graffiti saying "Death to Arabs", "Kahane was right" and "Death to Christians" as well as "price tag". The two incidents, suspected of being 'price tag' attacks carried out by Jewish extremists, were later attributed to two Bedouin youths, who confessed to the acts.
- 20 February – Vandals daubed "Death to Christianity", "Jesus is dead", and "Mary was a prostitute" on the Jerusalem Baptist Narkis Street Congregation church, and slashed the tires of several cars parked in the compound. The acts were countersigned by price tag graffiti.
- 8 June – The tires of 14 cars were slashed and graffiti, including "death to Arabs", "revenge", "Kahane was right", "regards from Havat Gilad", "Ulpana neighbourhood", and "price tag", painted over the vehicles of residents of the Jewish-Arab village of Neve Shalom.
- 19 June – The 'Grand Mosque' the West Bank village of Jab'a was set alight and sprayed with the graffiti, "The war has begun", and "price tag", apparently in response to the evacuation of the Jewish settlement at Ulpana.
- 1 August – A Palestinian family in Sinjil, between the settlements of Shiloh and Ma'aleh Levona found plastic containers of benzene under their pickup truck, and a graffiti in Hebrew: "Don't you touch the lands" written on it.
- 23 August – Unidentified assailants, described by local Palestinians only as settlers wearing kippot, tried to torch two cars, after writing graffiti on them, in the West Bank village of Awarta.
- 27 August – A car was torched, and others sprayed with graffiti reading "Price Tag", "Migron", "death to the enemy"and "Revenge to Arabs", at Jalazone refugee camp north of Ramallah overnight after reports that settlers were in the area.
- 4 September – Graffiti reading "Jesus is a monkey" were sprayed on a Christian monastery, and its door was set on fire, at Latrun in a suspected price tag attack for the evacuation of Migron. In late June, 2013, police arrested a Bnei Brak resident on suspicion that he had been involved in the incident.
- 11 September – A mosque in Imrish, a Palestinian village near Hebron, was vandalized with the words "price tag" after the residents said that they kicked out Israeli settlers who tried to set a car on fire.
- 2 October – The entrance to the Church of the Dormition on Mount Zion was sprayed with graffiti that read "Jesus, son of a bitch, price tag."
- 22 October – A car was set on fire and graffiti, reading " price-tag Susia" and "regards from Meir Ettinger." sprayed on the entrance to a village in the Hebron area.
- 22 November – About 300 olive trees were destroyed near Hebron with graffiti messages read, “Price Tag” and “Regards from Beersheba and Tel Aviv”, spray-painted near to the damaged trees. The attack was believed to be a retaliation to the rocket attacks by Hamas during the 2012 Gaza War.
- 25 November – Eight Palestinian cars in Shuafat were vandalized with price-tag slogans that read: "Gaza Price Tag".
- 3 December – Three youths were arrested while endeavouring to vandalise property at the West Bank village of Samu'a, after apparently torching a car and spraying price-tag graffiti in the nearby town of ad-Dhahiriya.

== 2013 ==
From January to November, 120 price tag attacks against Arabs in the Binyamin /al-Bireh area of the north West Bank, leading one Israeli security official to state that these acts might have a destructive impact by motivating Palestinians to engage in terror. Whereas no Israeli had been killed in 2012, four had been murdered as of November 2013. From January to June 2013 165 cases involving price-tag attacks were opened, some 76 suspects were arrested and 31 indictments were filed.

- 1 January: Graffiti "Price tag. The only good Arab is a dead Arab. Vengeance for Yitzhar," and "This time on buildings, next time on humans", were sprayed on the village of Beit Umar, near Hebron.
- 3 January: In a village south of Nablus, four cars had their tires slashed, with the words "Solidarity with Esh Kodesh" (an Israeli outpost), and a Star of David spray-painted on a nearby wall.
- 5 February: Two cars were set on fired, and graffiti, reading "Jewish blood is not cheap. Tapuah is Kahane.", sprayed on a nearby wall, at Deir Jarir, east of Ramallah. Both the IDF and B'tselem assume the act was a price-tag incident. The slogan may refer to an incident in which a Jewish boy was knifed at Tapuah Junction, near Kfar Tapuah, where many followers of Meir Kahane live.
- 14 February: Price-tag" vandals, protesting demolitions at the Israeli outpost of Ma'ale Rehav'am in the West Bank, targeted an historic Muslim cemetery in Jerusalem by spraying Jewish stars and price tag slogans on 10 Muslim gravestones.
- 18 February: At Palestinian village of Yasuf near the settlement of Kfar Tapuah the tires of three cars were slashed and a wall daubed with the slogan "price tag, stone terror", according to local villagers by a carload of settlers.
- 21 February: Jewish extremists reportedly vandalized six cars, torching four of them, in the village of Qusra, according to B'tselem. IDF confirmation was lacking due to safety concerns over entering the village, but the Palestinian Prime Minister Salam Fayyad condemned both the incident as a "price tag" attack and also the IDF's demolition of electricity poles in Qusra a day earlier. Israeli Police later concluded the attack had been 'staged' by Palestinians based on forensic evidence as well an Israeli ID card, reported lost by a soldier, which Palestinians claimed to find at the scene. B'tselem replied that the police report was 'the quickest police investigation ever'
- 6 March: A Mevaseret Zion resident was arrested, while caught in the act, for vandalising Palestinian cars, and spraying "death to Arabs", in an industrial park in the Shiloh settlement near Jerusalem.
- 8 March: In Alsawiyah, near Tapuah. seventy-five olive trees were cut down to stumps. Another twenty-one mature olive trees were clear-cut. "Price Tag" was sprayed in the area, as well as illegible scrawlings, possibly "Non-Jewish Terrorism".
- 7 April: Vandals defaced two mosques, and slashed the tires of several cars in the Palestinian village of Tekoa, reportedly in retaliation for stone-throwing incidents, and in revenge for injuries from stoning sustained by a baby at the settlement of Ariel in the preceding month.
- 22 April: Overnight 15 Palestinian cars were torched in separate incidents ascribed to 'price tag' vandals. 11 of the cars were set alight in Deir Jarir, destroying four completely. No graffiti were found but local Palestinians blamed the vandalism on settlers.
- 23 April: Four vehicles owned by an Israeli-Arab were put to the torch at Akbara, a village near Safed. Graffiti reading "don't touch our girls price tag" were found nearby.
- 24 April: After a burglary of an Arab residence in Tel Aviv, graffiti reading "Death to Arabs" "Go away" and "Price tag" were found on the door of their apartment.
- 30 April: Settlers entered the village of Beit Ilu and sprayed "price tag" graffiti opn one of the homes.
- 13 May: Three cars were torched near a mosque at the village of Umm al-Qutuf in Wadi Ara. The mosque wall was defaced with graffiti reading "price-tag" together with a Star of David and "Evyatar",
- 15 May: It was reported that, some days earlier, vandals set fire to two cars in the village of Nein, near Afula, spraying price tag graffiti.
- 23 May: Price-taggers targeting Arabs also damaged Jewish property when five cars, three belonging to Arabs, two to Jews, in Gilo Jerusalem suffered tire-slashing, and "price tag" was sprayed nearby.
- 29 May: In a wave of attacks, five cars in the village of Zubeidat northeast of Jericho, and four in the village of Marj en-Naaja, were torched and sprayed with graffiti reading "30 days since Evyatar – may God avenge his death." Two cars were torched and sprayed with a similar sign at the village of Rantis, west of Ramallah. In Jerusalem, seven car had their tires punctured, four of the seven at French Hill, and three at the entrance to Shuafat. The graffiti read "Jewish blood is not cheap".
- 30 May: The tires of three cars were punctured in Beit Ilo with graffiti reading, "revenge", and on a nearby wall, undersigned with "price tag" the words "regards from Baruch Tzuri to Eviatar", alluding to a Yitzhar settler stabbed to death by a Palestinian at Tapuah Junction near Nablus on April 30.
- 30 May: Jerusalem's Dormition Abbey on Mount Zion was sprayed, for the second time in several months, with graffiti reading 'Jesus is a monkey', and the tires of two cars parked there were slashed, apparently in retribution for the dismantling of an illegal outpost, Havat Ma'on.
- 12 June: On several Orthodox Christian tombs the words "Price tag", and "revenge" were sprayed, at a Christian cemetery in Jaffa. Allusions were also made to two Bat Yam synagogues defaced with Nazis symbols in May.
- 13 June: Vandals set fire to two cars in a Sheikh Jarrah parking lot, in a price tag act police believe was racially motivated.
- 18 June: 'Arabs out' graffiti were sprayed and tires of 28 cars slashed at Abu Ghosh. One of the damaged vehicles belonged to former Knesset speaker Avraham Burg.
- 22 June: The tires of 21 Palestinian cars were punctured and slashed at Beit Hanina, accompanied by the graffiti, 'We do not keep silent over stone-throwing' and the Star of David.
- 21 July: An 11-year-old boy was arrested suspecting of slashing and vandalizing Palestinian cars with racist messages, including "Death to Arabs" and "price tag".
- 19 August: The hallway of the Beit Jamal Monastery near Beit Shemesh, run by the nuns of the Sisters of Bethlehem, was firebombed and the slogans "price tag", "death to the Gentiles", and "revenge" were sprayed on its walls.
- 22 September: 8 cars of Palestinian residents in the Sheikh Jarrah sector of East Jerusalem were vandalized by tire-slashing and spray painting of price tag slogans.
- 29 September: Vandals damaged seven vehicles of Palestinian residents of East Jerusalem, near the Tomb of Simeon the Just scratching them with keys and a screwdriver, the second incident in a week suspected to be undertaken as revenge attacks on Palestinians for Israel's policy on the West Bank. Two Jewish teenagers were subsequently arrested on suspicion of involvement.
- Police arrested four Jewish youths, two identified as Hilltop Youth, in the act of smashing 15 gravestones in the Christian cemetery near King David's Tomb in Jerusalem in order to prevent a fully-fledged 'price tag' attack from being carried out.
- 1 October: Vandals slashed the tires of five vehicles along Ma'ale HaShalom road, and sprayed 'price tag policy' on a nearby wall in Jerusalem's Old Quarter, near the house of a Palestinian family who were granted a stay of eviction from their home by the Israeli Supreme Court. It was the fifth such episode over the week.
- 10 October: The Palestinian elementary school of Jalud was attacked, reportedly by some 20 settlers, five cars owned by the teachers were damaged, and then the village's olive groves were set on fire, causing damage to 400 trees.
- 10 October: A mosque in the West Bank Palestinian village of Burqa was defaced with a slogan reading "Redemption of Zion loves Tomer Hazan", and three cars were set on fire in what is suspected to be a "price tag" attack. Tomer Hazan referring to an IDF soldier murdered in Qalqilyah in September.
- 14 November: A Palestinian home in the West Bank village of Sinjil was set alight, with five Palestinians suffering from smoke inhalation. Half the house was destroyed. The owners attributed the act to four settlers. On one of the walls, the slogan "Regards from Eden, Revenge" was painted. It is suspected it was a price tag assault partially to avenge the murder of a 19-year-old IDF soldier, Eden Attias, at Afula, earlier.
- 19 November: Two vehicles were torched and Stars of David were sprayed painted on the walls of the Palestinian village of Farata. In February 2014 three settlers from the West Bank outpost of Gilad Farm were arrested for an alleged responsible for the incident. On 1 December 2014 two residents of Havat Gilad, Yehuda Savir and Yehuda Lansberg, were convicted for the crime, after entering plea-bargain in which they gave evidence against a third accomplice, Binyamin Richter, in exchange for 30 months in prison and no fine.
- 8 December: The mosque of Baqa al-Gharbiyye in Israel was defaced by graffiti reading "Mohammed is a pig", "mutual responsibility", "Terror stones", and "regards from Boaz and David Chai", while the windshields of 5 nearby cars were shattered. Boaz and Chai refers to two settlers whose movements have been restricted by the IDF.

== 2014 ==
A steep rise in attacks occurred after April 2 following the demolition of illegal outposts in the Yitzhar settlement, with some 16 hate crimes taking place in little over a month, as compared to 17 registered in the preceding three months. From January through to mid May, the Israeli police unit for nationalist crimes, has opened 78 new files, arrested 102 suspects and served 37 indictments.

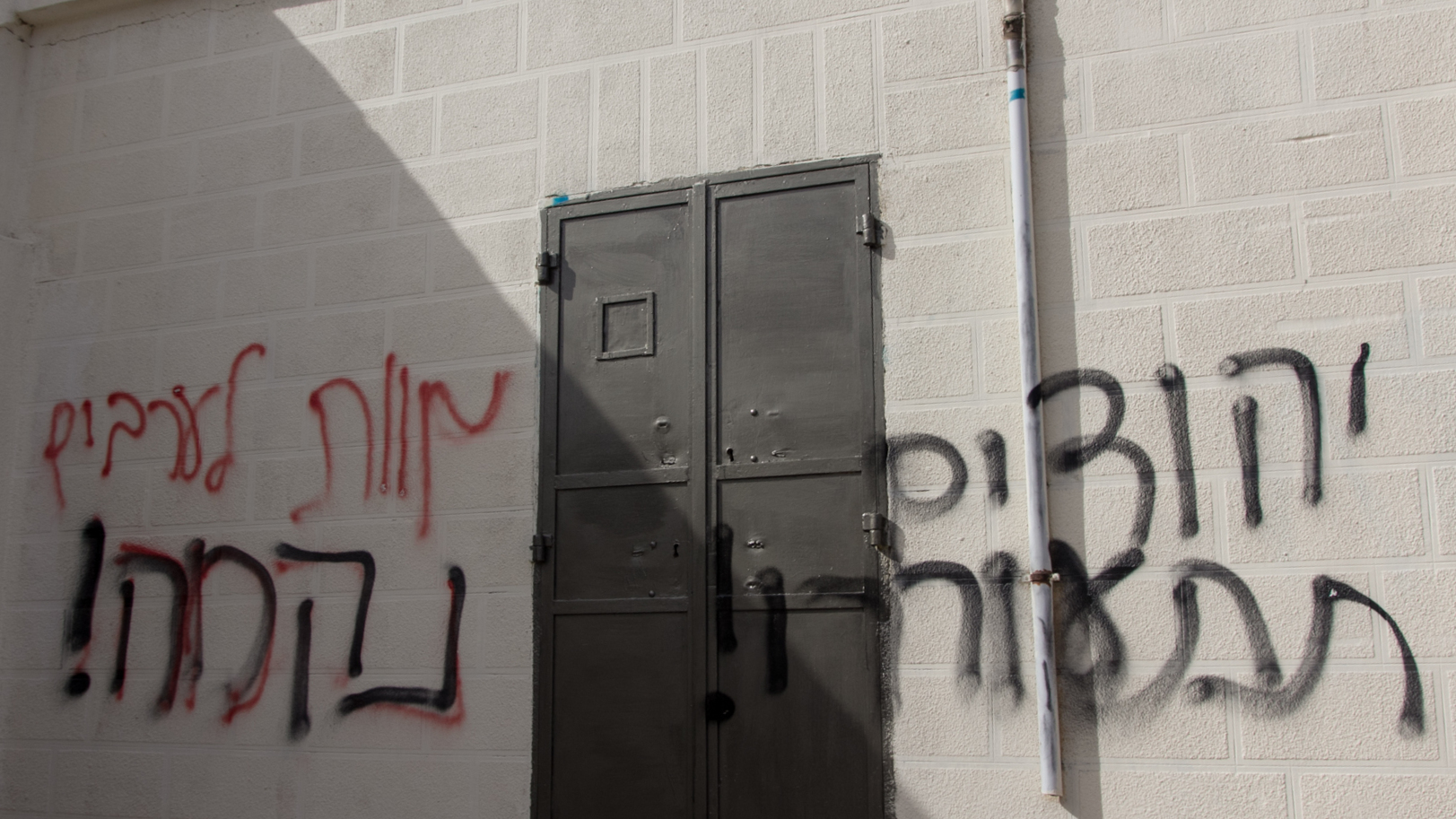
January 31, 2014, graffiti on a Palestinian house outside Ma'ale Levona. "Jews Wake Up!", "Death to the Arabs", "Revenge!"

- 6 January: In the village of Madama south of Nablus two Palestinian vehicles were burnt out and graffiti was found next to the cars reading "Esh Kodesh", "revenge", and price tag along with a Star of David
- 7 January: Cars were burnt and price tag graffiti, reading "Esh Kodesh", "revenge", and a Star of David, were sprayed in Madama, a Palestinian village south of Nablus.
- 8 January: 30 fruit trees were cut down in a Palestinian garden center next to Kfar Qassem. The site was blazed with the slogan "Regards Eish Kodesh."
- 15 January: A mosque in the village of Deir Istiya near Ariel was set fire to, and the slogans "Arabs Out", "Hi from Qusra' and "Revenge for spilled blood in Qusra" sprayed on its walls.
- 30 January: Vandals smeared graffiti on a synagogue affiliated to progressive Judaism at Ra'anana. The graffiti referred to those who 'rise up against God' and cited a passage in Maimonides that asserts renegades, heretics and deniers of Torah have no place in the world to come, unless they repent. Commentators interpreted this as a price tag attack.
- 9 February: 16 cars have their tires punctured and anti-Arab graffiti reading 'Arab labour', 'Enough of assimilation', were sprayed in the Ein Ilouza neighbourhood of Silwan.
- 20 February: A plant nursery in Kafr Qasim was vandalized by unknown vandals, spray painted with the words "buy just from Jews" and "price tag" on the property.
- 11 March: 19 cars in the Israel Arab town of Jaljulia had all their tires punctured, acid thrown on the vehicles and walls of newly built houses defaced with graffiti reading "Every Arab is a criminal" and "God is the King" in Hebrew, in what is described as a price tag attack.
- 24 March: The tires of 34 cars were slashed in a suspected price tag attack in the Arab suburb of Beit Hanina in East Jerusalem. It was the second such attack on the area within a year. Graffiti reading "Goyim in Israel = Enemies" was sprayed on a nearby bus.
- 1 April: The tires of four cars were slashed and on the walls of the Catholic monastery at Deir Rafat village, close to Kibbutz Tzora near Beit Shemesh. The graffiti read "America is Nazi Germany", "Price Tag", "Jesus is a monkey" and "Mary is a cow".
- 3 April: The slogan "Only non-Jews [should be] driven out of our land" was spray-painted on a wall and the tires of 40 cars were slashed in the predominantly Christian Israeli village of Jish in what Elias Elias, head of the Gush Halav Regional Council, described as 'price tag' damage.
- 18 April: The door of the Abu-Bakr Al-Siddiq mosque at Umm al-Fahm was set alight and a slogan reading "Arabs out" scrawled on its wall.
- 28 April: The tires of several local cars were slashed, and the Star of David, and an exhortation to "Close mosques, not yeshivas" were sprayed on a mosque in the Israeli Arab town of Fureidis. It was, according to the head of Tag Meir (Spreading the Light) Gadi Gvaryahu, the 31st case of a house of worship in either Israel or the West Bank being subject to desecration since 2009.
- 29 April: The tires of an Israeli Arab's car were slashed, and the doors painted with the Star of David, when the man left his car parked in the predominantly Jewish neighbourhood of Yokneam, the sixth such incident in the town in a month. An admirer of the ideas of Rabbi Meir Kahane was arrested on 7 May on suspicion of having damaged Arab cars in the town.
- 4 May: The tires of a car belonging to an Arab resident of Acre were slashed while it was parked at Ein HaShofet, and the vandals drew a Star of David together with "price tag" on one of the tires.
- 5 May: A column outside the Office of the Assembly of Bishops at the Notre Dame Center in East Jerusalem was smeared with a graffito in Hebrew: "Death to Arabs and Christians and all those who hate Israel".
- 5 May: Graffiti reading "price tag" and "Kahane was right" were sprayed on the walls of Arab property at the Israeli town of Kiryat Ye'arim.
- 7 May: A Druze had the windows of his dentistry practice scrawled over with the slogans "Death to Arabs" and "Greetings to Fureidis, Price Tag", in Yokneam.
- 9 May: Graffiti reading 'Price tag, King David is for the Jews, Jesus is garbage' were sprayed on the walls of the St. George Romanian Orthodox Church in Jerusalem.
- 16 June: The tires of an IDF military vehicle transporting toilets were slashed in an apparent price tag incident at the Yitzhar settlement.
- 19 June: A Haifa Arab-Israeli school was defaced with "price tag", "Death to Arabs" and invective against Knesset member Hanin Zoabi, and signs of an incendiary attempt were also visible.
- 23 June: Three cars in al-Ashqariya neighborhood of Beit Hanina had their tyres punctured, another four were deflated, with slogans "revenge" and "every Arab is the enemy" sprayed on them. Palestinian sources say 12 cars and a school bus were affected.
- 2 July: A Palestinian boy, Abu Khdeir was kidnapped, beaten up and torched to death after being doused with petrol, by three Israeli youths in what was deemed a price tag attack.
- 2 July: In the wake of the 2014 kidnapping and murder of Israeli teenagers, settlers who, according to Palestinian sources, hailed from the settlement of Itamar, sprayed the slogans "blood vengeance" and "price tag" on Fadi Basim Bani Jabir's sheep farm in Aqraba, and torched the steel structure fencing it. The sheep were saved.
- 9 August: Settlers reportedly burnt a minibus and sprayed 'price tag' on a wall in the village of Yasuf. Palestinian security sources claim that the attackers hailed from the settlement of Tapuach.
- 5–6 October: Dozens of olive trees were felled in the village of Yasuf and a further 15 were damaged in the village of Burin in a suspected pricetag attack. Settlers claim that the cuts were the result of Palestinian pruning, which "leftist Israelis" exploited to make a blood libel against the settlers. On 11 October police arrested two Israelis from Tapuach on suspicion of involvement in the assault.
- 14 October: The mosque of Aqraba, near the settlement of Itamar was torched by a firebomb and the graffiti "price tag Tapuach" was sprayed on a wall nearby.
- 11 November 2014: Vandals damaged several cars while spray-painted "No Arabs, no cars" at Beit Safafa in a suspected price-tag attack, in the wake of several incidents involving Palestinians ploughing two cars into crowds, a spate of attacks on Arabs, the knifing of two Jews, and police and IDF killings of protesting Palestinians.
- 12 November: Settlers reportedly torched the mosque at al-Mughayyir and spraypainted racist slogans at the site.
- 23 November: In a suspected price tag operation, settlers, attacking with Molotov cocktails and stun grenades, torched the home of the widow of Abd al-Karim Hussein Hamayil in Khirbet Abu Falah, scrawling "Death to the Arabs", and "Avenge the blood of the fallen servants" in Hebrew at the site.
- 29 November: The bilingual Jewish-Arab Max Rayne Hand in Hand school in the Pat Neighbourhood of Jerusalem was torched by vandals, who sprayed slogans like "enough with assimilation", "you can't coexist with a cancer", "Kahane was right" and "death to Arabs". Three Members of the radical right-wing group Lehava, Yitzah Gabay and the brothers Nahman and Shlomo Twitto, were arrested on suspicion of the arson on 6 December, and later admitted their culpability. One of their mothers said: "It's disgusting that Jews and Arabs learn side by side ... If we didn't have a country governed by law, I would have done the same."

== 2015 ==
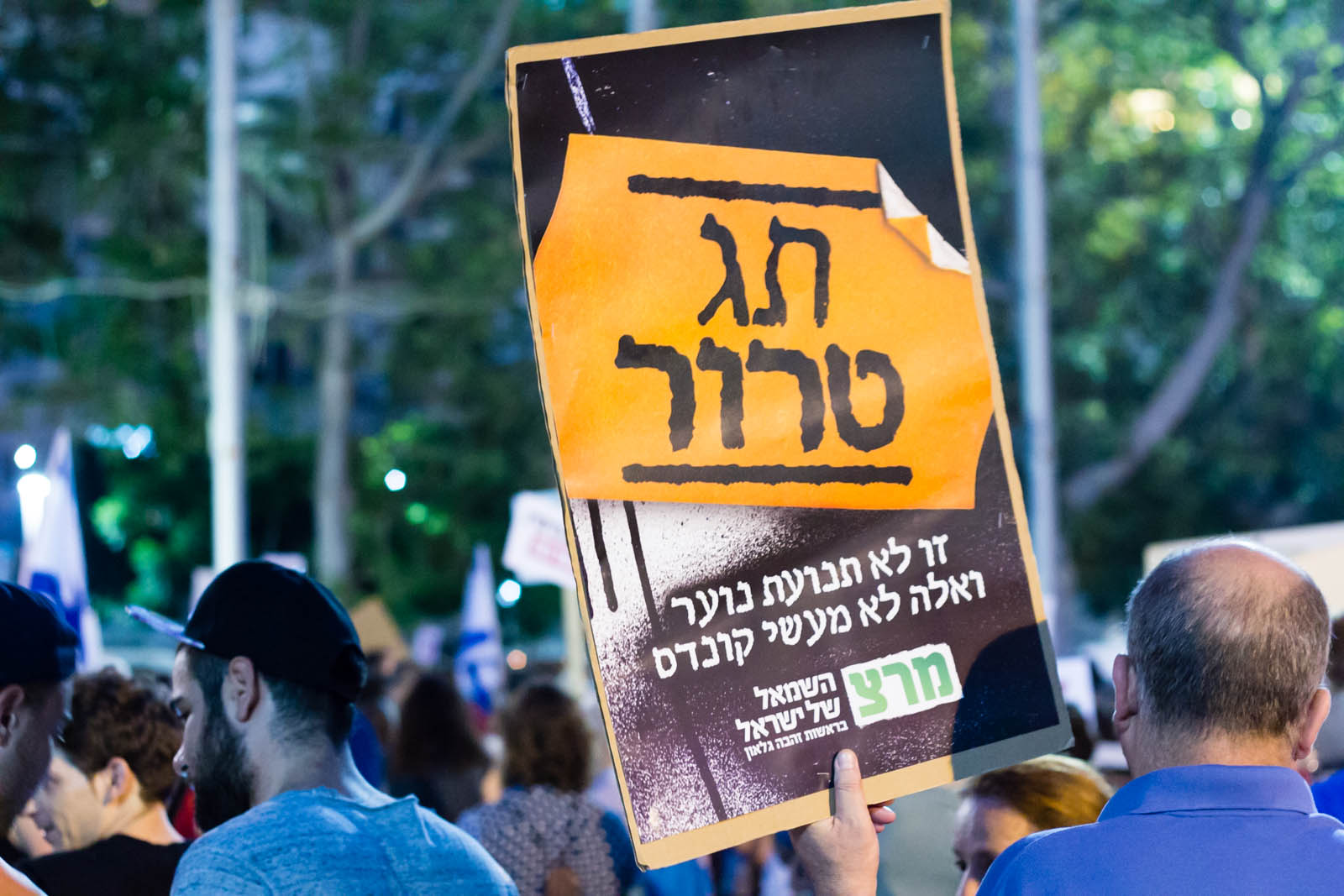
A Meretz sign at a demonstration against Price Tags attacks at Rabin Square on 1 August 2015. "Terror Tag: this is not a youth movement, and these are not pranks"

- 14 January: 11 vehicles in the Palestinian neighborhood of Beit Safafa, East Jerusalem, had their tires punctured and the cars sprayed with hate graffiti, one referring to a "demarcation order", alluding to an order to demolish an illegal settler outpost. Hilltop youth are suspected.
- 26 February: An arson attack on a Greek Orthodox seminary for the study of Christianity next to Jaffa Gate in Jerusalem destroyed the bathroom. The walls were smeared with graffiti, including "Jesus is a son of a bitch", and "the Redemption of Zion". The action was defined as a price tag attack by the Arab Joint List party.
- 5 March: Two cars were torched, and price-tag graffiti in Hebrew ("Death to Arabs" and "Glory to the Jews") were sprayed on walls, in the village of Mughayyir. Locals suspect that Adei Ad settlers are responsible.
- 18 June: In a suspected price tag attack by extremists, arsonists burnt down part of the Benedictine Church of the Multiplication at Tabgha, on the Sea of Galilee. The walls were daubed with the words "The false gods will be eliminated", a citation from a Jewish prayer. 16 Israeli youths, 10 from the settlement of Yitzhar were briefly detained for interrogation and then released. On July 12, police arrested several Israeli youths on suspicion of being behind the arson attack.
- 31 July: 18-month-old Ali Saad Dawabsha was killed, two houses burnt down and three family members, including a 4-year-old child, hospitalized with severe burns after a suspected arson attack by Jewish extremists in Duma, near Nablus. Graffiti was left on the walls saying "Long live Messiah the king", "Price Tag" and "Revenge". The father, 32-year-old Saad Dawabsha and the mother, 26-year-old Rahem, later died of their injuries on 8 August and 6 September respectively. The attack is suspected to be in reaction to the Israeli government demolishing illegally built houses in Beit El.
- 13 August: A Bedouin tent, used as a storage place for animal feed, was torched by two youths, one, Avi Gavny, identified the following month as belonging to the Hilltop youth. A graffiti in Hebrew reading "Administrators of Revenge" was found on the site.
- 1–2 October: A number of price tag attacks on Palestinian property and persons occurred overnight after the drive by killing of an Israeli couple in the West Bank.

== 2017 ==
- 9 May: Nearly 30 vehicles were vandalized by Jewish extremists between the Palestinian neighbourhood of Shuafat and the Israeli settlement of Ramat Shlomo in East Jerusalem. Some of the car tires were slashed and others spray painted with graffiti reading “administrative price tag” or “Pikar the King”, referencing Elkana Pikar, an Israeli settler who served in an administrative restraining order for four months.

== 2018 ==
- 17 January: Israeli settlers from Ramot vandalized vehicles by damaging tires and spraying racist grafitti in village of Beit Iksa.
- 13 April: Israeli settlers burned a mosque in Aqraba, Nablus and vandalized the mosque with the words "death" and "price tag" spray paintef on the walls.
- 16 May: Right-wing Jewish extremists destroyed 400 grapevine trees in Beit Anun owned by residents from nearby Hebron.
- 23 November: Vehicle tyres slashed and graffitied on in Beit Iksa.
- 23 November: Vehicle tyres slashed, the local school and vehicles graffitied on in Asira al-Qibliya.
- 25 November: Vehicles in Al-Mughayyir were vandalised and graffiti left on houses.
- 11 December: Graffiti sprayed on 26 vehicles in Beitin.

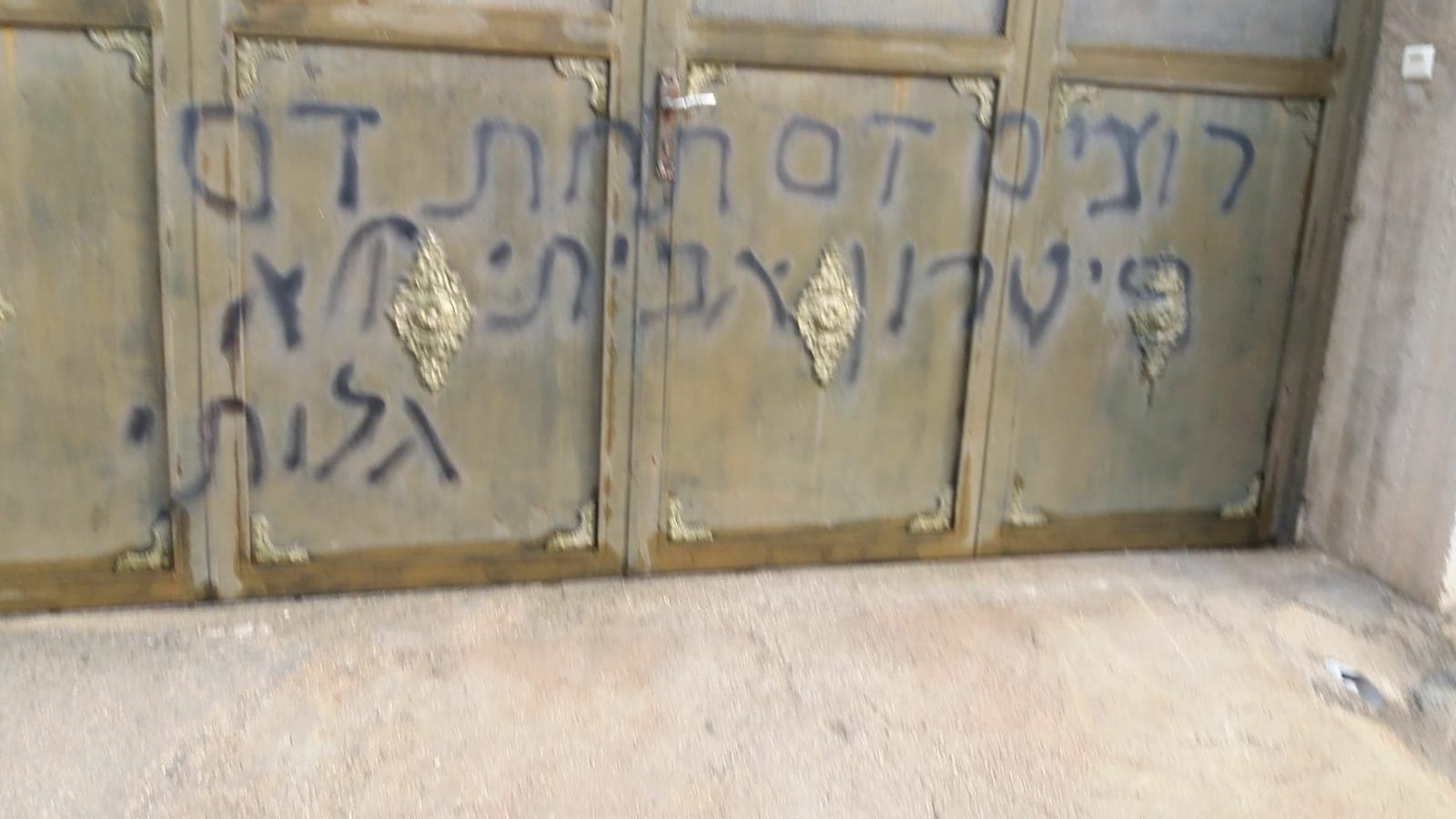
Price tag attack graffiti in Yasuf, December 2018

- 18 December. Vehicles, houses and the local mosque sprayed with graffiti in Yasuf.

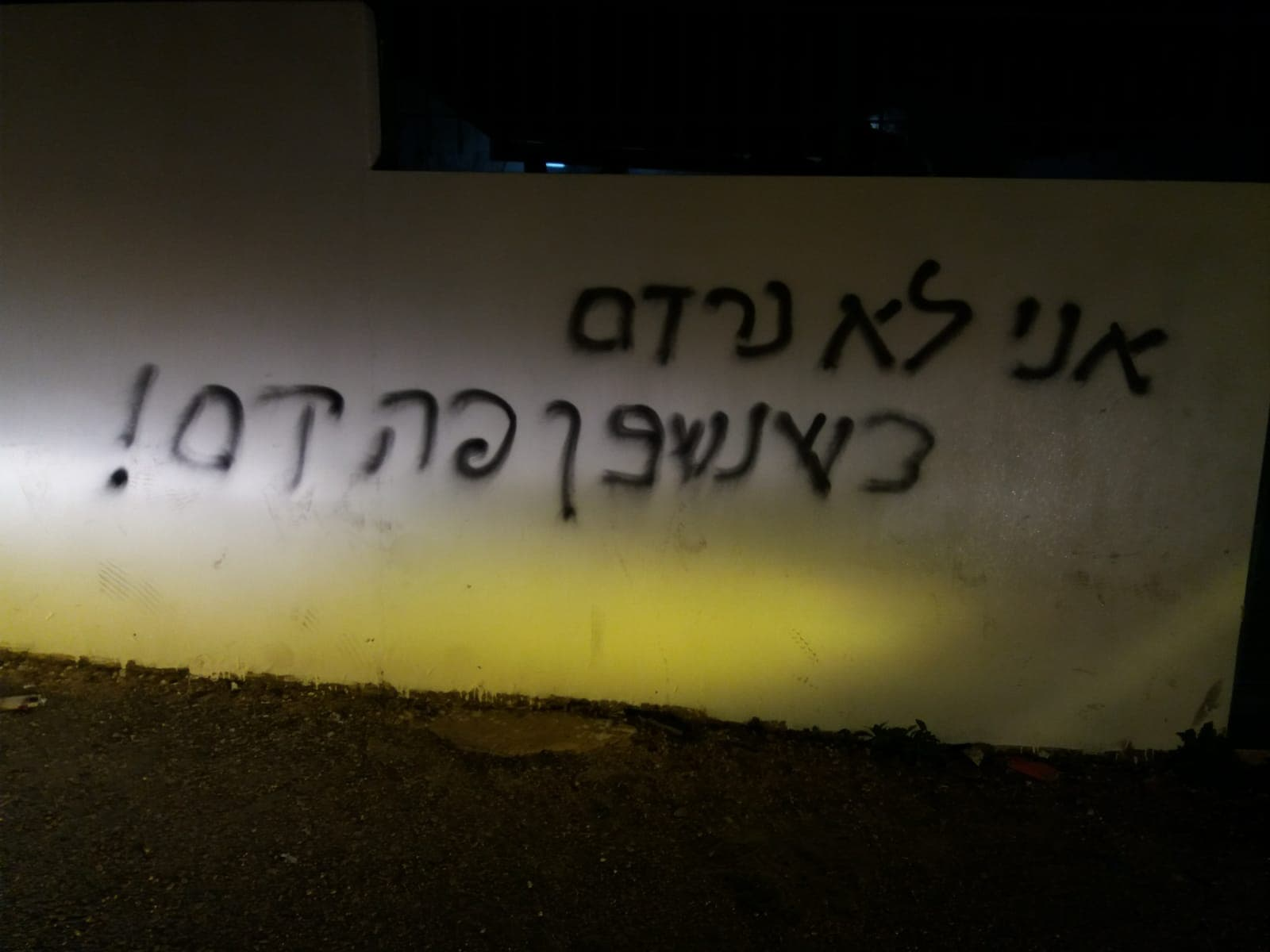
Price tag attack graffiti in Yasuf, December 2018

- 20 December: Graffiti painted on houses and cars vandalised in Beit Hanina.
- 23 December: 110 olive saplings belonging to a Palestinian farmer from Khirbet Susiya were uprooted.

== 2019 ==
- 22 January: Israeli settlers from Bat Ayin destroyed and cut down hundreds of olive trees in Wad Abu al-Rish, north of Beit Ummar.
- 12 December: Vandals punctured twenty cars and sprayed anti-Arab and Islamophobic messages on the walls in Manshiya Zabda, an Arab village in northern Israel.

== 2020 ==
- 25 January: A mosque in Sharafat neighborhood in East Jerusalem was torched by vandals who spray-painted in Hebrew “Destroy [the property of] Jews? Kumi Ori destroys [the property of] enemies!” before fleeing.
- 28 January: A classroom was torched in a price-tag attack in the Palestinian village of Einabus in the West Bank. The graffiti found in the place indicated that the attack was retribution for the Israeli army having demolished two illegally-built homes in the Jewish outpost of Kumi Ori.
- 26 February: Vandals damaged 14 cars and sprayed graffiti on the walls in Yasuf, Salfit Governorate. One of the messages sprayed on the walls read, "there will be a war over Judea and Samaria."
- 27 July: A mosque in Al Bireh in the West Bank was torched and vandalized in a price tag by Israeli settlers. Anti-Palestinian slogans were spray-painted on the walls of the mosque.

== 2021 ==
- 17 September: A 42-year-old Palestinian bus driver from Silwan, East Jerusalem was stabbed by three Israelis in West Jerusalem, leaving him moderately injured.

== 2022 ==
- 9 March: Nearly 30 vehicles were vandalized by Israeli settlers in the Arab village of Jaljulia. One of the message sprayed on one of the vehicles read: "Arab watch out, my sister is off-limits".
- 25 November: Several vehicles in the Arab Israeli towns of Abu Ghosh and Ein Naqquba were vandalised and sprayed racist graffiti by Israeli settlers.

== 2023 ==
- 14 February: Several Israeli settlers vandalized two cars belonging to Palestinians in Hebron.
- 21 June: 200 Israeli settlers and Hilltop Youth members set Palestinian cars, wheat fields, and homes on fire in Turmus Ayya, killing one Palestinian and injuring twelve others. According to the IDF, the attack was a suspected retaliation for the death of Nahman Shmuel, an Israeli settler from Eli, who was killed in an attack on 19 June.
- 17 July: Four vehicles were set on fire by Israeli extremists, with anti-Palestinian graffiti sprayed on a wall in Abu Ghosh, an Israeli Arab village west of Jerusalem.

== 2025 ==
- 4 August: A two-story building on a Palestinian farm was torched by Israeli settlers in Turmus Ayya, with spray-painting the words "Revenge" and "Price Tag" on the walls.

== 2026 ==
- 23 February: A mosque in Tell, Nablus was set on fire and vandalized by Israeli settlers, spray-painted with offensive phrases of the prophet Muhammad as well as the words, "revenge" and "price tag".

== See also ==
- Israeli–Palestinian conflict
- Israeli settler violence
- List of violent incidents in the Israeli–Palestinian conflict, 2019
- List of violent incidents in the Israeli–Palestinian conflict, 2020
- Timeline of the Israeli–Palestinian conflict, 2014
- Timeline of the Israeli–Palestinian conflict, 2015
- Zionist political violence
