= Tapuah Junction stabbing =

Tapuah Junction stabbing may refer to:

- 2010 Tapuah Junction stabbing
- 2013 Tapuah Junction stabbing
