= Orif =

- O.R.I.F., see Internal fixation
- Urif, a Palestinian village on the West Bank
