= Urif =

’Urif
- Municipality type D (Village council)

Arabic transcription(s)
  - Arabic: عوريف
  - Latin: Orif (unofficial)
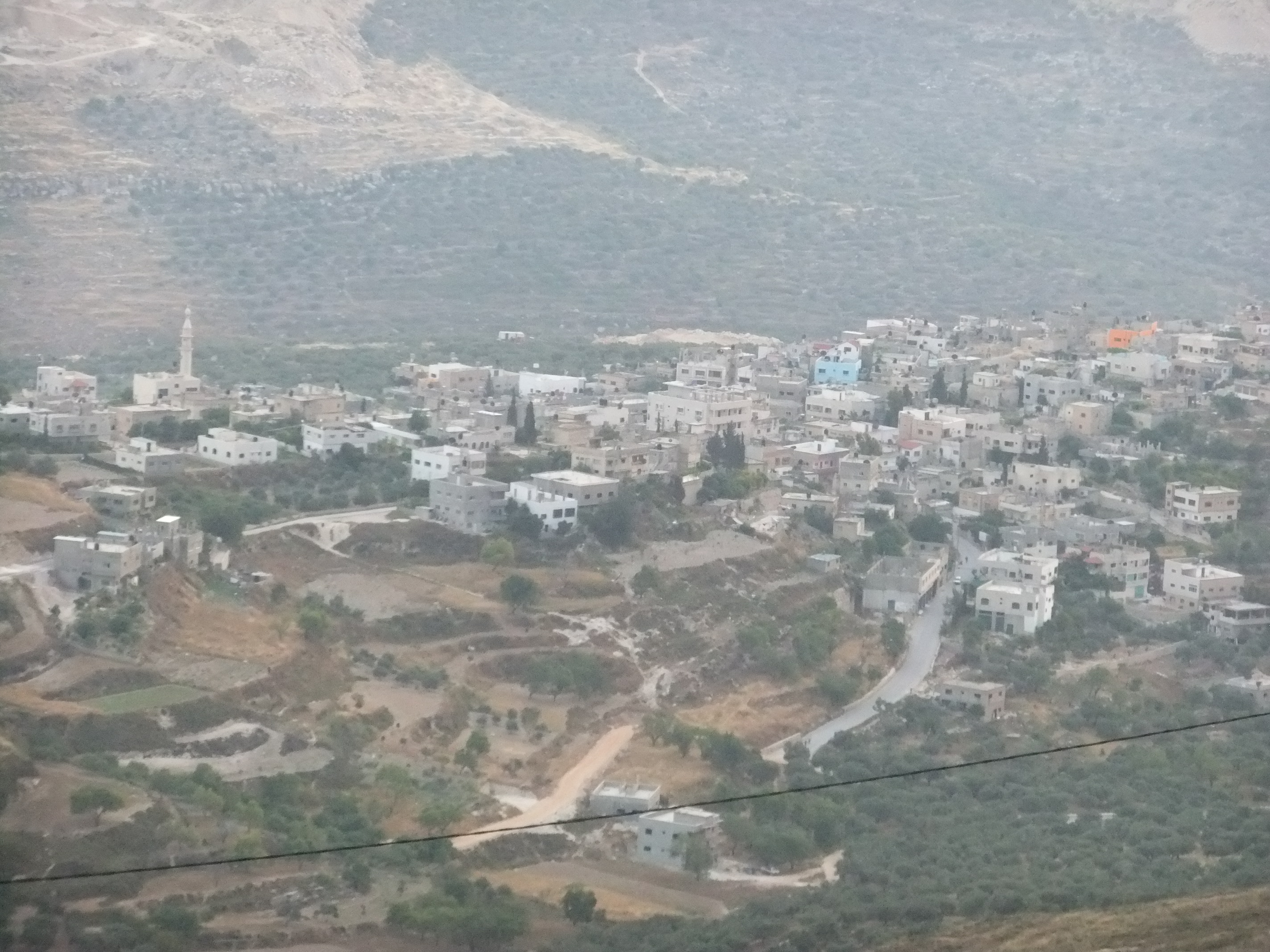

- Location of ’Urif within Palestine
- Coordinates: 32°09′34″N 35°13′23″E
- Palestine grid: 171/174
- State: State of Palestine
- Governorate: Nablus

Government
  - Type: Village council

Population (2017)
  - Total: 3,624
- Name meaning: from personal name

Urif (Arabic: عوريف) is a Palestinian village in the Nablus Governorate of the State of Palestine, in the northern West Bank, located 13 kilometers (8 miles) south of Nablus. According to the Palestinian Central Bureau of Statistics (PCBS), the town had a population of 3,624 inhabitants in 2017.

== Location ==
‘Urif is located 7.6km south of Nablus. It is bordered by ‘Einabus to the east, ‘Asira al Qibliya to the north, and Jamma’in to the west and south.

== History ==
Ceramics from the late Roman have been found here. Dauphin writes that ceramics from the Byzantine era also have been found, but Ellenblum writes that no pottery from that era has been found here.

=== Crusader period ===
A woman of Dayr Urif, Sa'ida, was wed to Ahmad ibn Khalid ibn Qudama, a jurist and leader of Hanbali villagers in the Nablus area who fled from Crusader rule to Damascus between 1156 and 1173. Ahmad's grandson Diya al-Din (1173–1245) refers to the presence of Muslims in Urif during his lifetime.

The medieval town of Gerraa, today the ruin of Khirbet Jarra'a, was located to the west.

=== Ottoman era ===
Urif was incorporated into the Ottoman Empire in 1517 with all of Palestine, and in 1596 it appeared in the tax registers as being in the nahiya (subdistrict) of Jabal Qubal of the liwa (district) of Nablus. It was noted as hali, empty, but a fixed tax rate of 33.3% was paid on various agricultural products, such as wheat, barley, summer crops, olive trees, goats and/or beehives, in addition to "occasional revenues"; a total of 2,800 akçe.

In 1838 Urif was noted as a Muslim village, part of the Jurat Merda subdistrict, located south of Nablus. In 1870, Victor Guérin found the village to occupy the top of a hill, and having about 450 inhabitants. In 1882, the PEF's Survey of Western Palestine (SWP) described Urif as: "A stone village, on high ground, with a few olives; supplied by wells and with a small spring to the east."

=== British Mandate era ===
In the 1922 census of Palestine conducted by the British Mandate authorities, Urif had a population of 270 Muslims, increasing in the 1931 census to 403; 402 Muslims and 1 Christian, in 103 houses.

In the 1945 statistics the population was 520, all Muslims, while the total land area was 3,965 dunams, according to an official land and population survey. Of this, 1,107 dunams were for plantations and irrigable land, 1,452 for cereals, while 32 dunams were classified as built-up areas.

=== Jordanian period ===
In the wake of the 1948 Arab–Israeli War, and after the 1949 Armistice Agreements, Urif came under Jordanian rule. The Jordanian census of 1961 found 710 inhabitants.

=== Post 1967 ===
Since the Six-Day War in 1967, Urif has been under Israeli occupation. As of 2014, 3,115 dunams (77%) of Urif land were Area B, while 949 (23%) were Area C. 58 dunums of Urif's land have been confiscated for the Israeli settlement of Yitzhar.

=== Chronology of events and disturbances ===
- On May 19, 2012, about 25 Jewish settlers, some of them carrying guns, set fire to the wheat fields of Urif, and shot one Palestinian man in the stomach.
- On May 26, 2012, settlers from Yitzhar shot a youth from Urif. They then tied him up and proceeded to beat him. Samaria Regional Council head Gershon Mesika said that the shooting was a defensive act against a man who wielded a knife. The clash had started when a group of settlers were thought to have set fire to fields belonging to Urif, although the settlers denied any involvement.
- In 2013, settlers from Yitzhar reportedly smashed the window of a mosque in Urif and tried to burn it down.
- In February, 2015, settlers from Yitzhar defaced the village school with graffiti, with 'Death to Arabs' sprayed alongside the Star of David in an alleged price tag attacks.
- In July 2016, the IDF confiscated in Urif homemade weapons and ammunition, and lathes used to manufacture weapons, as well as apprehending four local Arab residents of Urif who sold such weapons.
- In 2017, farmers from Urif were prevented from working on their land in Area B.
- In May, 2021, as part of the 2021 demonstrations; Nidal Sael Safadi was killed in Urif by the Israeli army, while "trying to confront Israeli settlers who were storming the area".
- In June 2023, it was the target – along with nearby Turmus Ayya and several other Palestinian villages – of Israeli settler terror attacks. After the attack, the Israel Defense Forces (IDF) spokesperson called the incursions and attacks by armed Jewish settlers "acts of terror conducted by criminals", adding that the IDF had “failed to prevent” the attacks, described as “very grave”, and that such incidents "create terror" by pushing the attacked civilian populations "towards extremism".
- On 5 September 2025, a 57-year-old man from Urif named Ahmed Shehadeh, was killed by Israeli forces near military checkpoints in Nablus.
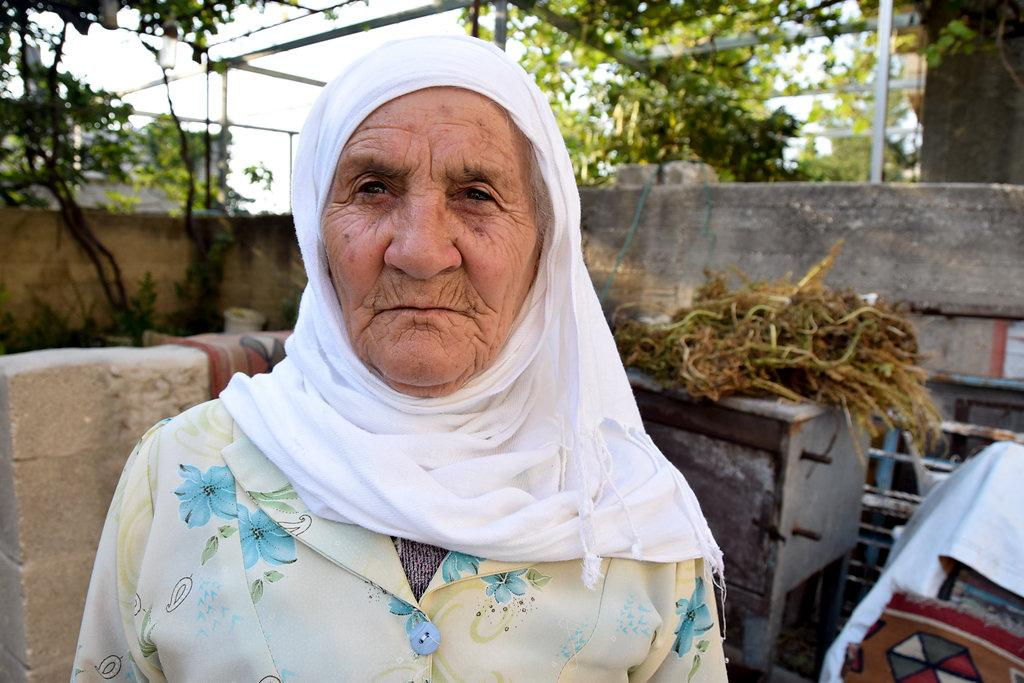
81 year old Jamileh Shehadeh, Urif, who had all her olive trees cut down by Israeli settlers

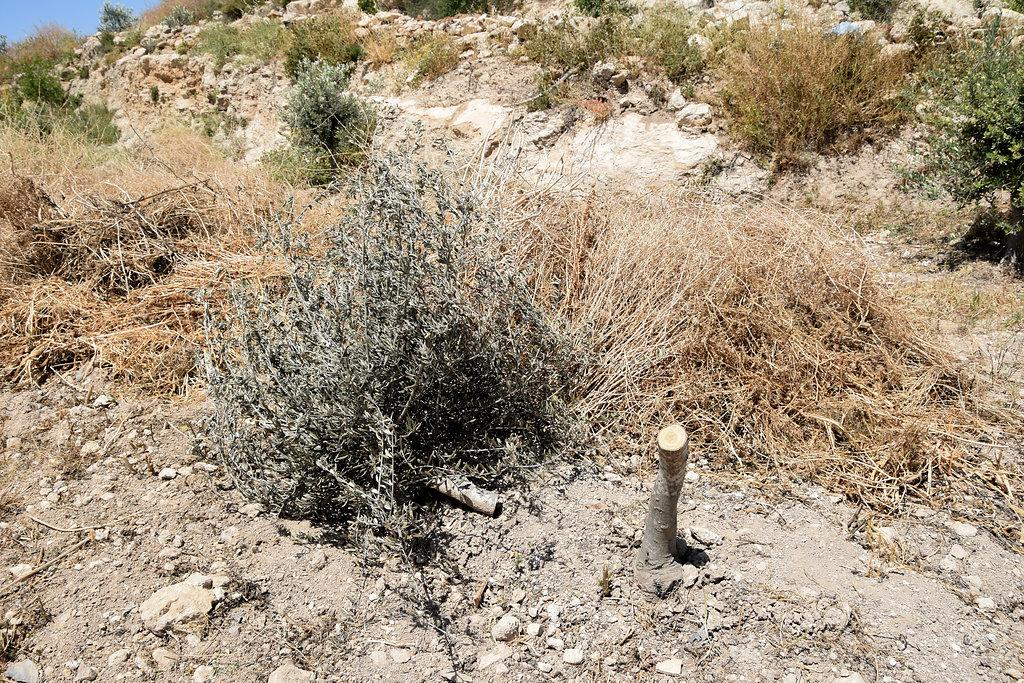
Olive tree vandalized by settlers

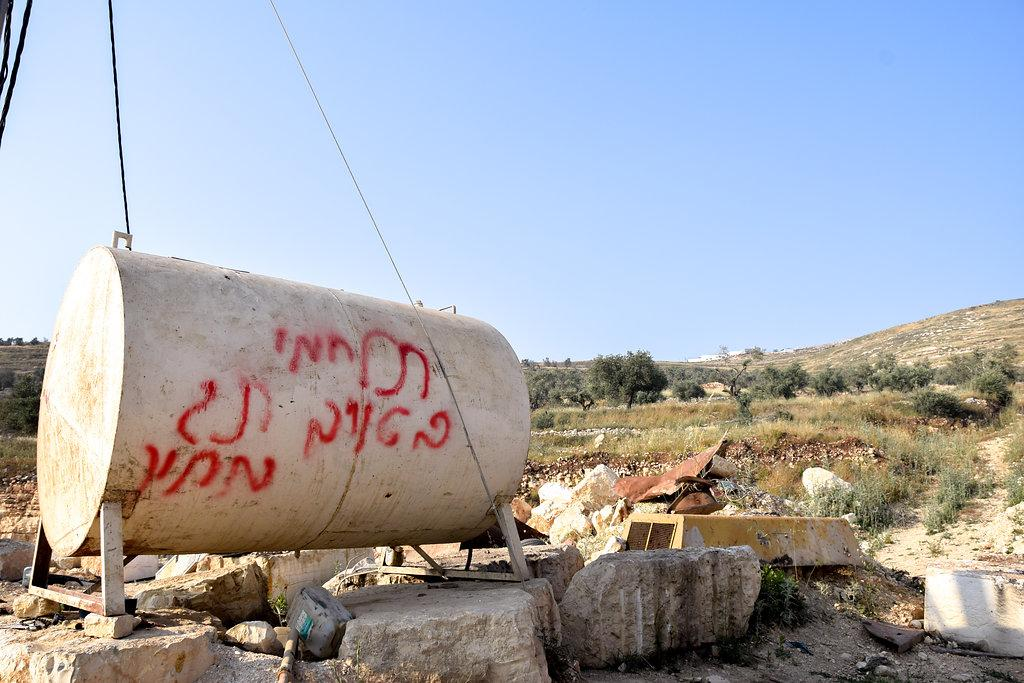
"Fight the enemy. Price Tag." Hebrew Graffiti spray-painted by Israeli settlers

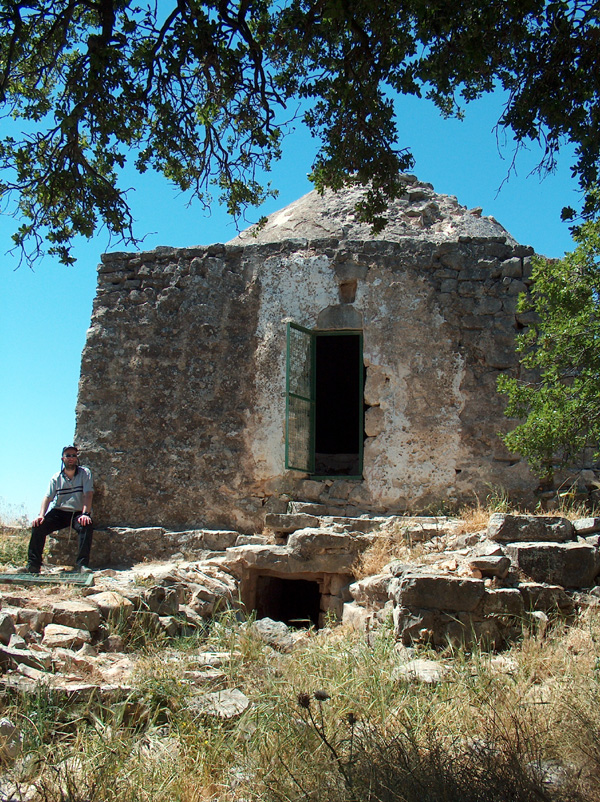
Maqam (shrine) of Salman the Persian northeast of Urif

== Bibliography ==
- Barron, J.B., ed. (1923). Palestine: Report and General Abstracts of the Census of 1922. Government of Palestine.
- Conder, C.R.; Kitchener, H.H. (1882). The Survey of Western Palestine: Memoirs of the Topography, Orography, Hydrography, and Archaeology. Vol. 2. London: Committee of the Palestine Exploration Fund.
- Dauphin, C. (1998). La Palestine byzantine, Peuplement et Populations. BAR International Series 726 (in French). Vol. III : Catalogue. Oxford: Archeopress. ISBN 0-860549-05-4.
- Ellenblum, R. (2003). Frankish Rural Settlement in the Latin Kingdom of Jerusalem. Cambridge University Press. ISBN 9780521521871.
- Government of Jordan, Department of Statistics (1964). First Census of Population and Housing. Volume I: Final Tables; General Characteristics of the Population (PDF).
- Government of Palestine, Department of Statistics (1945). Village Statistics, April, 1945.
- Guérin, V. (1875). Description Géographique Historique et Archéologique de la Palestine (in French). Vol. 2: Samarie, pt. 2. Paris: L'Imprimerie Nationale.
- Hadawi, S. (1970). Village Statistics of 1945: A Classification of Land and Area ownership in Palestine. Palestine Liberation Organization Research Center.
- Hütteroth, W.-D.; Abdulfattah, K. (1977). Historical Geography of Palestine, Transjordan and Southern Syria in the Late 16th Century. Erlanger Geographische Arbeiten, Sonderband 5. Erlangen, Germany: Vorstand der Fränkischen Geographischen Gesellschaft. ISBN 3-920405-41-2.
- Mills, E., ed. (1932). Census of Palestine 1931. Population of Villages, Towns and Administrative Areas. Jerusalem: Government of Palestine.
- Palmer, E.H. (1881). The Survey of Western Palestine: Arabic and English Name Lists Collected During the Survey by Lieutenants Conder and Kitchener, R. E. Transliterated and Explained by E.H. Palmer. Committee of the Palestine Exploration Fund.
- Robinson, E.; Smith, E. (1841). Biblical Researches in Palestine, Mount Sinai and Arabia Petraea: A Journal of Travels in the year 1838. Vol. 3. Boston: Crocker & Brewster.
