= Timeline of the Israeli–Palestinian conflict in 2019 =

The following is a timeline of events during the Israeli–Palestinian conflict in 2019. A total of 137 Palestinians were killed, 135 by Israeli forces and two by Israeli settlers. 28 children were killed, 26 boys and two girls. 33 civilians were killed as part of the Great March of Return demonstrations. Ten Israelis were killed by Palestinians and at least 120 were injured.

341 attacks were carried out by Israeli settlers against Palestinians, in which two Palestinians were killed and 115 injured. Palestinian land and property were vandalized, including almost 8,000 trees. The Nablus Governorate was most affected by settler violence, followed by Hebron Governorate and Ramallah Governorate. In the West Bank, Israeli forces demolished 623 structures, of which 98 were EU funded humanitarian aid structures (valued at EUR 480,625), a doubling in the demolition of EU funded structures compared to 2018. Overall, 2019 saw a 35% increase in demolitions and a 95% increase in displacements, compared to 2018.

== February ==
=== 7 February ===
19-year-old Israeli teen Ori Ansbacher from Tekoa was raped and murdered by a Palestinian man, Arafat Irfaiya, while walking in the Ein Yael forest southwest of Jerusalem.

== March ==
=== 6 March ===
A group of settlers escorted by Israeli soldiers stormed the Nabi Yunis Mosque in Halhul north of Hebron. Soldiers fired rubber bullets at unarmed Palestinian protestors, injuring two.

=== 17 March ===
19-year-old Sgt. Gal Kaiden from Beersheba was stabbed and killed in an attack at the Ariel Junction. After stabbing him, the Palestinian assailant stole his weapon and shot him and two other people in separate locations.

Rabbi Achiad Ettinger, 47, a father of 12 from Eli, was critically wounded while driving past the scene of the attack. He succumbed to his wounds the following day.

=== 20 March ===
Ahmad Jamal Manasra, 23 or 26, (Note: Age reported as either 23 or 26 by sources.) from Wadi Fukin was shot and killed by an Israeli soldier at the al-Nashash checkpoint at the southern entrance to the al-Khader village near Bethlehem while trying to provide aid to a Palestinian family.

At around 9:00 pm the Ghayatha (Note: Also transliterated Ghayada and Ghayadah) family were making their way home to Nahhalin after having visited relatives in Artas. Traveling in the car were 'Alaa, 38, his wife, Maysaa, 34, and their two daughters aged 5 and 8. A dispute developed between 'Alaa and another driver on the road. About 50 meters from the al-Nashash checkpoint he got out of his car to confront the driver. The driver, however, did not stop and kept going but 'Alaa was shot in the stomach by a soldier stationed at a nearby watchtower.

Another car driven by Ahmad Manasra, carrying three other young men, approached the checkpoint at about the same time. They saw Maysaa calling for help and got out of the car to help her. Three of them helped 'Alaa into their own car and took him to a hospital but Manasra stayed behind to comfort Maysaa and her daughters. As he went out of Maysaa's car, he was shot in both hands and in the chest by the same soldier that had shot 'Alaa. He later died of his wounds.

The Israeli military issued a statement saying that stones had been thrown at Israeli cars and the soldier in response shot Ghayatha and Manasra. The Israeli military police conducted an investigation of the incident. In August 2020, it was reported that the Military Advocate General would seek three months of community service for the soldier that killed Manasra as part of a plea bargain.

== May ==
=== 17 May ===
Israeli paramilitary settlers attacked Palestinian villagers and torched their farms in Burin and Asira al-Qibliya. Soldiers nearby did not arrest the attackers and prevented the Palestinians from approaching their burning land. Israeli security services verified that one of the arsonists was an off-duty soldier.

=== 21 May ===
Israeli forces entered Al-Aqsa Mosque Compound and drove out Palestinian worshippers performing Iʿtikāf inside the courtyard, at gunpoint.

=== 31 May ===
Two Palestinians, including a 16-year-old boy, were shot and killed by Israeli forces in two separate incidents in and around Jerusalem. The Palestinian boy was shot near An Nu'man checkpoint (Bethlehem) when Israeli forces opened fire at a group of Palestinians, who were attempting to cross the Barrier without permits to enter Jerusalem. Earlier that day, a 19-year-old Palestinian man from Abwein stabbed and injured two Israelis, including a 16-year-old boy, in two different locations in the Old City of Jerusalem, and was subsequently shot and killed by Israeli police.

== June ==
=== 2 June ===
Hundreds of ultra-nationalist Israelis entered Al-Aqsa Mosque Compound accompanied by riot police, in defiance of a prior agreement that the site would only be open to Muslims during the final days of Ramadan.

=== 27 June ===
20-year-old Mohammed Obeid was shot and killed by Israeli soldiers in Issawiya, East Jerusalem. Israeli officials confirmed that they killed Obeid but asserted that he had threatened their lives by setting off fireworks. Witnesses reported that the soldier's lives were not in danger. Israeli authorities initially refused to return the body, triggering protests in Issawiya during which at least 80 Palestinians were injured. Obeid's funeral, held on July 1st and attended by over 1,000 mourners, was followed by further conflict between protesters and police.

== July ==
=== 16 July ===
Tariq Zebania, 7, from Tarqumiyah northwest of Hebron was struck and killed by a car driven by an Israeli settler as he rode his bike by the settlement road outside the settlement Adhoura.

== August ==
=== 23 August ===
17-year-old Rina Shnerb from Lod was murdered while hiking with her family in nature when Palestinian militants detonated an IED device. Her father and brother were seriously wounded.

== October ==
=== 11 October ===
- 49 demonstrators were injured during clashes between hundreds of Palestinian demonstrators and Israeli soldiers in the eastern Gaza Strip close to the border with Israel. 14 of them were children according to the health ministry in Gaza.

== November ==
=== 8 November ===
- Thousands of Palestinians protested on the Gaza border and 69 were wounded by Israeli soldiers according to the Gaza health ministry, 29 by live fire. An armored vehicle was hit by a Molotov cocktail.

=== 10 November ===
- A 14-year-old Palestinian boy was hit with a tear-gas canister during a Great March of Return demonstration in Gaza. He died of his wounds on 31 January 2020.

=== 22 November ===
Israeli settlers raided several villages near Nablus and burnt tens of Palestinian-owned cars.
