= Evyatar =

Israeli settlement in the West Bank

Evyatar אביתר
- Israeli settlement
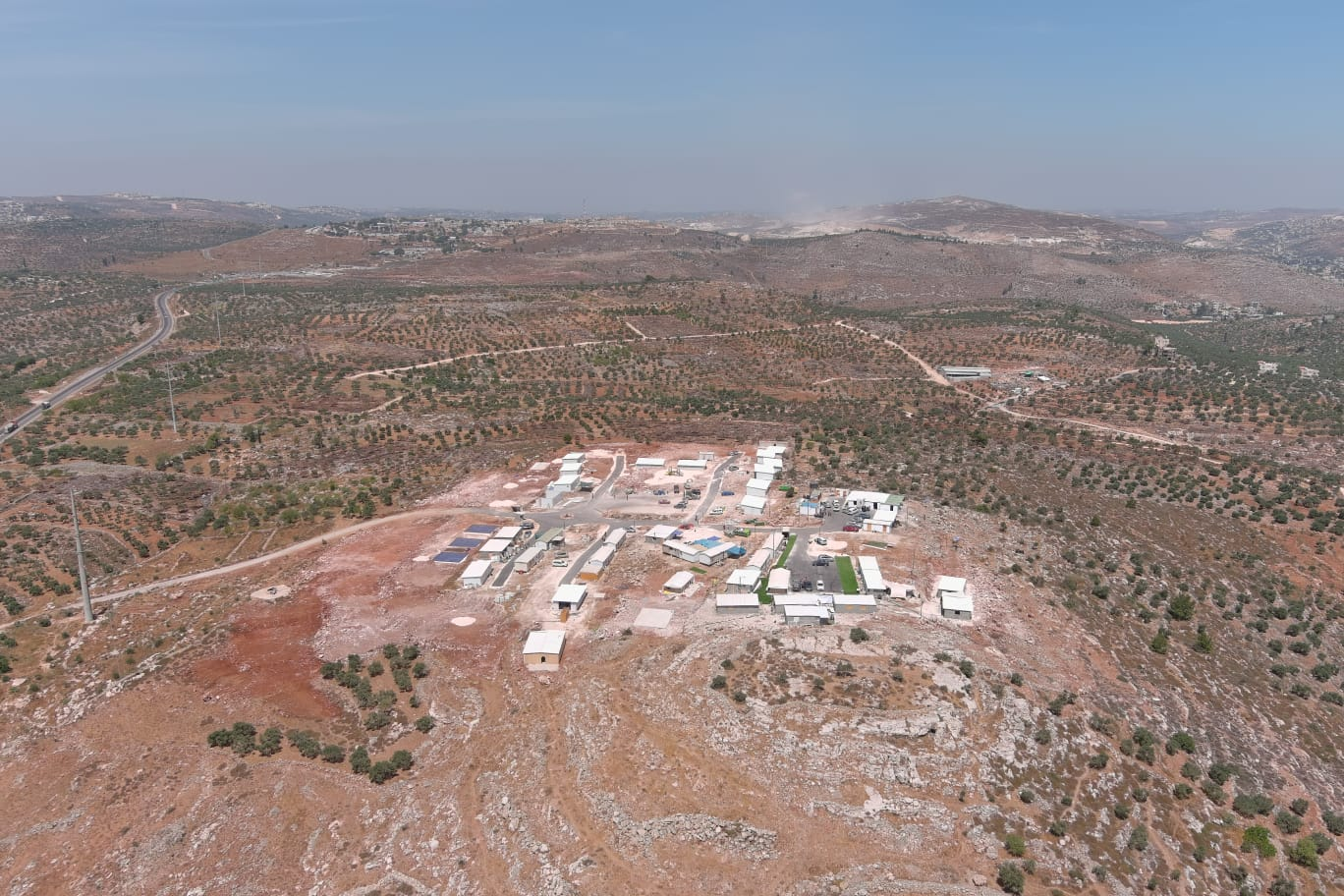
- Aerial photograph of Evyatar in June 2021
- Interactive map of Evyatar
- Coordinates: 32°07′10.9″N 35°16′30.4″E
- Region: West Bank
- District: Judea and Samaria Area
- Regional council: Shomron
- Founded: 2013, legalized 2024

Evyatar (Hebrew: אביתר, romanized: Evyatar or Eviatar) is an Israeli settlement in the West Bank, located east of Tapuach Junction, in lands of the Palestinian town of Beita, south of Nablus. The settlement was first built in May 2013, and was named after Israeli settler Evyatar Borovsky who was murdered in a Palestinian attack at Tapuach (or Zaatra) Junction on 30 April 2013.

Evyatar was founded by the Nachala Movement, which promotes similar settlements across the West Bank. The outpost has been destroyed several times by Israeli officials soon after its establishment in 2013, and again in 2016 and 2018. The current incarnation, established in May 2021, includes "about 50 permanent structures, a playground, a synagogue, a religious study hall, a grocery store, a power grid and fully-paved roads," according to a B'Tselem description. The settlement was evacuated but not destroyed in June 2021. It was the site of major settler protests in February and April 2023, and fully reoccupied in June 2023. It has been described as "the most famous outpost established in recent years."

The building of the outpost, and the subsequent legal process intended to make it permanent, sparked regular Palestinian protests; as of May 2022, 8 Palestinians have been killed by Israeli soldiers during the protests.

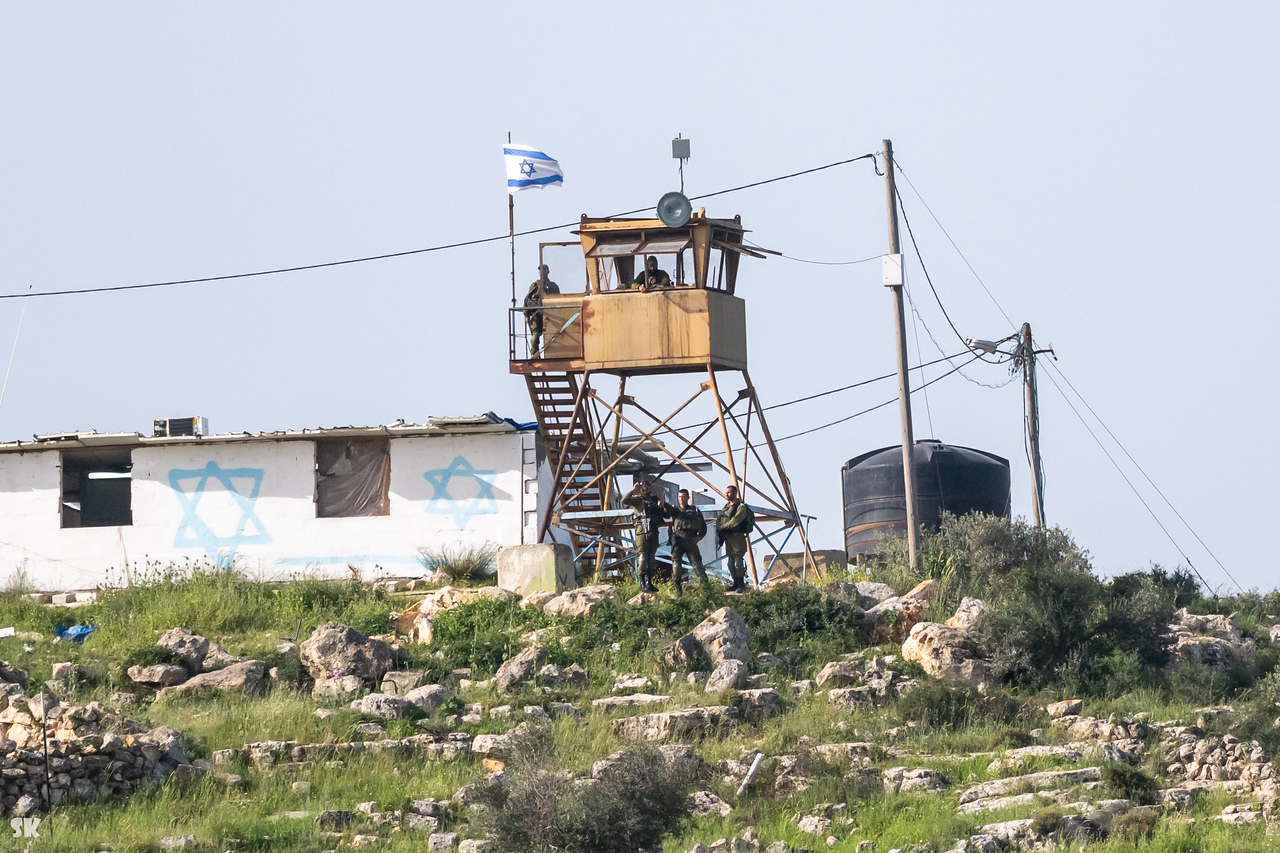
Evyatar outpost, April 2023

According to Nathaniel Berman, Evyatar is "emblematic of the process whereby settlers are able to seize land with the express purpose of disrupting Palestinian life and are able to secure state ratification of their actions. This is a regime which lends fodder to some of the worst charges laid against Israel in recent years, including apartheid." According to Yossi Dagan, head of the Shomron Regional Council, "The government has committed to the Avitar plan. The correct Zionist answer to the terrible attacks is construction, construction, construction. The eyes of the people of Israel are on settlement."

On 27 June 2024, the Israeli cabinet authorized the settlement and four others. In July 2024, the Israeli government declared some but not all of the land beneath Evyatar as state land, in a move to legalize the settlement under Israeli law.

The international community considers Israeli settlements in the West Bank illegal under international law, but the Israeli government disputes this.

== History ==
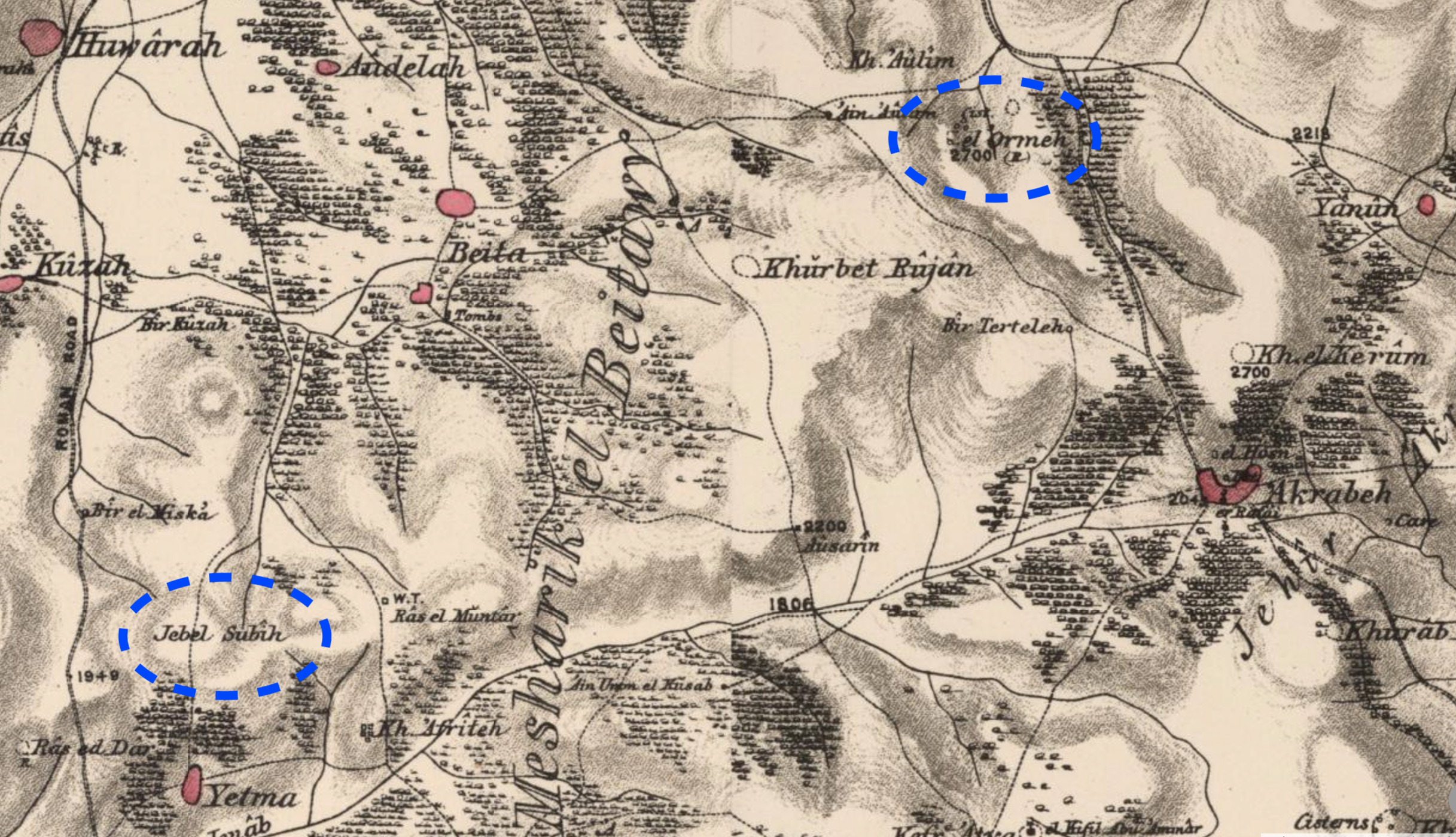
Jabal Sabih (lower left) as shown in an 1880 Survey of Palestine map

Mount Sabih or Jabal Sabih is planted with olive trees used agriculturally by residents of nearby Palestinian villages of Beita, Yatma, and Qabalan. The land was historically owned by Palestinians, and agricultural cultivation on the site continued into the 1980s, according to land rights researcher Dror Etkes. From the 1980s to the late 1990s, the Israeli military operated a base at the site.

The Israeli government administers land in the occupied West Bank, and retained full security and civil control of land in Area C as established under the Oslo Peace Process, including the area where Evyatar is located.

The Israeli outpost at Evyatar was established in 2013 as a reaction to the 2013 Tapuah Junction stabbing in which Evyatar Borovsky was killed. The Evyatar Facebook page states the settlers' desire to "disrupt contiguity between Qabalan, Yatma, and Beita." The outpost has been destroyed several times by Israeli officials. It was built again rapidly in a few days in May 2021 after the killing of Yehuda Guetta. Israeli soldiers helped to build the outpost, although they were not authorized to do so. In June 2021, shortly after the election of Naftali Bennett as Prime Minister, the Israeli government ordered settlers to leave, but agreed to leave the buildings standing while the Israeli state determined the status of the land.

After a compromise with the Israeli authorities stipulating that the outpost's structures are to remain intact and the settlers may return if the land is subsequently deemed state-owned, the residents vacated the settlement on 2 July. On 8 July 2021, Palestinians from nearby villages petitioned Israel's High Court of Justice to revoke this compromise on the grounds that they hold the rights to the land.

=== Protests ===
The building of the outpost, and the subsequent legal process intended to make it permanent, sparked regular Palestinian protests; as of May 2022, 8 Palestinians have been killed by Israeli soldiers during the protests.

On 9 July 2021, Israeli forces fired on hundreds of Palestinian demonstrators protesting land confiscation at nearby Beita. The Palestine Red Crescent said 379 protesters were wounded, 31 by live ammunition. On 14 August 2021, Palestinian rioters demonstrated putting up a swastika inside a burning star of David.

On 27 February 2023, the day after a rampage by Israeli Settlers in the Palestinian village of Huwara, Minister of National Security Itamar Ben-Gvir organized a gathering in the outpost as it was being evicted, saying that people should not take the law into their own hands while also vowing to crush the enemy, during the gathering he also announced that he was discussing the matter of legalizing the outpost with Prime Minister Benjamin Netanyahu.

On 10 April 2023, a group of at least a thousand activists marched towards the outpost demanding it to be legalized under Israeli law, among the people in the group there were also several government ministers including Itamar Ben-Gvir and Bezalel Smotrich. The group also included members of the Knesset like Simcha Rothman and Boaz Bismuth as well as senior Religious Zionist rabbis. The march was secured by IDF soldiers as well as police officers.

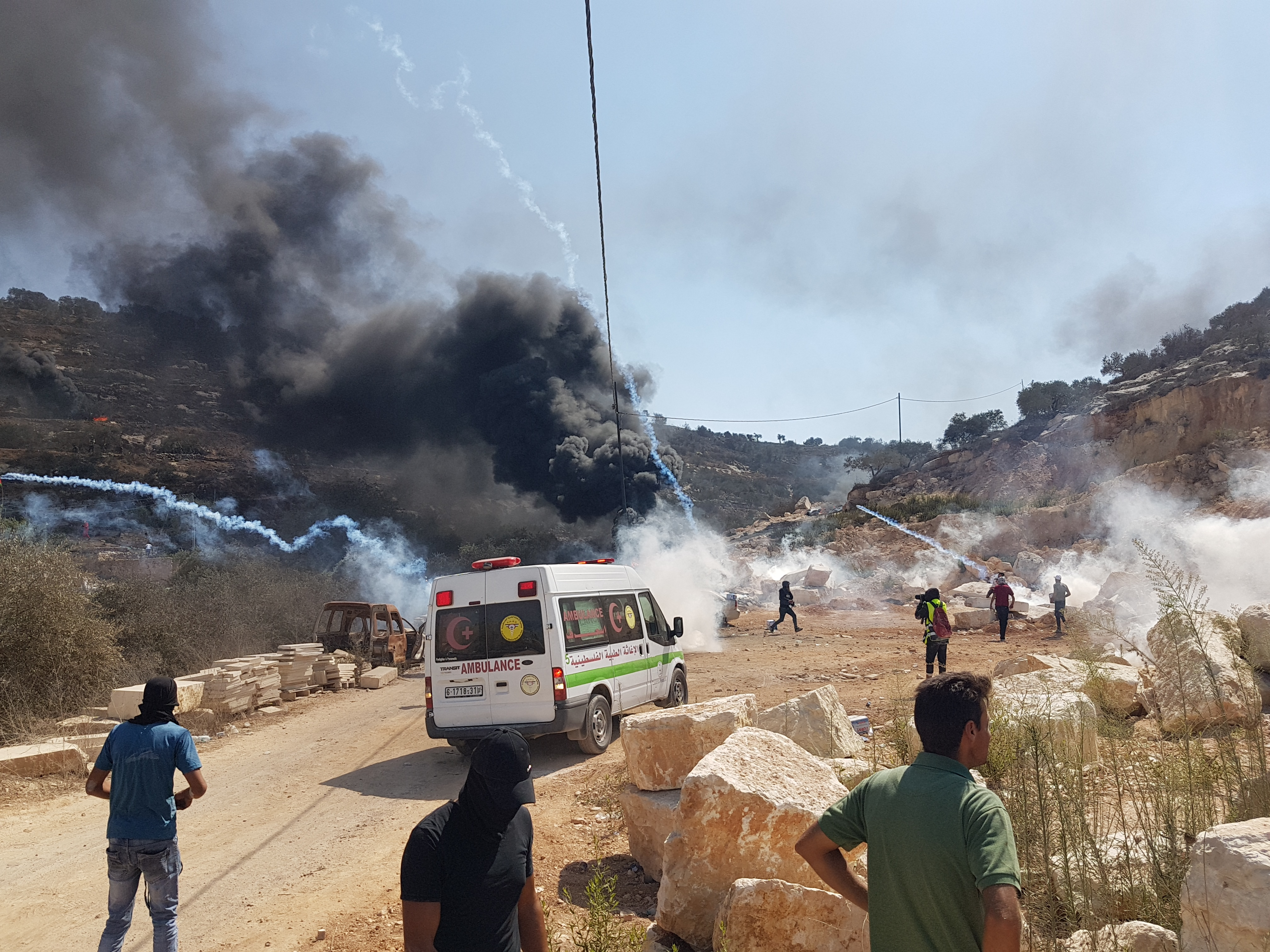
Protest against Evyatar, September 2021

== Land ownership and legal disputes ==
The land was historically owned by Palestinians, with at least seventeen Palestinian families claiming private ownership of the land on which the settlement was built. The Israeli government acknowledges that five families paid land tax for parts of Jabal Sabih in the 1930s. On 8 July 2021, the local councils of Beita, Yatma and Qabalan and nine Palestinians from Qabalan petitioned Israel's High Court of Justice to revoke this compromise on the grounds that they hold the rights to the land. On 15 August 2021, the Israeli Supreme Court refused to consider the appeal and postponed their examination until a State Land declaration is made.

In October 2021, 60 dunams (15 acres) was appropriated as state land, and in February 2022 then-attorney general Avichai Mandelblit approved forming a legal settlement there, encouraging the position of settler leader Yossi Dagan, head of the Samaria Regional Council for populating Evyatar and other outposts. The supporters of populating the outpost expected the post-2022 government led by Benjamin Netanyahu to promote this position.

On 27 June 2024, the Israeli cabinet authorized the settlement as well as outposts name Givat Assaf, Sde Efraim, Heletz, and Adorayim. Minister Bezalel Smotrich said the number corresponded to the five countries that recognized the State of Palestine in the prior month. On 8 July 2024 the Custodian of Government and Abandoned Property declared a 66-dunam parcel overlapping with Evyatar to be "state land," authorizing its use by settlers. According to Peace Now, "At least 11 buildings, the access road, and the central square in the outpost are [still] on private Palestinian land, which even according to the state’s method, must be evacuated."
