= Khirbet Jarra'a =

Archaeological site in West Bank

- Location within the West Bank
- 32°09′31″N 35°11′43″E
- Type: ruin
- Periods: Crusader/Ayyubid to Ottoman period
- Location: West Bank
- PAL: 168/173

Site notes
- Condition: In ruins

Khirbet Jarra'a (Arabic: الجراعة) also Khirbet Jerr'a is an archaeological site located in the West Bank, containing remnants of a medieval settlement.

== Archaeology ==
The site was surveyed by Porat and then by Finkelstein et al. Potsherds found here date from the Crusader/Ayyubid, Mamluk and early Ottoman periods, alongside two potsherds from Iron Age II.

Described as "well-preserved" by Finkelstein et al., the site features scattered buildings, some retaining their original vaults.

Porat's observations include the presence of a mosque. Records from the Mandatory Antiquities department also make note of a mosque with a mihrab.

== History ==
Khirbet Jarra'a is the site of Gerraa, a medieval town mentioned in a Frankish text dating back to 1166. The town is documented alongside several other nearby sites. Conder and Kitchener identified Khirbet Jarra'a with Garia, as depicted in Marino Sanuto's map.

Es-Sakhawi mentions a prominent Hanbali scholar born in Khirbet Jarra'a in 1422.

=== Ottoman era ===
The village was incorporated into the Ottoman Empire in 1517 with all of Palestine, and in 1596 it appeared under the name of Jarra'a in the tax registers as being in the Nahiya of Jabal Qubal, part of Nablus Sanjak. It had a population of 6 households, all Muslim. The villagers paid a fixed tax rate of 33.3% on various products, such as wheat, barley, summer crops, olives, goats and/or beehives, and a press for olives or grapes, in addition to "occasional revenues"; a total of 2,700 akçe. Ottoman defters list Khirbet Jarra'a as a small settlement, possibly an izba.

According to E. H. Palmer, the name means: "The ruin of the sandhill on which vegetation thrives."

== Bibliography ==
- Conder, C.R.; Kitchener, H.H. (1882). The Survey of Western Palestine: Memoirs of the Topography, Orography, Hydrography, and Archaeology. Vol. 2. London: Committee of the Palestine Exploration Fund.
- Finkelstein, I.; Lederman, Zvi, eds. (1997). Highlands of many cultures. Tel Aviv: Institute of Archaeology of Tel Aviv University Publications Section. ISBN 965-440-007-3.
- Hütteroth, W.-D.; Abdulfattah, K. (1977). Historical Geography of Palestine, Transjordan and Southern Syria in the Late 16th Century. Erlanger Geographische Arbeiten, Sonderband 5. Erlangen, Germany: Vorstand der Fränkischen Geographischen Gesellschaft. ISBN 3-920405-41-2. Archived from the original on 2023-01-17.
- Palmer, E.H. (1881). The Survey of Western Palestine: Arabic and English Name Lists Collected During the Survey by Lieutenants Conder and Kitchener, R. E. Transliterated and Explained by E.H. Palmer. Committee of the Palestine Exploration Fund.
