= 2013 Tapuah Junction stabbing =

Palestinian attack on an Israeli settler in the West Bank

- Location: 32°06′55″N 35°15′26″E; Tapuah Junction, Road 60, West Bank
- Date: 30 April 2013
- Attack type: stabbing
- Deaths: 1 Israeli civilian
- Injuries: 1 (perpetrator)
- Perpetrators: Salam As’ad Zaghal (according to Palestinian groups and media reports)

The 2013 Tapuah Junction stabbing occurred on 30 April, in which an armed Israeli settler, Evyatar Borovsky, was stabbed, disarmed and then, according to some witnesses, shot with his own weapon at a bus stop in the northern West Bank by a Palestinian resident of Tulkarem. The Israeli police described the attacker as a "Palestinian terrorist". The perpetrator was identified as Salam As'ad Zaghal, who had recently been released after completing a 3½ year jail sentence for planting explosives. The stabbing was praised by Palestinian President Mahmoud Abbas's Fatah party, its military wing, and its Islamist offshoot the Palestinian Mujahideen movement, and by Zaghal's family. Jewish settlers in the West Bank waged a series of violent reprisal attacks against Palestinian targets in the West Bank, and an Israeli outpost was later named in the victim's honor.

== Victim ==
The victim, Evyatar Borovsky, was a 32-year-old father of five. A native of Kfar Hasidim, he had been living in Yitzhar for the previous five years. His funeral took place that evening in Kfar Hasidim and was attended by more than a thousand people.

== Stabbing ==
According to witnesses, the Palestinian arrived at the scene in a taxi. He then approached Borovsky, who was standing at a hitchhiking spot at the junction, and attacked him from behind, stabbing him in the chest. The attacker stole Borovsky's gun and used it to shoot at security forces who arrived at the scene; it was unclear whether he also shot Borovsky. The assailant was then shot and wounded by border police, arrested, and taken to an Israeli hospital for treatment. Medical teams also attempted to save Borovsky's life on the scene, but were unsuccessful.

== Suspect ==
The perpetrator was identified by Palestinian groups and by the media as Palestinian man Salam As'ad Zaghal, 24, from the Tulkarem area. Salam had recently been released from an Israeli jail after serving a 42-month prison term for planting explosives along Israel's security barrier.

== Responses ==
=== Palestinian leadership ===
The attacker was praised as a "hero" by representatives of Palestinian President Mahmoud Abbas's Fatah party, who posted pictures from the scene of the attack on the party's official Facebook page. Each image was accompanied by a caption boasting of the stabber's "success."

- A picture of the stabbing victim bore the caption "The settler who was killed today at al-Za’atara south of Nablus by the released prisoner hero Salam As’ad Zaghal from the city of Tulkarem".
- A photograph of Zaghal with illustrations of two AK-47 rifles above his head bore the caption "Peace be with you the day of your birth, on the day of your imprisonment and on the day of your freedom".

Fatah's military wing, the Al-Aqsa Martyrs' Brigades, took responsibility for the attack, reportedly describing it as revenge for the deaths of Palestinian men Afafat Jaradat and Maysara Abu Hamdiya while in Israeli custody. Some, however, believe the attacker worked alone in an attempt to clear his family's name after his brother was accused of collaborating with Israel.

The Palestinian Mujahideen movement, an Islamist offshoot of Fatah, also congratulated the perpetrator of the attack. The movement's spokesman Abu-Omar wrote on its website: "We welcome any act of resistance against this corrupt enemy ... [The stabbing is a] natural response to the occupation's aggression and its continuous attacks on all things Palestinian in the West Bank."

=== Assailant's family ===
Salam Zaghal's father said: "It was destiny, and we take pride in him as a family. What he did is a duty for all Palestinians living with the aggression of the army and settlers". Israeli authorities suspect that the killing might have been an attempt to clear the family name, after Salam's brother, Abdulfattah, was convicted of spying for Israel by the Palestinian authorities; after having spent one year in Abdulfattah's 10-year sentence had been commuted "out of mercy for the impoverished family". Abdulfattah maintained that he had been wrongly accused, and the family denied any connection between his conviction and Salam's actions.

== Price tag attacks ==
Jewish settlers on the West Bank descended on the Palestinian town of Huwara in the hours after the killing. They attacked a bus with Palestinian school-girls with stones, shattering a wind-shield and wounding the driver.

In Umm al-Qutuf, three cars were set on fire and the local mosque was desecrated, in an apparent price tag attack for the Borovsky stabbing.

In what some called a "Co-ordinated attacks by settler militias on Palestinian property", a string of attacks followed on Palestinian property on the 30-day anniversary of the killing of Borovsky. 7 vehicles in the Palestinian West Bank villages of Zubaidat and Marj Najah, and another 7 vehicles in East Jerusalem were all vandalised. “Regards from Eviatar. God will avenge his blood,” was sprayed in Zubaidat. The tires of three cars were punctured in Beitillu with graffiti reading, "revenge", and on a nearby wall, undersigned with "price tag" the words "regards from Baruch Tzuri to Eviatar", alluding to Evyatar Borovsky.

== Israeli outpost creation ==
The Israeli outpost Evyatar was established in 2013 as a reaction to the killing and was named after the victim The outpost was illegal and has since been razed by Israeli authorities several times.

== See also ==
- Tapuah Junction stabbing (2010)
