= Einabus =

- Municipality type D (Village council)

Arabic transcription(s)
  - Arabic: عينابوس
  - Latin: Ainabus (official) 'Aynabus (unofficial)
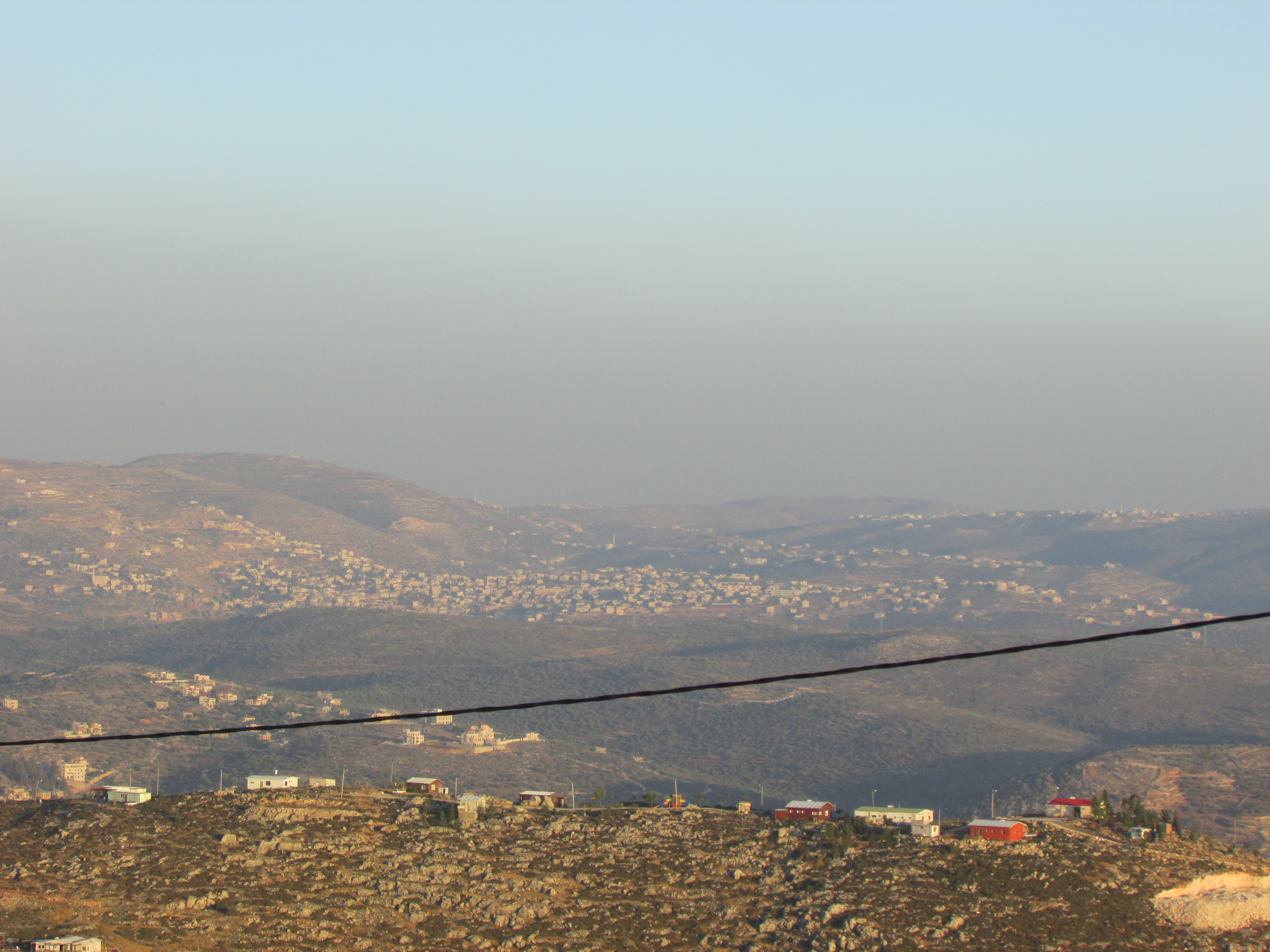
- In the front, beneath the telephone cable, is mount 725, an illegal Israeli outpost of Yitzhar. Beneath it, crossed by the telephone cable, is Einabus. Covering most of the farther area is the municipality of Qabalan. Behind the right side of Qabalan is Talfit, and behind it is Qaryut. Behind the middle of Qabalan is Ahijah.

- Location of Einabus within Palestine
- Coordinates: 32°08′48″N 35°14′42″E
- Palestine grid: 173/172
- State: State of Palestine
- Governorate: Nablus

Government
  - Type: Village council (from 1996)
  - Head of Municipality: Nafez Rashdan

Area
  - Total: 4.0 km^{2} (1.5 sq mi)

Population (2017)
  - Total: 2,891
  - Density: 720/km^{2} (1,900/sq mi)
- Name meaning: "The spring of Abus"

Einabus (Arabic: عينابوس) is a Palestinian village in the northern West Bank, located 12 kilometers (7 miles) south of Nablus and a part of the Nablus Governorate. Nearby towns include Huwara and Beita to the east and Jammain to the south.

== Location ==
‘Einabus is located 8.23 kilometers (5.11 mi) south of Nablus. It is bordered by Huwwara to the east, ‘Urif to the north, ‘Urif and Jamma'in to the west, and Jamma’in and Huwwara to the south.

== Archaeology ==
Tombs dug out of the rocks and ancient cisterns have been found here.

== History ==
Potsherds from Middle Bronze Age, LB/IA I, Iron Age II, Persian, Hellenistic, Roman and Crusader/Ayyubid era have been found.

The village's old mosque was built during that time and is dedicated to Umar ibn al-Khattab. Until today, olives and figs remain primary sources of income for the residents of Einabus.

The old mosque, Jama al-Arbain, was inspected in 1928 and 1942, and on a column was found inscribed the name Abdallah and the date 625 AH (=1227-1228 CE).

=== Ottoman era ===
The village was incorporated into the Ottoman Empire in 1517 with all of Palestine, and in 1596 it appeared in the tax registers as being in the Nahiya of Jabal Qubal, part of the Sanjak of Nablus. It had a population of 49 Muslim households. They paid a fixed tax-rate of 33.3% on agricultural products, including wheat, barley, summer crops, olives, and goats or beehives; a total of 5,317 akçe.

In 1838, Edward Robinson noted it on his travels as a village, named Ain Abus. It was noted was a village in the Jurat Merda district, south of Nablus.

In June, 1870, French explorer Victor Guérin found the village to have a spring (after which it was named), and having about 400 inhabitants. Below the village was a valley of olive trees.

In 1870/1871 (1288 AH), an Ottoman census listed the village in the nahiya (sub-district) of Jamma'in al-Thani, subordinate to Nablus.

In 1882, the PEF's Survey of Western Palestine described the village (called Ain Abus) as "a small village conspicuous on a low spur of the mountain, with a spring to the west and olives to the south."

=== British Mandate era ===
In the 1922 census of Palestine conducted by the British Mandate authorities, 'Ainabus had a population of 227 inhabitants, all Muslims, increasing slightly in the 1931 census to 244, still all Muslim, in a total of 62 houses.

In the 1945 census, the population was 340, all Muslims, with 4,011 dunams (991 acres; 4.011 km^{2}) of land, according to an official land and population survey. Of this, 539 dunams (133 acres; 0.539 km^{2}) were for plantations or irrigated land, 2,107 for cereals, while 29 dunams were built-up (urban) land.

=== Jordanian era ===
In the wake of the 1948 Arab–Israeli War, and after the 1949 Armistice Agreements, Einabus came under Jordanian rule.

The Jordanian census of 1961 found 524 inhabitants in Einabus.

=== Post-1967 ===
Since the Six-Day War in 1967, Einabus has been under Israeli occupation.

After the 1995 accords, 85% of the village land was classified as Area B, the remaining 15% as Area C. Israel has confiscated 114 dunums of Ein Abus land for the construction of the Israeli settlement of Yitzhar. Since Yitzhar was established, the villagers of Einabus have been the victims of several violent attacks from the Yitzhar settlers. The Israeli settlers have also stolen crops and damaged Palestinian homes.

As of 2012, Israeli settlers have also taken over land in Area B, in "a combination of unbridled thievery by settlers and impotence on the part of the Israeli authorities."

The village had a population of 1200 in 1987, according to the Palestinian Central Bureau of Statistics, and of 2,891 in 2017.

==== Infrastructure ====
There are two girls' secondary schools and one for boys. A charity center founded in 1984 contains a kindergarten and a training center for weaving and helps college-bound students that are financially unable to enter college to attend. In addition to the old mosque, Einabus has two modern mosques.

==== Government ====
Einabus is governed by a village council of seven elected members including the chairman or mayor. In 2005, Nafez Rashdan was elected mayor of Einabus.

== Bibliography ==
- Barron, J.B., ed. (1923). Palestine: Report and General Abstracts of the Census of 1922. Government of Palestine.
- Conder, C.R.; Kitchener, H.H. (1882). The Survey of Western Palestine: Memoirs of the Topography, Orography, Hydrography, and Archaeology. Vol. 2. London: Committee of the Palestine Exploration Fund.
- Dauphin, C. (1998). La Palestine byzantine, Peuplement et Populations. BAR International Series 726 (in French). Vol. III : Catalogue. Oxford: Archeopress. ISBN 0-860549-05-4.
- Finkelstein, I.; Lederman, Zvi, eds. (1997). Highlands of many cultures. Tel Aviv: Institute of Archaeology of Tel Aviv University Publications Section. ISBN 965-440-007-3.
- Government of Jordan, Department of Statistics (1964). First Census of Population and Housing. Volume I: Final Tables; General Characteristics of the Population (PDF).
- Government of Palestine, Department of Statistics (1945). Village Statistics, April, 1945.
- Guérin, V. (1875). Description Géographique Historique et Archéologique de la Palestine (in French). Vol. 2: Samarie, pt. 2. Paris: L'Imprimerie Nationale.
- Hadawi, S. (1970). Village Statistics of 1945: A Classification of Land and Area ownership in Palestine. Palestine Liberation Organization Research Center.
- Hütteroth, W.-D.; Abdulfattah, K. (1977). Historical Geography of Palestine, Transjordan and Southern Syria in the Late 16th Century. Erlanger Geographische Arbeiten, Sonderband 5. Erlangen, Germany: Vorstand der Fränkischen Geographischen Gesellschaft. ISBN 3-920405-41-2.
- Mills, E., ed. (1932). Census of Palestine 1931. Population of Villages, Towns and Administrative Areas. Jerusalem: Government of Palestine.
- Palmer, E.H. (1881). The Survey of Western Palestine: Arabic and English Name Lists Collected During the Survey by Lieutenants Conder and Kitchener, R. E. Transliterated and Explained by E.H. Palmer. Committee of the Palestine Exploration Fund.
- Robinson, E.; Smith, E. (1841). Biblical Researches in Palestine, Mount Sinai and Arabia Petraea: A Journal of Travels in the year 1838. Vol. 2. Boston: Crocker & Brewster.
- Robinson, E.; Smith, E. (1841). Biblical Researches in Palestine, Mount Sinai and Arabia Petraea: A Journal of Travels in the year 1838. Vol. 3. Boston: Crocker & Brewster.
- Sharon, M. (2004). Corpus Inscriptionum Arabicarum Palaestinae, D-F. Vol. 3. BRILL. ISBN 90-04-13197-3.
