= Asira al-Qibliya =

’Asira al-Qibliya
- Municipality type C

Arabic transcription(s)
  - Arabic: عصيرة القبلية
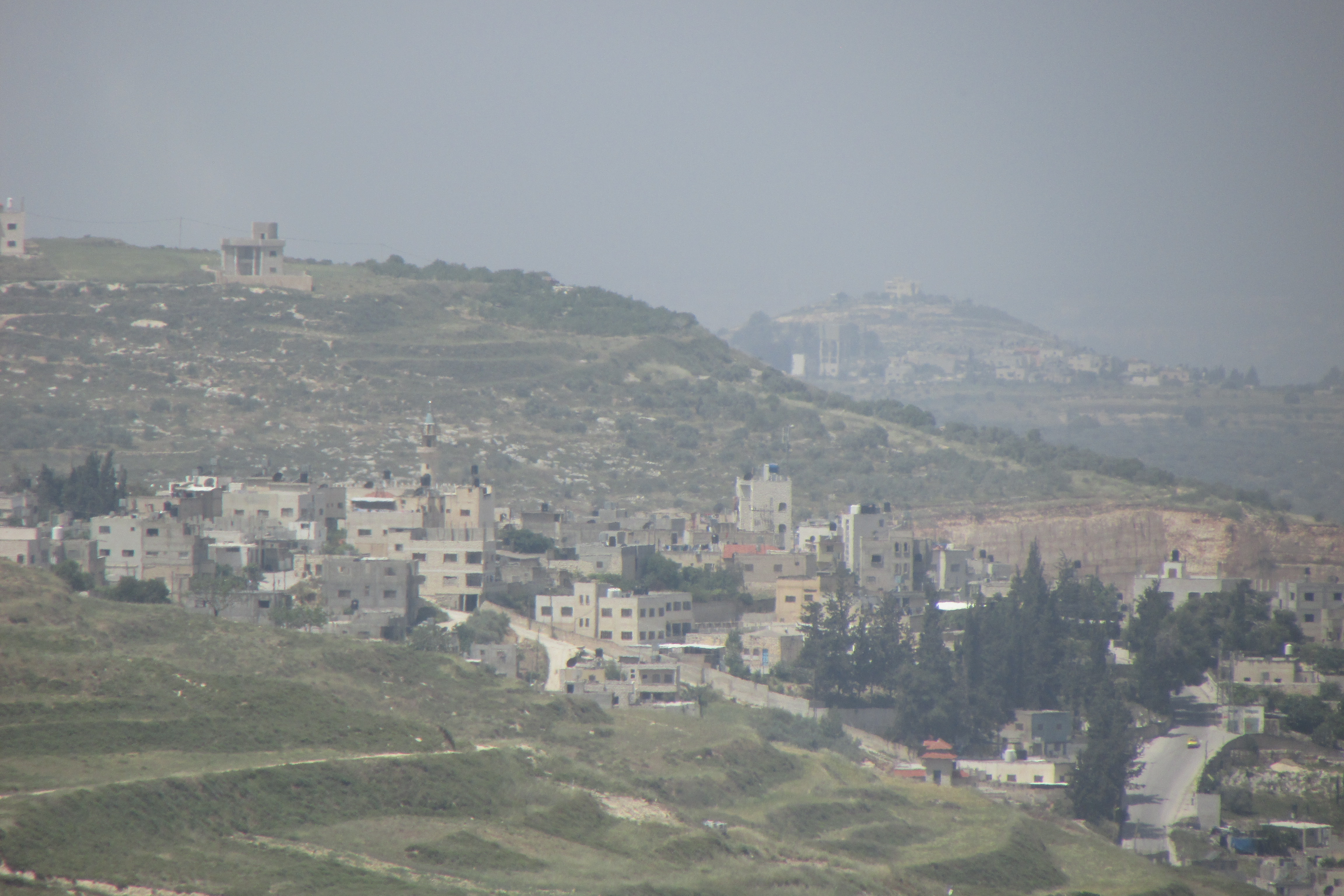
- Part of Asira al-Qibliya

- Location of ’Asira al-Qibliya within Palestine
- Coordinates: 32°10′44″N 35°12′53″E
- Palestine grid: 170/176
- Country: Palestine
- Governorate: Nablus

Government
  - Type: Municipality

Area
  - Total: 6.4 km^{2} (2.5 sq mi)

Population (2017)
  - Total: 2,935
  - Density: 460/km^{2} (1,200/sq mi)
- Name meaning: "The southern difficulty"

’Asira al-Qibliya (Arabic: عصيرة القبلية) is a Palestinian village in the Nablus Governorate in the eastern West Bank, located southwest of Nablus. According to the Palestinian Central Bureau of Statistics (PCBS), the village had a population of 2,935 inhabitants in 2017.

== Location ==
‘Asira al Qibliya is located 6.24 kilometers (3.88 mi) south of Nablus. It is bordered by Madama and Burin to the east, Tell and Madama to the north, Tell and Zeita Jamma'in to the west, and Jamma'in and Urif to the south.

== History ==
Asira al-Qibliya is situated on an ancient site on low ground. Carved stones have been reused in village houses and agricultural terraces. Rock-cut cisterns have also been found, together with Byzantine ceramics.

=== Ottoman era ===
The village was incorporated into the Ottoman Empire in 1517 with all of Palestine, and in 1596 it appeared in the tax registers under the name of 'Asirah, as being in the nahiya of Jabal Qubal, part of Sanjak Nablus. It had a population of 33 households and 6 bachelors, all Muslim. The inhabitants of the village paid fixed tax rate of 33.3% on wheat, barley, summer crops, olive trees, and goats and/or beehives; a total of 5,700 akçe.

In 1838, ‘Asira was located in the District of Jurat 'Amra, south of Nablus.

Victor Guérin visited the village (which he called A'sirah) in 1870, and he estimated it had three hundred inhabitants. He further noted that the medhafeh, or guest-house, was situated on the highest ground in the village.

In 1870/1871 (1288 AH), an Ottoman census listed the village in the nahiya (sub-district) of Jamma'in al-Thani, subordinate to Nablus.

In 1882, the PEF's Survey of Western Palestine (SWP) described Asiret al Kibliyeh as a village of moderate size on low ground, with a well to the south-east.

=== British Mandate era ===
In the 1922 census of Palestine, conducted by the British Mandate authorities, ‘Asira al-Qebliyeh had a population of 282 Muslims, increasing in the 1931 census to 326, still all Muslim, in 84 houses.

In the 1945 statistics the population was 410, all Muslims, with 6,437 dunams of land, according to an official land and population survey. Of this, 345 dunams were plantations and irrigable land, 2,963 were used for cereals, while 57 dunams were built-up (urban) land.

=== Jordanian era ===
In the wake of the 1948 Arab–Israeli War, and after the 1949 Armistice Agreements, Asira al-Qibliya came under Jordanian rule.

The Jordanian census of 1961 found 718 inhabitants.

=== Post-1967 ===
Since the Six-Day War in 1967, Asira al-Qibliya has been under Israeli occupation.

After the 1995 accords, 72% of village land was classified as Area B, the remaining 28% as Area C. Israel has confiscated 495 dunams of land from Asira al-Qibliya in order to construct the Israeli settlement of Yitzhar.

== Settler violence ==
Settler violence is a cause for concern. Settlers from the nearby Yitzhar also continue to enter the village's farmlands. From 2008 to 2011, there were numerous reported cases of both violence and arson in the village. As of 2012, Asira Al-Qibiliya and its inhabitants have been repeatedly attacked, targeted and threatened by settlers for which there have been few or no convictions.

In 2012 there were several reported incidents of settler violence. On May 19, 2012, during rock throwing clashes after settlers, apparently from the nearby Yitzhar settlement, came to the village, a settler shot and wounded Fathi Assayara, a 24-year-old Palestinian. Five Palestinians were injured by the rock throwing. According to B'Tselem, IDF soldiers "didn't take any measures to stop the settlers from throwing stones, lighting fires, and firing live rounds at the Palestinians". B'Tselem published several videos of the incident. Abraham Benjamin, spokesman for the Yitzhar settlement, said settlers were responding to series of fires set by "the Arabs from the town" and that "it can be plainly seen that the use of weapons by the IDF or the security team was warranted by a real danger to life".

In mid-2013, the US government requested protection by the IDF for a USAID project that is building a water cistern Asira al-Qibliya. The project and its employees had been repeatedly attacked by settlers from Yitzhar.

The settlers of Yitzhar would routinely claim that the villagers of Asira al-Qibliya provoked them. The Palestinian villagers were then, in 2012, given cameras to document the attacks, and the video evidence they provided (and published on YouTube and elsewhere) forced the IDF to act. The result was that the Yitzhar settlers attacked the IDF. By 2014, calls were mounting to classify these Israeli settlers as terrorists. The villagers of Asira al-Qibliya found it a case of "too little, too late." One villager put it: "It is only words. We don't want words, we want deeds." Israeli writer Amos Oz noted that “Our neo-Nazi groups enjoy the support of numerous nationalist or even racist legislators."

== Demography ==
=== Local origins ===
The majority of Asira al-Qibliya's residents have their origins in Burin.

== Bibliography ==
- Barron, J.B., ed. (1923). Palestine: Report and General Abstracts of the Census of 1922. Government of Palestine.
- Conder, C.R.; Kitchener, H.H. (1882). The Survey of Western Palestine: Memoirs of the Topography, Orography, Hydrography, and Archaeology. Vol. 2. London: Committee of the Palestine Exploration Fund.
- Dauphin, C. (1998). La Palestine byzantine, Peuplement et Populations. BAR International Series 726 (in French). Vol. III : Catalogue. Oxford: Archeopress. ISBN 0-860549-05-4.
- Government of Jordan, Department of Statistics (1964). First Census of Population and Housing. Volume I: Final Tables; General Characteristics of the Population (PDF).
- Government of Palestine, Department of Statistics (1945). Village Statistics, April, 1945.
- Guérin, V. (1875). Description Géographique Historique et Archéologique de la Palestine (in French). Vol. 2: Samarie, pt. 2. Paris: L'Imprimerie Nationale.
- Hadawi, S. (1970). Village Statistics of 1945: A Classification of Land and Area ownership in Palestine. Palestine Liberation Organization Research Center.
- Hütteroth, W.-D.; Abdulfattah, K. (1977). Historical Geography of Palestine, Transjordan and Southern Syria in the Late 16th Century. Erlanger Geographische Arbeiten, Sonderband 5. Erlangen, Germany: Vorstand der Fränkischen Geographischen Gesellschaft. ISBN 3-920405-41-2.
- Mills, E., ed. (1932). Census of Palestine 1931. Population of Villages, Towns and Administrative Areas. Jerusalem: Government of Palestine.
- Palmer, E.H. (1881). The Survey of Western Palestine: Arabic and English Name Lists Collected During the Survey by Lieutenants Conder and Kitchener, R. E. Transliterated and Explained by E.H. Palmer. Committee of the Palestine Exploration Fund.
- Robinson, E.; Smith, E. (1841). Biblical Researches in Palestine, Mount Sinai and Arabia Petraea: A Journal of Travels in the year 1838. Vol. 3. Boston: Crocker & Brewster.
