= Yitzhar =

Israeli settlement in the West Bank

Yitzhar: יִצְהָר (Hebrew)
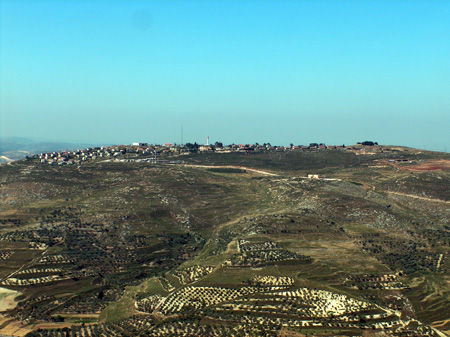

- Location within the Northern West Bank
- Coordinates: 32°10′5″N 35°14′11″E
- Country: Palestine
- District: Judea and Samaria Area
- Council: Shomron
- Region: West Bank
- Affiliation: Amana
- Founded: 1984
- Founder: Amana
- Population (2024): 2,525

Yitzhar (Hebrew: יִצְהָר) is an Israeli settlement located in the West Bank, south of the city of Nablus, just off Route 60, north of the Tapuach Junction. The predominantly Orthodox Jewish community falls under the jurisdiction of Shomron Regional Council. In 2024, it had a population of 2,525.

The international community considers Israeli settlements in the West Bank illegal under international law, but the Israeli government disputes this.

The area where Yitzhar is located was determined as Area C under the Oslo Accords.

In 2008, the New York Times described Yitzhar as "an extremist bastion on the hilltops commanding the Palestinian city of Nablus ... [where] a local war is ... being waged". The inhabitants of Yitzhar have a reputation as being among the most extreme Israeli settlers, and regularly clash with members of the Israeli security forces and local Palestinian civilians. The settlement is at the forefront of the settler movement's so called "price tag" policy, which calls for attacks against Palestinians in retaliation for actions of the Israeli government against West Bank settlements. In May 2014, Shin Bet said the price-tag hate crimes were mainly attributable to about 100 extremist youth, mostly from Yitzhar, acting on ideas associated with rabbi Yitzchak Ginsburg at the community's Od Yosef Chai yeshiva.

== History ==
The settlement was originally established in 1983 as a pioneer Nahal military outpost, and de-militarized a year later, when turned over to residential purposes in 1984 with the assistance of Gush Emunim's settlement organization, Amana. The settlement continuously grew from a population of 200 in 1994 to almost 400 in 2002, and reached a population of 895 in 2009, predominantly strictly religious Jewish settlers.

The Nahal settlement was called "Rogen", a play on words from the Hebrew root meaning "annoyance". The Hebrew term "yitzhar" was already used in biblical times (f.e. Deuteronomy 7:13), meaning "high quality olive oil", and derives from one of the region's major industries.

According to ARIJ, Israel confiscated land from six Palestinian towns/villages nearby in order to construct Yitzhar:

- 495 dunams from Asira al-Qibliya,
- 282 dunums from Huwara,
- 233 dunums from Burin,
- 139 dunams from Madama,
- 114 dunums from Einabus,
- 58 dunums from Urif.

== Geography ==
Yitzhar is situated east of the Israel–West bank separation barrier, 20.5 kilometers from the Green line, in the mountain-range area about 10 km southwest of Nablus. One of the Israeli settlements ringing the city of Nablus, Yitzhar is built on the ridge of Salmen al Parsi, a mountain 808 meters above sea level south of Mount Gerizim.

The settlement has a total area of 1,663 dunams, and is zoned for over one thousand families in single family homes.

== Outposts ==
Yitzhar has several unauthorized outposts which are illegal according to Israeli law. Lehavat Yitzhar, established in 1998, has ten families and five caravans, and six permanent structures. Shalhevet Farm (Yitzhar West), established in 1999, has eight families and thirteen caravans, and nine permanent houses. Hill 725, established in 2001 outside the boundaries of the parent settlement Yitzhar, has 23 inhabitants and six caravans, and two permanent structures. Mitzpe Yitzhar, established in 2002 outside the boundaries of the parent settlement Yitzhar, has six structures, and was dismantled in May 2004 for the third time, but in early 2005, it was re-established. Shalhevet Ya has three permanent houses and a caravan.

On 21 August 2013, settlers razed Palestinian land with bulldozers to expand the Yitzhar settlement. They were protected by Israeli soldiers.

In August 2024, the United States placed one individual, the security coordinator (ravshatz) from Yitzhar on its Specially Designated Nationals blacklist. The move followed a statement by Ronen Bar, head of the Shin Bet, that settlers and hilltop youth were engaged in terrorism. The individual sanctioned is Yitzhak Levi Filant, described as involved in 'the intimidation of Palestinians with the aim of seizing their land.'Filant's salary is paid by Israel's Ministry of Defense. The U.S. blocked his assets while forbidding organizations from dealing with him. The office of Prime Minister Binjamin Netanyahu responded that Israel regards with the utmost severity the imposition of sanctions' Israeli citizens. Filant regards himself as a one-man shabak controlling the whole of the Jabal Salman valley, whose Palestinian inhabitants should regard him as their 'mukhtar, their chief, mayor and sheriff.'

== Economy ==
The settlement has, olives, vineyards, a winery, and wheat fields. Only Israeli labor is employed, and all private homes, community buildings, and internal roads and development are done by Jews only, mainly residents of the settlement itself, according to the Shomron Regional Council's website.

== Education ==
Education is a priority of the community, and several institutions operate locally: a day-care center, pre-schools, the boy's Zilberman Talmud Torah, and the Od Yosef Chai ("Joseph Still Lives") institutions headed by Rabbi Yitzhak Shapira, comprising the Dorshei Yichudcha yeshiva high school, a post-high school yeshiva gedola, previously located in Joseph's Tomb Nablus, headed by Rabbi Yitzhak Ginzburg, and a kollel. The yeshiva, built illegally according to the IDF military prosecutor, supports the so-called "price tag" policy, and senior rabbis of the yeshiva are suspected to encourage students to attack Palestinians and Palestinian property, and the Israeli security forces. Several students affiliated with the yeshiva were forbidden to enter the West Bank on "well-founded suspicions that these students had been involved in attacks on Arabs, including 'price tag' attacks on Arab property".

In 2003, rabbi Ginzburg who is a member of the Chabad Lubavitch Hasidic movement, was indicted for incitement to racism in his book "Tipul Shoresh" ("Root Treatment"), which contains calls for the Arabs to be expelled from Israel, and for the land to be "cleansed" of foreigners, and compares the Arabs to a cancer. Previous demands to indict Ginzburg had been rejected by Attorney General Elyakim Rubinstein in 2001, and following the 1998 publication of Ginzburg's book Baruch Hagever ("Baruch the Man"), which praised the mass murderer Baruch Goldstein. Ginzburg was offered an end to all criminal proceedings against him in return for his explicitly and publicly retracting his offensive statements about Arabs.

In January 2010, Shapira was arrested for alleged involvement in the torching of a Palestinian mosque in the village of Yasuf, after five of his students had been arrested on suspicion of torching the mosque's carpet and book closet and obstructing the investigation. Shapira, who refused to say which of his students had taken part in the attack, was released a day after his arrest.

An investigation into the book Torat HaMelech ("The King's Torah"), co-written by Shapira and rabbi Yosef Elitzur-Hershkowitz, which discusses the rules of war, and states that in certain situations, non-Jews can be killed, including babies of enemy forces "because of the future danger they may present", led to a police raid of the Od Yosef Chai yeshiva in Yitzhar. Police detained Shapira and Elitzur-Hershkowitz in Summer 2010 for questioning on suspicion of incitement to racial violence, possession of a racist text, and possession of material that incites to violence.

According to Haaretz, Israeli security service Shin Bet is urging the Education Ministry to stop funding the Od Yosef Chai Yeshiva in Yitzhar. In 2009, the yeshiva high school received NIS 468,000, and the yeshiva gedola received NIS 847,000 from the Education Ministry. The yeshiva also got NIS 707,000 from the Social Affairs Ministry for a project to rehabilitate ultra-Orthodox drop-outs, and an additional NIS 156,000 to operate a dormitory. In January 2011, it was decided not to transfer funds to the yeshiva gedola, but after political pressure was applied, the yeshiva received a letter saying funding would be restored. Od Yosef Chai, for its part, is preparing to petition the High Court of Justice if its funding is halted.

In November 2011, Israel's Education Ministry decided to withhold funds from the Od Yosef Chai yeshiva and close down the Dorshei Yehudcha Yeshiva high school. The decision was based on information received from the defense establishment of extensive involvement by students and rabbis in violent acts against Palestinian residents and Israeli security forces.

== Violent incidents ==
The inhabitants of Yitzhar, belonging to a category known as hardal (religiously ultra-Orthodox as well as nationalist), have a reputation as being among the most extreme Israeli settlers, and regularly clash with local Palestinian civilians. From the late 1980s through the next decade, Yitzhar youth were accused of arson at a nearby mosque, firing on Palestinian cars, torching Palestinian fields and olive groves, and rampaging through neighboring villages. In 1989, two yeshiva students were convicted of aggravated assault, after a rampage led to the killing of a local 13-year-old girl, and injuries to an 82-year-old man. The settlement is at the forefront of the settler movement's so-called "price tag" policy, which calls for attacks against Palestinians in retaliation for actions of the Israeli government against West Bank settlements. A reserve officer serving in the area, commenting on incidents where Israeli soldiers were punished or attacked for carrying out demolition orders, is on records as stating:

"You never know if a patrol in the community and its surroundings won't end with a barrage of stones", says a reserve officer who served there. "And the most irritating thing is that later on in the army, and in the community, they'll feed you with the Shabbat cakes they bring and tell you to let it be, because it's just a few psychos."

Settlers from Yitzhar destroy olive trees in Burin, September 2024

=== 1998 ===
Two Yitzhar residents, Harel Bin-Nun, 18, and Shlomo Liebman, 24, were shot and killed while patrolling a track newly dug to expand the settlement, in an ambush by Arabs on 5 August 1998. Yitzhar settlers reacted by leading an armed funeral cortege past local Palestinian villages, and stating they would expand the settlement in two divisions named after the dead residents, a proposal that received the backing of Binyamin Netanyahu.

=== 2002 ===
In September 2002, a Palestinian militant shot and injured four soldiers during an attempt to infiltrate Yitzhar. He was shot and killed by security forces.

=== 2004 ===
On 9 June 2004, a Palestinian goatherd complained that a resident of Yitzhar had stolen his goats. The police escorted him to the settlement, and returned the goats to him, but when he was getting back to his village, he was attacked by settlers, who once again took the goats from him. A police unit rushed down to arrest the settlers, while members of Yitzhar's readiness unit went down in the direction of the assault. The police claimed that the members of the readiness group blocked their way and interfered with their actions, and arrested the four men, accusing them of armed robbery, assault, stealing goats from a Palestinian, and preventing the police from doing their job.

The four settlers filed a lawsuit that was partially accepted in March 2010 by the Jerusalem Magistrate's Court which ruled that the police had presented false and misleading testimony by declaring that the four men were involved in the assault and had stolen "the sheep", while they had not witnessed the attacks against the goatherd. The judge ordered the state to pay NIS 10,000 to each of the four plaintiffs, and to their lawyer.

=== 2008 ===
On 13 September 2008, a Palestinian entered the Yitzhar outpost Shalhevet, set fire to a family house whose inhabitants were away for the weekend, and stabbed a nine-year-old boy who had spotted him and tried to call for help, wounding him lightly. Dozens of settlers from Yitzhar responded by marching through the adjacent Palestinian village of Asira al-Qibliya, where the attacker was thought to live, using live fire and wounding eight people, torching dozens of Palestinian homes and buildings, with Israeli soldiers present, in what then-Israeli Prime Minister Ehud Olmert called a "pogrom". One week later, a fourteen-year-old teenager from Asira al-Qibliya, was shot dead by Israeli border police while walking toward Yitzhar, intending to throw a Molotov cocktail at the settlement. Police later said they had identified him as the attacker of the boy, thanks to forensic evidence. The teenager was also confirmed to have been the brother of the 2002 shooter.

=== 2011 ===
In 2011, UNOCHA reported 70 attacks by Yitzhar settlers on Palestinians.

Four inhabitants of Yitzhar were arrested on 13 June 2011 on suspicion of incitement and attacks on public order, including a minor suspected of setting fire to Palestinian property, after Israeli police raided the "Hakol Hayehudi" (The Jewish Voice) news site run from Yitzhar.

On 2 August 2011, Israel Defense Forces' GOC Central Command issued administrative restraining orders against 12 settlers from Yitzhar and nearby outposts, and a student at the local yeshiva on suspicions that they were involved in attacks on Palestinians. Nine of the settlers were ordered to stay out of the West Bank, and three to leave the settlement. In response, the Israeli NGO B'Tselem issued a statement condemning the use of administrative orders which are issued without charges being filed, without trial and without judicial sanction, stating "the move is an unacceptable means of dealing with lawbreakers in the West Bank. Firm action must be taken against settlers who harm Palestinians and Palestinian property, but this must be carried out through the criminal-justice system and not by issuing administrative orders based on classified material."

After the IDF had razed two buildings in the outpost Mitzpe Yitzhar in December 2011, a mosque in the Palestinian village of Burqa near Ramallah was torched, and "Mitpze Yitzhar", "war", and "price tag" spray-painted in Hebrew on the mosque's exterior wall, and vandals thought to have come from Mitzpe Yitzhar had spray-painted slogans in Hebrew, including "price-tag", "Yitzhar", and comments insulting Muhammad, on the exterior walls of a mosque in the Palestinian town of Bani Na'im.

=== 2012 ===
Several incidents occurred in May and June 2012, many of them on Saturdays, the Jewish Sabbath. A video of an incident of Saturday 19 May 2012, released by the Israeli NGO B'Tselem, shows a large number of young men from the settlement of Yitzhar descending towards the nearby Palestinian village of Asira al-Qubliya, young Palestinian men from Asira al-Qubliya coming out to confront the settlers when they approach the village, as well as burning fields later on, and heavily armed Israeli settlers shooting at and wounding a young Palestinian, with Israeli soldiers standing by and doing nothing to prevent the shooting. Yitzhar's spokesman said in a telephone interview with the BBC that "the incident had been started by the Palestinian villagers who ... had deliberately set fire to their own land in order to try and burn down the Jewish settlement", in what he called "arson terror", claiming that the settlers had gone down the hill to try and extinguish the fire, and were "attacked by hundreds of Arab rioters hurling rocks at them". Although it is not possible to tell who started the fire from the videos, it shows that there was no fire burning when the young settlers went down the hill. According to the BBC, the villagers of Asira al-Qubliya point out that it was their fields that were burned, and that the fire was much closer to their own village than to the Israeli settlement. The Israeli military issued a statement saying that it was investigating, and that "it appears that the video in question does not reflect the incident in its entirety". A week later, a Palestinian was shot and wounded by a settler from Yitzhar in clashes which started when a group of settlers set fire to fields belonging to the Palestinian village of Urif.

In early June 2012, police opened a criminal investigation into two shootings, in which members of the Yitzhar rapid response security team opened fire in the direction of Palestinians during clashes between settler youths and local Palestinians, and confiscated weapons from five members of the security team. The Israeli NGO B'Tselem, which released video footage of both incidents, accused the IDF and Border Police of refusing to make settlers leave the area and of not acting to protect the Palestinians, but an IDF investigation found that the soldiers had acted correctly.

A Palestinian and an Israeli security guard for the Yitzhar settlement were injured in clashes on 17 December 2012 outside the settlement, after a Palestinian shepherd approached the settlement and a group of Palestinians began hurling rocks at guards and IDF soldiers which responded with riot dispersal means. According to the Israeli NGO Yesh Din, who had a field worker observing the incident, masked settlers had started the clashes by throwing stones.

=== 2013 ===
On 1 April 2013, eight Palestinian schoolgirls were reportedly lightly wounded when their bus was attacked by stone-throwing settlers near Yitzhar.

On 30 April 2013, a 31-year-old Yitzhar resident, Eviatar Borovsky, was stabbed to death at the Tapuach Junction by a 24-year-old Palestinian from a village near Tulkarm who had been released some six months earlier from an Israeli jail after serving three years in prison for throwing stones. In retaliation, settlers from Yitzhar reportedly smashed the window of a mosque in the village of Urif and tried to burn it down, set fire to fields in Palestinian villages, and stoned two buses carrying Palestinian schoolgirls, lightly injuring two girls and one of the drivers.

=== 2014 ===
On 8 April 2014, hundreds of Yitzhar residents attacked a Border Police force, hurling stones, burning tires, and vandalizing equipment. IDF soldiers were watching the scene without intervening, when settlers destroyed an army outpost. The Border Police had come to the community to demolish five illegally built structures, after Yitzhar residents had punctured the tires of military vehicles in two earlier instances. The Yitzhar settlers subsequently destroyed an IDF post. After soldiers asked them to refrain from damaging their personal belongings, they complied with the request by restricting their damage to military infrastructure. In response, armed Israeli soldiers seized control of the Ode Yosef Chai ("Joseph Yet Lives") seminary, which also functions as a synagogue, and built a barbed-wire cordon around the building. Six former heads of Israel's Shin Bet security agency described the attack by the settlers in an interview with Yediot Ahronot as an episode of "Jewish terror".

A young woman from Yitzhar was arrested in May for incitement of violence, after posting on a community e-mail site the remark:

"I support throwing rocks (at Jews, and of course on Arabs without question). In certain circumstances—even if the rocks lead to the death of a soldier!!!"

=== 2021 ===
In October 2021, a Palestinian tried to perform a stabbing attack in Yitzhar with a kitchen knife. The IDF said that they had "neutralized" the attacker but did not give further explanation.

=== 2022 ===
An 82-year old Palestinian man was injured by suspected settlers close to Yitzhar, which police suspected as a response to a recent terrorist attack that killed two people in Hadera.
