= Keida =

Israeli settlement in the West Bank

Coordinates: 32°2′59″N 35°20′27″E

Keida (Hebrew: קידה), also transcribed Kida, is an Israeli settlement in the West Bank named after a genus of flower that grows in the region. It is situated just off the Allon Road, a five-minute drive east of Shilo, which is the mother-town of these settlements. It forms one of six Israeli settlements, built on land seized from the Palestinian villages of Jalud, Qaryut, Turmus Ayya and al-Mughayir. Among the other settlements belonging to the group are Shvut Rachel, Giv'at Har'el, Esh Kodesh, Ahiya and Adei Ad. Keida was established without a master plan or permission to build. The international community considers Israeli settlements in the West Bank illegal under international law, but the Israeli government disputes this.

By 2009, it comprised 35 portable homes., while in 2021 population of the Keida outpost consisted of some 80 settler families.

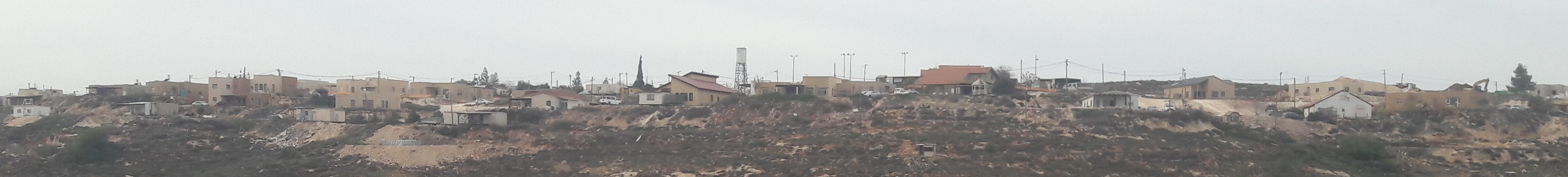
Panoramic photo of Keida, 2017

== History ==
Keida was founded in 2003. Originally, it was supposed to be built on an abandoned army base of the same name but was later moved to an adjacent hilltop. The outpost is under the jurisdiction of the Mateh Binyamin Regional Council. The outposts in the group confiscated for Israeli settler use some 70% of the Palestinian village of Jalud's agricultural land. (Note: "More than 1200 dunums of the (Jalud) village land were confiscated for colonial activities and around 90% of the village lands (that is more than 10,000 dunums) was declared military zones turning the village into an isolated area only for the protection of colonists." (POICA 2014))

There is no public transportation serving Keida. The only means of transportation are car or hitchhiking. Access is difficult, since Keida, like the 5 other illegal outposts, is surrounded by several checkpoints. No journalists, Israeli or otherwise, were permitted into Keida until 2009. Though most of the outpost structures are under demolition orders, which are not implemented, as of 2018 the American tourist booking company Airbnb listed Keida as a "neighbourhood", (Note: "Israel, ... has tried to avoid international censure by registering outposts..as 'neighborhoods' of established settlements, though some are far apart and function as separate communities." (Kershner 2016)) with accommodation for visiting guests. (Note: Under protest, Airbnb delisted West Bank settlements from its tourist rental coverage. The move was branded as one of the 10 most egregious "antisemitic" incidents of 2018 by the Simon Wiesenthal Center (Simon Wiesenthal Center 2018, p. 3; Stern-Weiner 2021, p. 4).)

One of its settlers, Yair Hirsch, was appointed by Avichai Mandelblit, the Attorney General of the Naftali Bennett government in 2021 to the post of Interior Minister director general. His residence in Keida was built in violation of Israeli building laws, and is subject to a demolition order.

On December 11, 2025, the Israeli government legalized Keida.

== Incidents ==
According to Palestinian testimonies, on 15 February 2011 3 settlers from Keida shot Wael Toubasy (16) in the stomach as he was walking home with his brother from their family's olive groves. Their father Mahmoud also reported being shot at by settlers from Keida in 2001 while he was driving his tractor.

== Sources ==
- "2018 Top Ten Worst Global Anti-Semitic Incidents" (PDF). Simon Wiesenthal Center. 2018.
- "Analysis: Concerns over rising violence in West Bank". Unispal. 28 February 2011 – via UNISPAL.
- "Bed and Breakfast on Stolen Land". Human Rights Watch. 20 November 2018.
- "Expansion of Shvut Rahel on Jalud lands". POICA: Monitoring Israel in the occupied territories. 1 March 2014.
- "The Geneva Convention". BBC News. 10 December 2009.
- Hass, Amira (17 August 2021). "'The Most Dedicated Teachers of Antisemitsm Live Among Us". Haaretz.
- Kershner, Isabel (30 August 2016). "Israel Quietly Legalizes Pirate Outposts in the West Bank". The New York Times.
- Koutsoukis, Jason (29 August 2009). "Settlers stake out a life on conflict's edge". The Sydney Morning Herald.
- Peleg, Bar; Shezaf, Hagar (9 August 2021). "Senior Israeli Official's Appointment Approved Despite Demolition Order for His Settlement Home". Haaretz.
- Stern-Weiner, Jamie (April 2021). "The Politics of a Definition: How the IHRA Working Definition of Antisemitism Is Being Misrepresented" (PDF). Free Speech on Israel.
