= Yariv Oppenheimer =

Israeli human rights activist

- יריב אופנהיימר
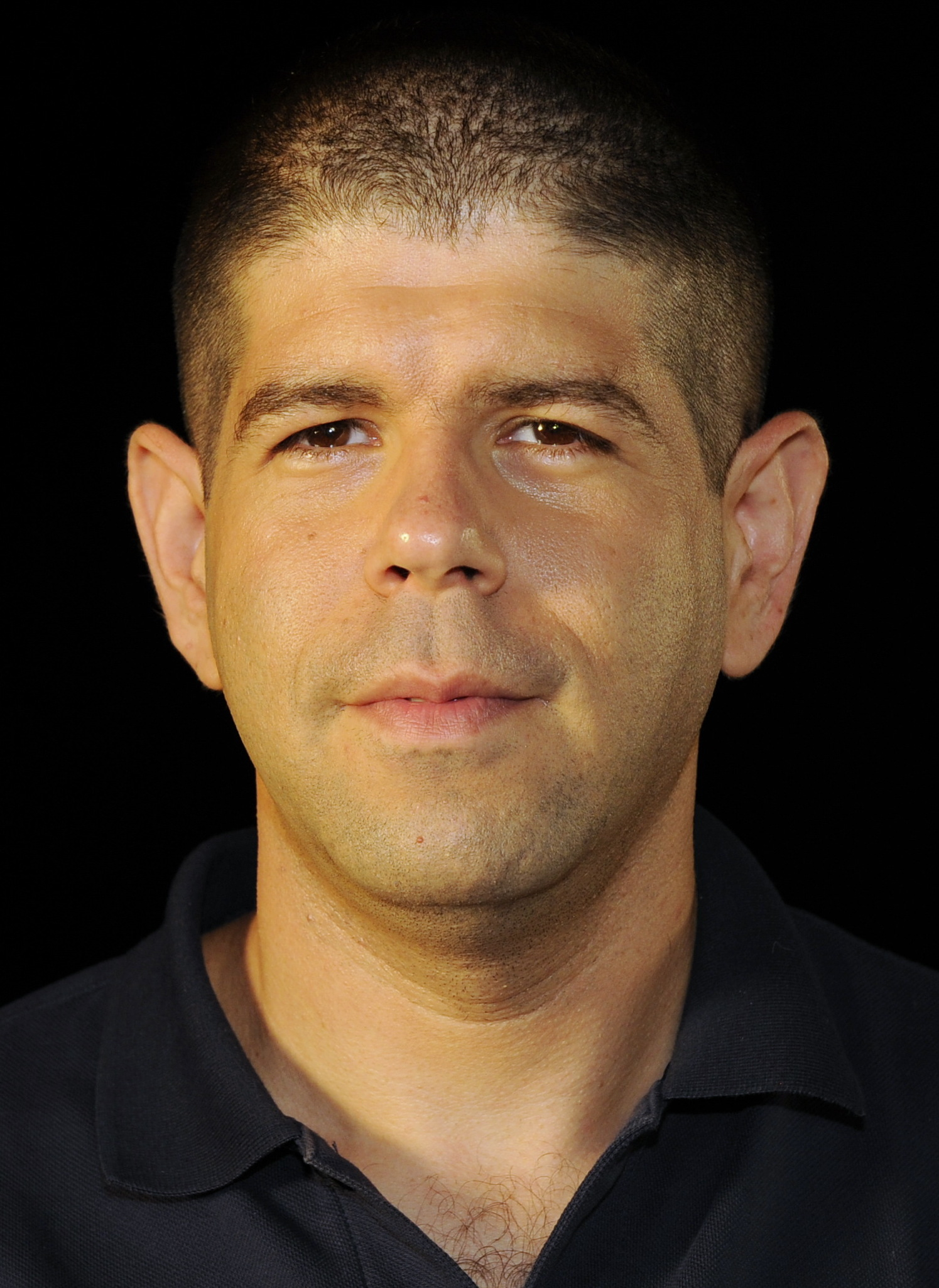
- Born: Yariv Oppenheimer; 5 December 1976 (age 49); Tel Aviv, Israel
- Occupations: Member of Peace Now leadership Publicist; TV & Radio Commentator
- Known for: Former Secretary General of Peace Now

Yariv Oppenheimer (Hebrew: יריב אופנהיימר) is an Israeli human rights activist and politician. He was the director of Peace Now for a year and a half until his resignation in April 2016, reportedly due to internal struggles.

== Early life ==
Oppenheimer was born on 5 December 1976 in Tel Aviv. His grandfather, Gershon Schatz (1905-1963) was one of the founding members of Betar and also a member of the National Workers' Union, Brit HaBirionim and Lehi. Oppenheimer grew up in Ramat Gan and graduated from Blich Municipal High School.

In 1995, he joined the IDF and served as a recruit commander and continued to serve in the reserves, including an operational deployment in the West Bank. He began his political career when he was 15, as an activist in the Labor Party's youth department during the elections for the Thirteenth Knesset.

After completing his military service, he returned to work as part of the Young Guard youth movement of the Israeli Labor Party and a few months later was appointed director of the youth wing of the party. In this capacity, he managed the youth activities during the election campaign of Ehud Barak. After four years, was appointed spokesperson for the Peace Now. And after a year and a half as speaker, he was appointed secretary-general of the movement. He resigned his post in April 2016.

Oppenheimer was married in November 2018 and his first child was born on 19 May 2019.

== Public activity ==
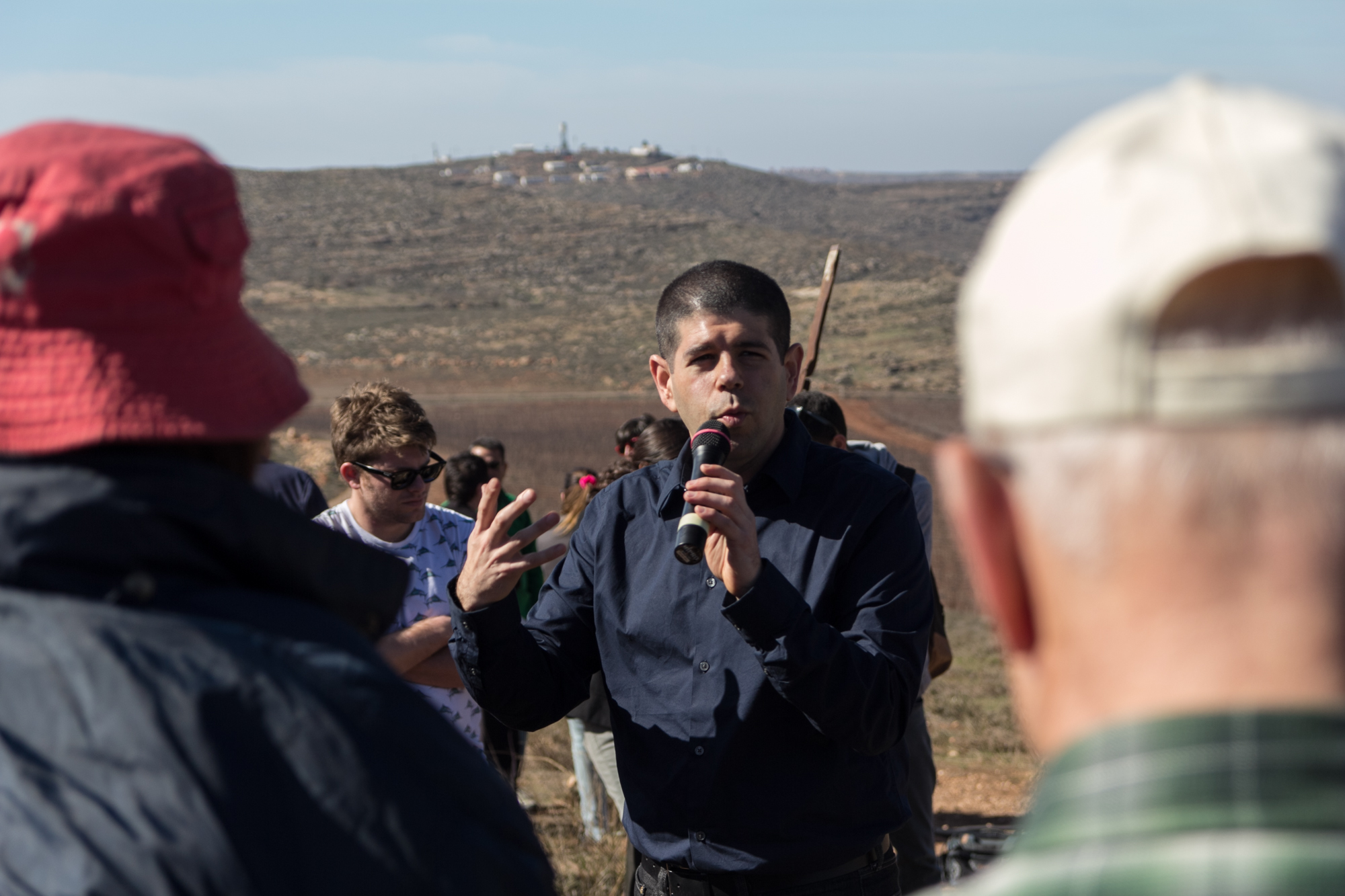
Oppenheimer speaking to participants on a hill overlooking the outposts of Esh Kodesh and Ahiya and the Palestinian villages of Jalud, Salfit and Duma.

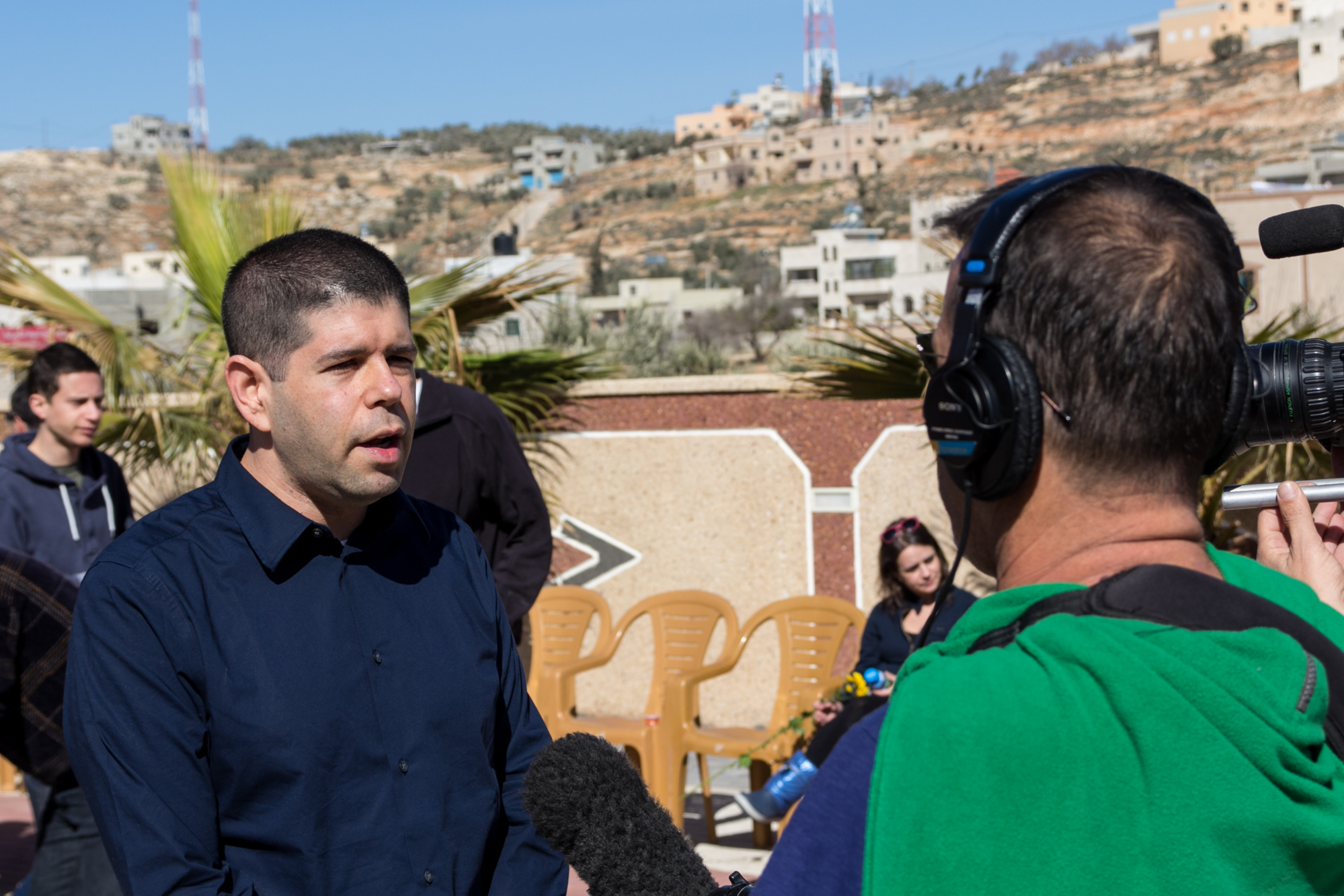
Oppenheimer interviewed by the media, during the Peace Now's Price Tag tour.

In the framework of his activities in Peace Now, Oppenheimer dealt with the struggle for an establishment of Palestinian state, the cessation of Israeli settlement construction and the evacuation of Israeli outposts. He wrote articles and op-eds in Maariv, Yedioth Ahronoth and Haaretz. He also appeared in dozens of events, public confrontations and media debates with right wing activists.

In the year preceding the Gaza disengagement plan, he was one of the initiators of demonstrations in favor of leaving the Gaza Strip. During his term as secretary-general of Peace Now, the movement has petitioned the Supreme Court of Israel demanding the evacuation of outposts and other illegal sites that were built in the Israeli-occupied territories. The legal activity led, among other things, to the evacuation of Migron outpost and buildings from the Amona outpost.

Oppenheimer frequently uses social media outlets such as Facebook and Twitter to promote public activism. He led a campaign to disqualify Im Tirtzu from participating in the "One Million Good Reasons" competition organized by Bank Leumi, on the grounds that the competition regulations would not allow the participation of associations and groups with political goals and agenda. Following the criticism from the left wing and right wing politicians, the Bank decided to cancel the competition.

Oppenheimer objected to several bills that tried to lead the coalition in the Eighteenth Knesset, including legislation limiting the sources of funding for Nonprofit organizations and the Regulation Law, designed to prevent the implementation of the Beit El evacuation.

In the election of the 2013 ellecion, Oppenheimer complained to the Central Elections Committee regarding The Jewish Home party using the images of IDF soldiers in uniform as part of its election campaign. Chairman of the Elections Committee, Justice Elyakim Rubinstein, accepted the petition and ruled that the use of the pictures actually contradicts the laws of the election campaign and therefore The Jewish Home party had to pay a fine of NIS 2,000 as state compensation and NIS 1,000 to Oppenheimer for expenses.

In addition to his activities in Peace Now, Oppenheimer was elected to the Labor Party convention. He ran for a slot on the party's Knesset list, once for the youth place and twice for the national primaries. In all cases, he was unable to enter a realistic place.

Oppenheimer sought a seat on the Labor list in the 2013 election. He received around 8,000 votes and was placed in the 27th place on the party list. After the retirement of Amir Peretz, who retired from the party on the morning of the day the lists were submitted, all the party candidates were "frozen" in one place and he was placed in the 26th place. Oppenheimer argued that the votes should be recalculated to take into account the reserved positions on the list, but his demand was not accepted.

In 2015, he announced his intention to step down as Peace Now director-general, but not from the movement's leadership. In April 2016, Avi Buskila was appointed secretary-general and Oppenheimer resigned from the position. But he remained a member of the board.

Oppenheimer ran for a spot on the Meretz list for the April 2019 and 2022 legislative elections. In 2022, he obtained 13th place on the Meretz list, and did not enter the Knesset.

=== Media career and later activities ===
Since stepping down as director of Peace Now, Oppenheimer has a regular presenter on DemocratTV.

In May 2024, a defamation lawsuit filed by settler Yeshoua Sherman against Oppenheimer, Zehava Galon, and B'Tselem was settled. The suit, which concerned a 2019 tweet regarding a shooting incident in the West Bank, ended with a compromise where the defendants were not required to pay financial damages, though B'Tselem agreed to clarify the wording of their original report.

=== Public image ===
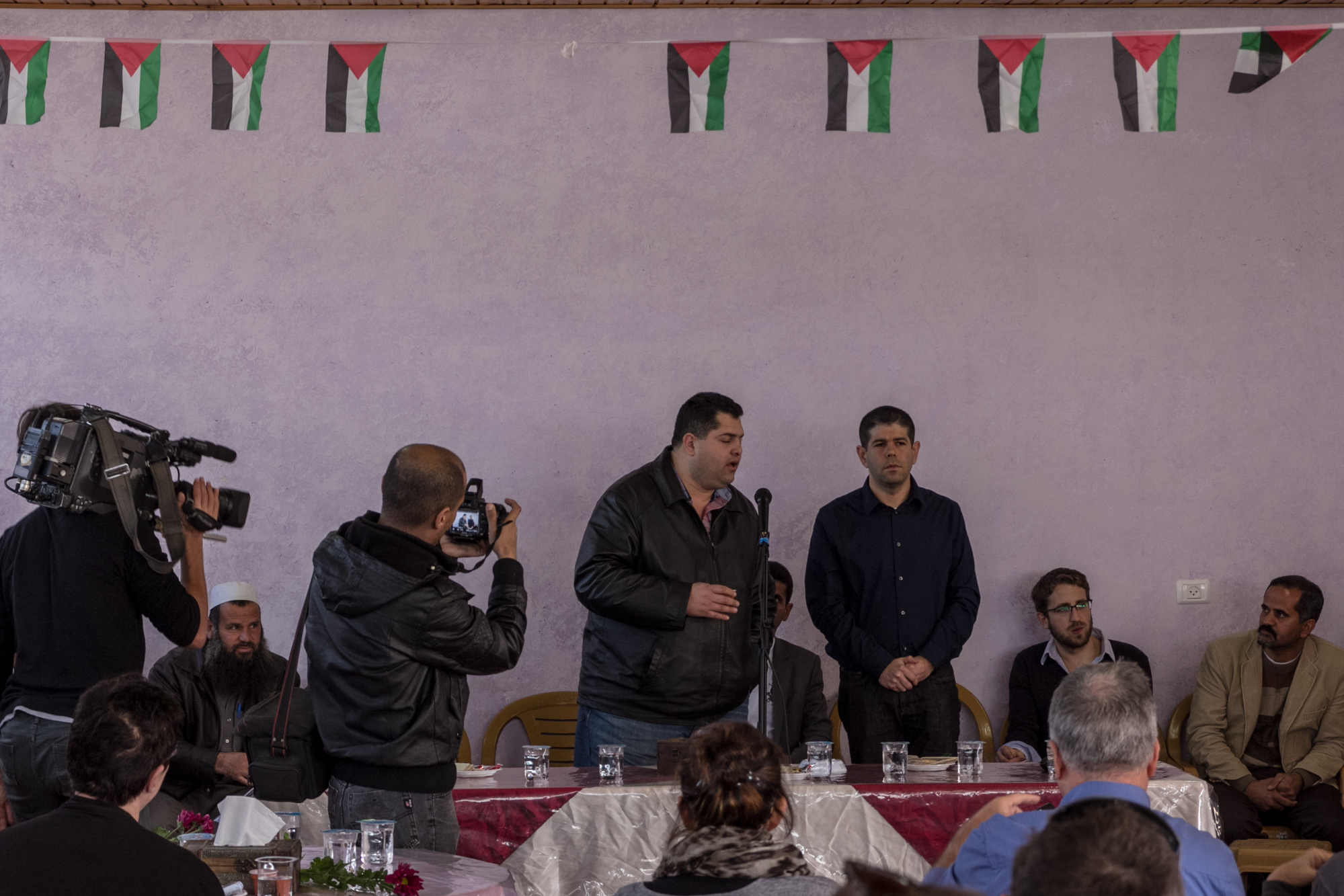
Oppenheimer with local dignitaries and activists at the reception in the Palestinian village of Qusra.

The political right in Israel frequently attacks Oppenheimer and the right-wing satirical site Latma portrayed him in its sketches as a satirical figure named "Yariv Googleheimer" played by actor Noam Jacobson, who represents Oppenheimer as a supporter of the boycott of Israel, and a collaborator with the Palestinians and anti-Israeli activists. In response to the sketches, Oppenheimer said that he is a victim of "character assassination".

Oppenheimer received threats to his life, and for a short time the Israel Police placed security near his home. In 2014, Oppenheimer signed a police complaint against right wing activist Baruch Marzel alleging threats against his life by his followers.

== Controversies ==
In 2009, he sent a photo crew to interview right-wing Knesset members, posing as students. Oppenheimer admitted that he was behind the act and that the Knesset officer filed a complaint against him against the police for impersonation. As a result, Oppenheimer was banned from entering the Knesset compound by then Speaker of the Knesset Reuven Rivlin. Oppenheimer announced that there had been a misunderstanding, and that Peace Now would not repeat such actions in the Knesset. As a result, Rivlin later renewed Oppenheimer's entry permit.

In 2011, Israeli newspaper Haaretz published an article "WikiLeaks exclusive", which revealed that Oppenheimer maintained contacts with the U.S. Embassy, where he gave them information about Israeli settlement construction in West Bank.

== See also ==
- Uri Avnery
- Yuval Neria
- Amos Oz
- Yuli Tamir
- David Zucker
