= Qaryut =

Palestinian village in Nablus, West Bank

Qaryout
- Municipality type D (Village council)

Arabic transcription(s)
  - Arabic: قريوت
  - Latin: Qaryout (official); Karyut, Kuriyet, Krayot (unofficial)
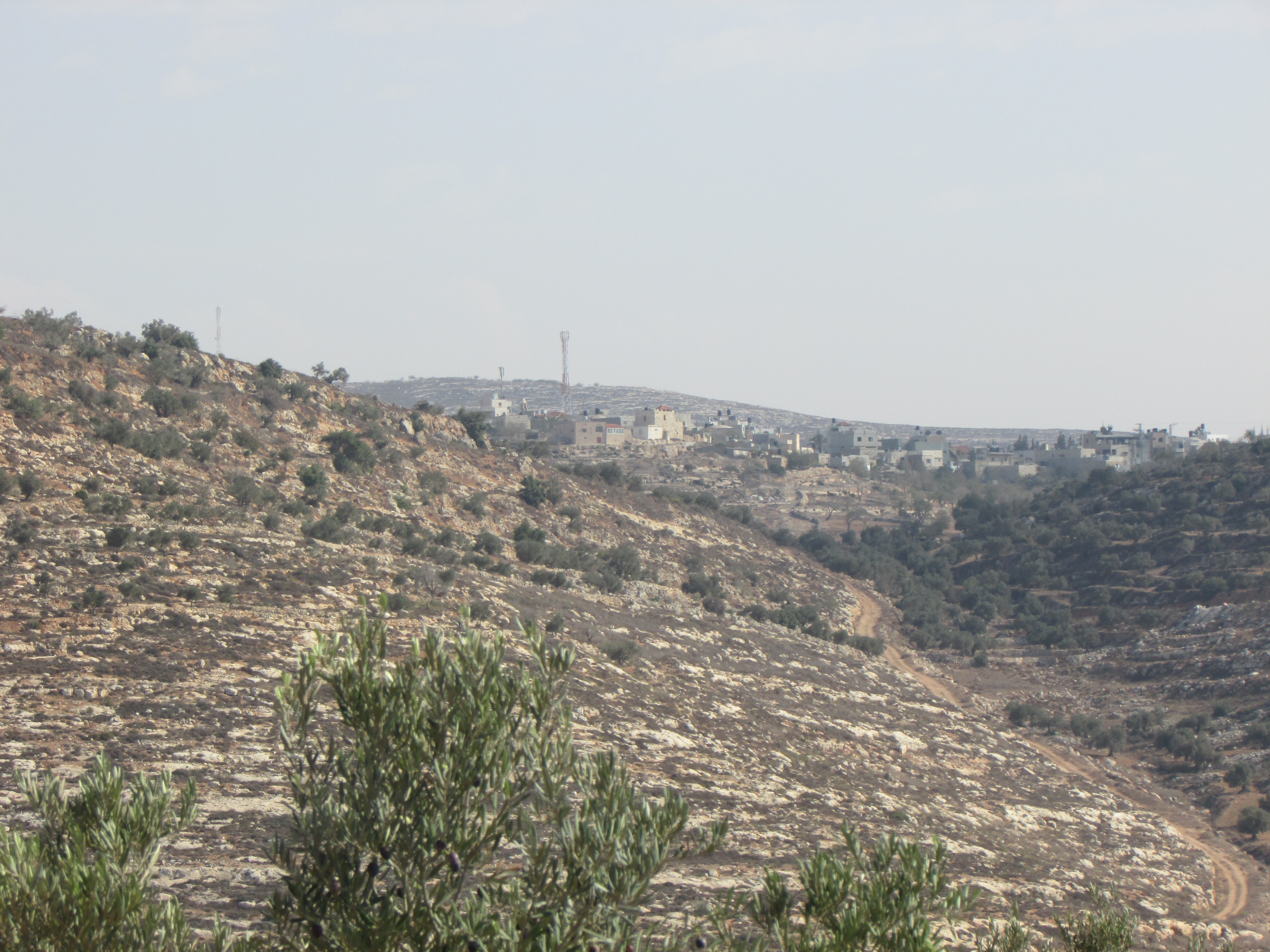
- Qaryout

- Location of Qaryout within Palestine
- Coordinates: 32°04′15″N 35°17′38″E
- Palestine grid: 178/164
- State: State of Palestine
- Governorate: Nablus

Government
  - Type: Village council

Population (2017)
  - Total: 2,560
- Name meaning: The towns

Qaryout (Arabic: قريوت) is a Palestinian village in the Nablus Governorate in the northern West Bank, located 28 kilometers (17 mi) southeast of Nablus.

According to the Palestinian Central Bureau of Statistics (PCBS), Qaryut had a population of 2,560 inhabitants in 2017.

== Location ==
Qaryut is located 17 km south of Nablus. It is bordered by Duma and Jalud to the east, Qusra and Talfit to the north, As Sawiya to the west, and Turmus'ayya to the south.

== History ==
Qaryut is an ancient village. Shards from the Iron Age II, Persian, Persian/Hellenistic, Roman, Byzantine Crusader/Ayyubid and Mamluk era have been found here.

Western travellers, like Edward Robinson, have suggested that Qaryut might be identical to ancient Coreae.

Röhricht suggested that Qaryut is identical with Kariateri, a place mentioned in Crusader texts.

It has been noted that: "This place, being at the head of Wady Fusail, seems to have given rise to the mediaeval identification of that valley as the Brook Cherith (mentioned by Marino Sanuto in 1321)."

=== Ottoman period ===
Potsherds from the early Ottoman era have been found here.

In 1838, Kuriyet was noted as being located in El-Beitawy district, east of Nablus.

In 1870, Victor Guérin noted: "This village is divided into two distinct districts, each under the jurisdiction of a particular Sheikh. Its population is seven hundred and fifty inhabitants. In the gardens around it grow fig trees, pomegranates and vines. Several old rock formations are currently dry, and women are forced to fetch water as far as Ain Siloun ['Seilun/Seiloun spring']. In two houses, I notice some blocks with boss cut." Guérin also identified Qaryut with ancient Coreae.

In 1882, the PEF's Survey of Western Palestine noted that Kuriyut was: "a small village, on the top of a high chain, with a spring between it and the ruin of Seilun (Shiloh)." The Arabic for "ruin of Seilun" is Khirbet Seilun.

The current residents of Qaryut trace their ancestry back to the Hejaz region of Saudi Arabia.

The Palestinian Rural History Project, records Khirbat Sara (خربة سارة) as a dependency of Qaryut, south of the village center.

=== British Mandate ===
In the 1922 census of Palestine, conducted by the British Mandate authorities, Qariut had a population of 530 Muslims, increasing in the 1931 census to 732; 3 Christians and 729 Muslims, in 156 houses.

In the 1945 statistics Qaryut had a population of 930, all Muslims, with 7,491 dunams of land, according to an official land and population survey. Of this, 2,611 dunams were plantations and irrigable land, 2,803 were used for cereals, while 63 dunams were built-up land.

=== Jordanian military period ===
In the wake of the 1948 Arab–Israeli War, and after the 1949 Armistice Agreements, Qaryut came under Jordanian rule.

The Jordanian census of 1961 found 1,163 inhabitants.

=== 1967, aftermath ===
Since the Six-Day War in 1967, Qaryut has been under Israeli occupation.

After the 1995 accords, 23% of village land is classified as Area B, the remaining 77% is Area C.

As of 2014, Israel has confiscated 2,221 dunams of Qaryat village land for 3 Israeli settlements: Eli, Shilo and Mizpe Rahel.

=== Israeli settler violence ===
In 2013, Israeli settlers from Eli have uprooted more than 100 olive trees belonging to Qaryut. In 2025, hundreds of olive trees were destroyed under a military security order.

On September 6, 2024, 13-year-old civilian girl, Bana Laboum, was killed by an Israeli sniper in her bedroom during a military raid which followed a settler attack on the village.

In October 2025, the Colonization and Wall Resistance Commission reported that Israeli authorities have issued a military order to seize 70 dunams of privately owned land from Qaryut, Al-Lubban Al-Sharqiya, and Al-Sawiya as a "buffer zone" for the nearby settlement of Eli.

On March 2, 2026, Mohammad Taha Maamar (52) and his brother Faheem (Fahim) Taha Maamar (48), unarmed Palestinian civilians, were shot and killed by Israeli settlers while attempting to prevent armed settlers from uprooting and damaging olive trees and other crops on their land. Following the assault, Israeli forces entered the village, detained residents, and used tear gas on villagers, including some who were already wounded.

According to the IDF Spokesperson, the killer has been identified as active reservist in the IDF, who had his weapon taken from him and a "criminal investigation" opened against him, despite no arrests having been made. According to +972 Magazine, the soldier involved belonged to a regional defense unit composed largely of settlers who patrol their own communities.

== Notable people ==
- Taysir Khalid (born 1941), Palestinian politician

== See also ==
- Olive cultivation in Palestine

== Bibliography ==
- Barron, J.B., ed. (1923). Palestine: Report and General Abstracts of the Census of 1922. Government of Palestine.
- Conder, C.R.; Kitchener, H.H. (1882). The Survey of Western Palestine: Memoirs of the Topography, Orography, Hydrography, and Archaeology. Vol. 2. London: Committee of the Palestine Exploration Fund.
- Finkelstein, I.; Lederman, Zvi, eds. (1997). Highlands of many cultures. Tel Aviv: Institute of Archaeology of Tel Aviv University Publications Section. ISBN 965-440-007-3.
- Government of Jordan, Department of Statistics (1964). First Census of Population and Housing. Volume I: Final Tables; General Characteristics of the Population (PDF).
- Government of Palestine, Department of Statistics (1945). Village Statistics, April, 1945.
- Guérin, V. (1875). Description Géographique Historique et Archéologique de la Palestine (in French). Vol. 2: Samarie, pt. 2. Paris: L'Imprimerie Nationale.
- Hadawi, S. (1970). Village Statistics of 1945: A Classification of Land and Area ownership in Palestine. Palestine Liberation Organization Research Center.
- Mills, E., ed. (1932). Census of Palestine 1931. Population of Villages, Towns and Administrative Areas. Jerusalem: Government of Palestine.
- Palmer, E.H. (1881). The Survey of Western Palestine: Arabic and English Name Lists Collected During the Survey by Lieutenants Conder and Kitchener, R. E. Transliterated and Explained by E.H. Palmer. Committee of the Palestine Exploration Fund.
- Ritter, C. (1886). The Comparative Geography of Palestine and the Sinaitic Peninsula. Vol. 2. T. & T. Clark.
- Robinson, E.; Smith, E. (1841). Biblical Researches in Palestine, Mount Sinai and Arabia Petraea: A Journal of Travels in the year 1838. Vol. 3. Boston: Crocker & Brewster.
- Röhricht, R. (1887). "Studien zur mittelalterlichen Geographie und Topographie Syriens". Zeitschrift des Deutschen Palästina-Vereins. 10: 195–344.
