= Amihai =

Israeli settlement in the West Bank

Amihai: עַמִּיחַי (Hebrew)

Hebrew transcription(s)
  - Unofficial: Amichai
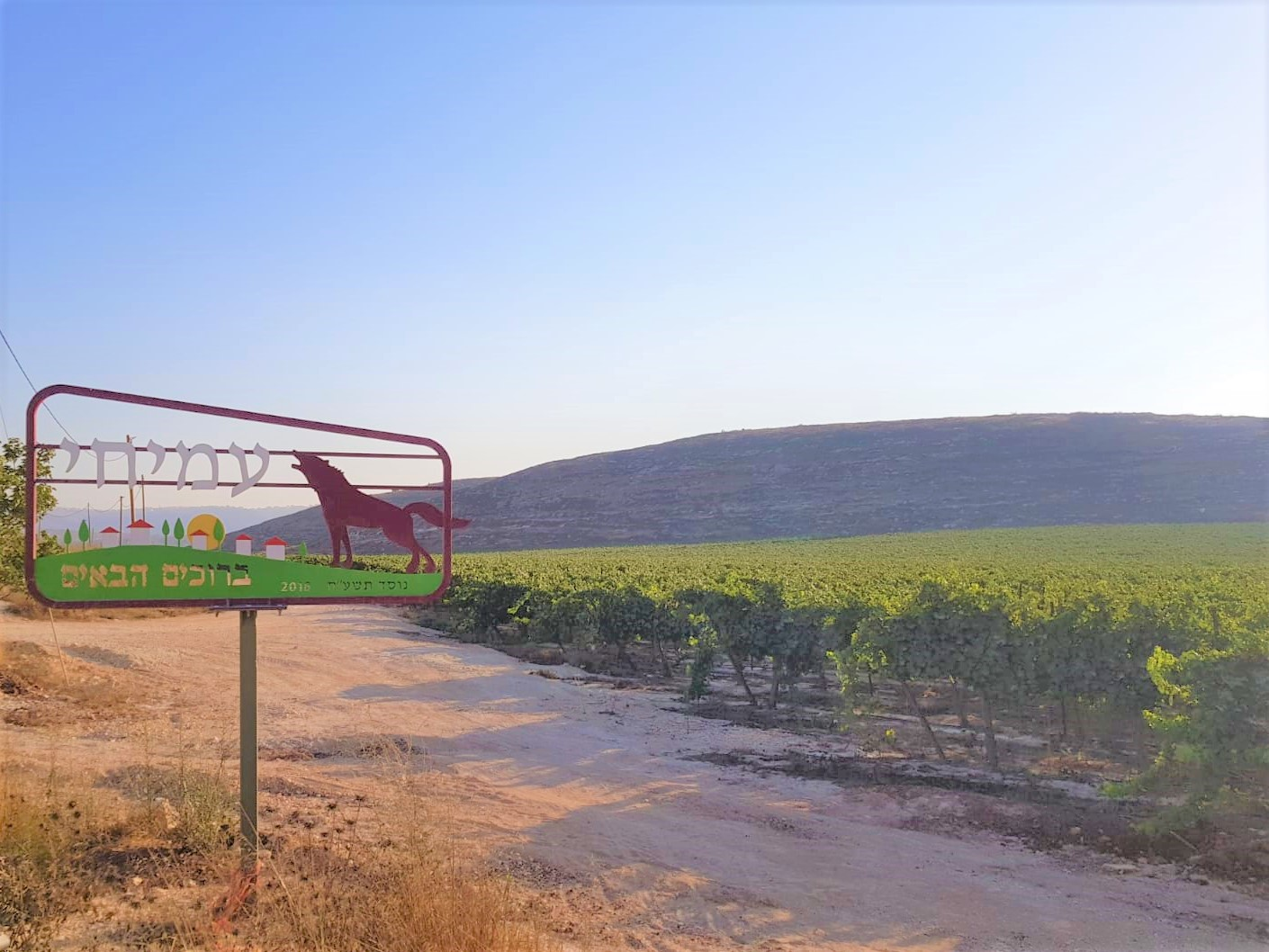

- Location within the Central West Bank Location within the West Bank
- Coordinates: 32°2′45″N 35°19′40″E
- Country: Palestine
- District: Judea and Samaria Area
- Council: Mateh Binyamin
- Region: West Bank
- Founded: 2018
- Founder: Evacuees from Amona
- Population (2024): 409

Amihai (Hebrew: עַמִּיחַי) is an Israeli settlement organized as a communal settlement in the Shilo settlement bloc in the West Bank. In 2024 it had a population of 409.

The international community considers all Israeli settlements in the West Bank illegal under international law, which the Israeli government disputes.

There is a plan to expand Amihai both west and east, and to include the outpost of Adei Ad (currently illegal even under Israeli law) in its jurisdiction, thereby legalizing the outpost. This is a highly controversial plan, which according to both critics and advocates, will result in the effective severance of West Bank's territorial contiguity, specifically between Central West Bank (Ramallah and Jerusalem) and Northern West Bank (Nablus, Jenin, etc.). This would have the effect of undermining the prospects of the realization of the Two-state solution.

== History ==
Amihai is one of the few Israeli settlements to be founded in the 21st century. Authorization for Amihai was given by the Israeli government as a result of a deal with residents of Amona, who were evacuated from their homes following a 2014 Israeli Supreme Court ruling. Amona's residents asked to be moved to a hill near the Geulat Zion outpost, east of Shilo.

Construction in Amihai began in June 2017. Temporary homes were installed in February 2018, and the first families moved in March 2018.
