= Jalud =

- Municipality type D (Village council)

Arabic transcription(s)
  - Arabic: جاﻟﻭﺩ
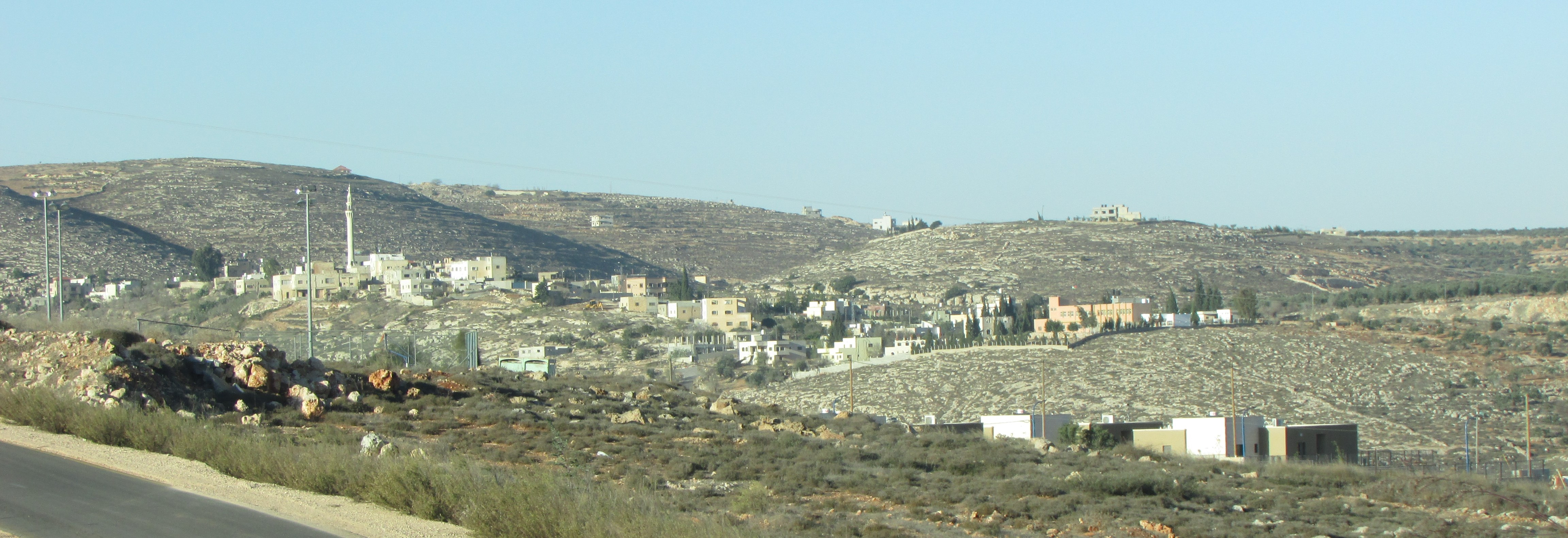
- Jalud

- Location of Jalud within the West Bank Location of Jalud within Palestine
- Coordinates: 32°4′11″N 35°18′57″E
- Palestine grid: 179/164
- State: State of Palestine
- Governorate: Nablus

Government
  - Type: Village council
  - Head of Municipality: Abdullah Tawfiq

Area
  - Total: 16.5 km^{2} (6.4 sq mi)

Population (2017)
  - Total: 743
  - Density: 45.0/km^{2} (117/sq mi)
- Name meaning: from personal name

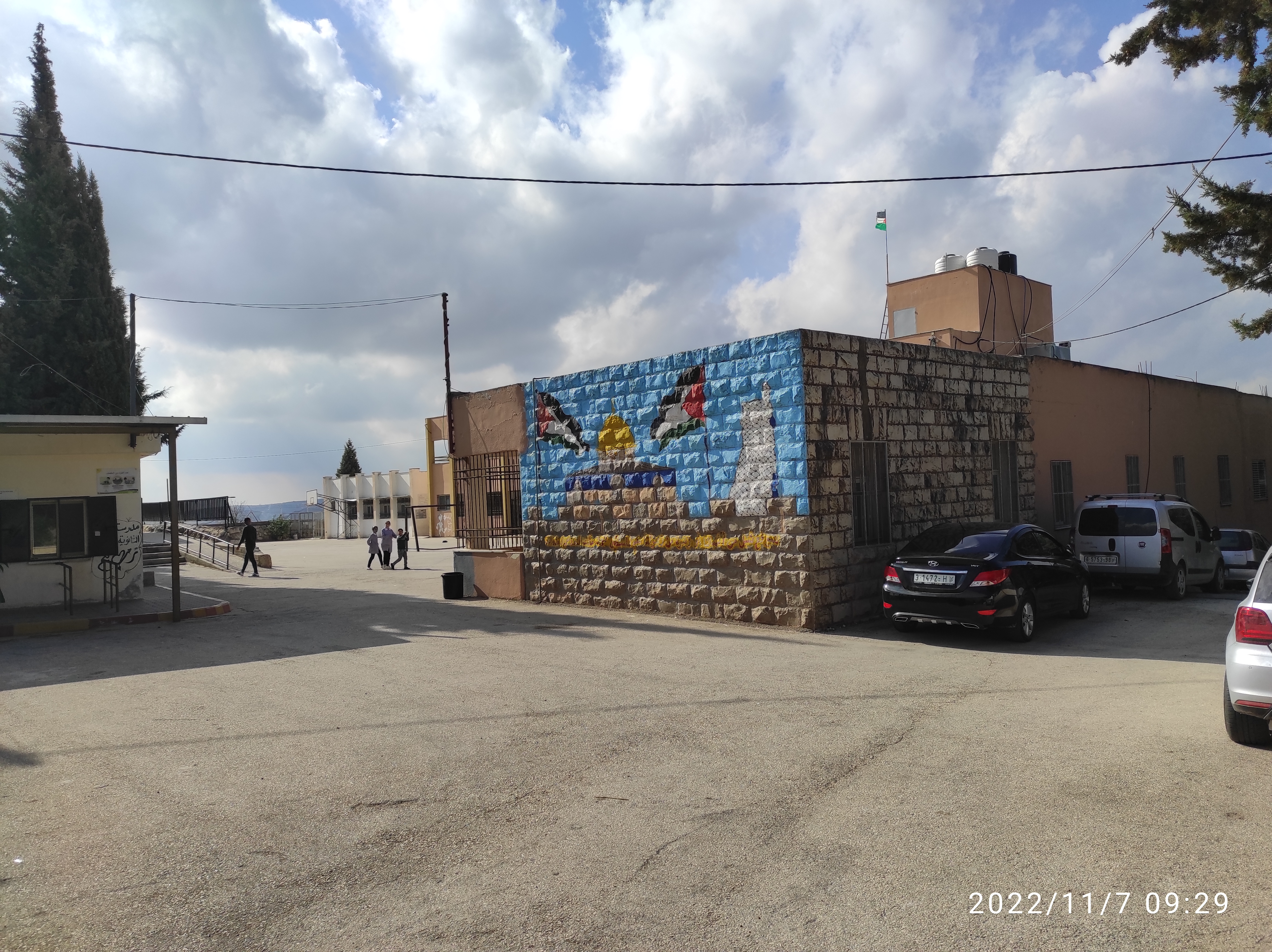
School in Jalud

Jalud (Arabic: جاﻟﻭﺩ) is a Palestinian village in the Nablus Governorate in the northern West Bank. It is approximately 30 kilometers (19 mi) south of Nablus and is situated just east of Qaryut, south of Qusra and northeast of Shilo, an Israeli settlement. Its land area consists of 16,517 dunams (16.517 square kilometers), 98 of which constitutes its built-up area. Jalud is encircled by four illegal outposts: Esh Kodesh, Adi Ad, Ahiya and Shvut Rachel. Jalud residents were blocked by both IDF forces and settlers from tending most of their farms from 2001 to 2007. In 2007 permission was given to farm their groves, twice a year for a few days, on condition that prior coordinating arrangements are made with the IDF.

== Location ==
Jalud is located 17 kilometers (11 mi) south of Nablus (distance from the center of the village to the city center of Nablus). It is bordered by Duma to the east, Qusra and Talfit to the north, As Sawiya and Qaryut to the west, and Turmus Ayya to the south.

== History ==
Potsherds from Iron Age II, Hellenistic, Byzantine, Umayyad, Crusader/Ayyubid and Mamluk eras have been found here.

Jalud is mentioned as "Galuda of Aqraba" in a Jewish marriage certificate of "Elijah, son of Simeon", which was discovered in a cave at Wadi Murabba'at and is dated to 123 CE. There's a possibility that merchants from this village had a court in Lod.

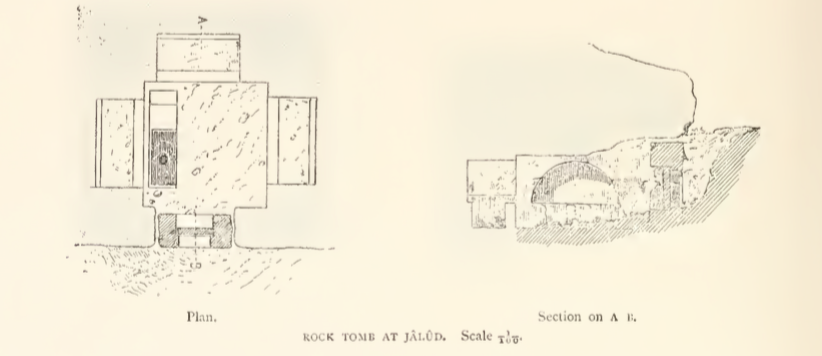
Graves, excavated by Clermont-Ganneau in the early 1870s

Clermont-Ganneau noted several rock-hewn tombs SSW of the village. One he excavated had three arcosolia, and a fully working stone door.

=== Ottoman era ===
In 1596, Jalud appeared in Ottoman tax registers as being a village in the nahiya of Jabal Qubal in the liwa of Nablus. It had a population of 20 households, all Muslim. They paid a fixed tax rate of 33.3% on agricultural products, including wheat, barley, summer crops, olive trees, goats and beehives; a total of 22,070 akçe. All of the revenues went to a waqf. Potsherds from the early Ottoman era have also been found here.

In 1838 Jalud was counted as a Muslim village in the subdistrict of el-Beitawi, east of Nablus.

In 1870 French explorer Victor Guérin visited the village, which he found to have about 300 inhabitants. In 1882, the PEF's Survey of Western Palestine, (SWP), described Jalud as "a small village on low ground, with olives to the south".

=== British Mandate era ===
In the 1922 census of Palestine conducted by the British Mandate authorities, Jalud had a population of 145 Muslims, increasing in the 1931 census to 225, still all Muslim, in 52 houses.

In the 1945 statistics the population had increased to 300 Muslims, while the total land area was 15,815 dunams, according to an official land and population survey. Of this, 457 dunams were allocated for plantations and irrigable land, 6,838 for cereals, while 24 dunams were classified as built-up (urban) areas.

=== Jordanian era ===
In the wake of the 1948 Arab–Israeli War, and after the 1949 Armistice Agreements, Jalud came under Jordanian rule. It was annexed by Jordan in 1950.

The Jordanian census of 1961 found 290 inhabitants.

=== Post-1967 ===
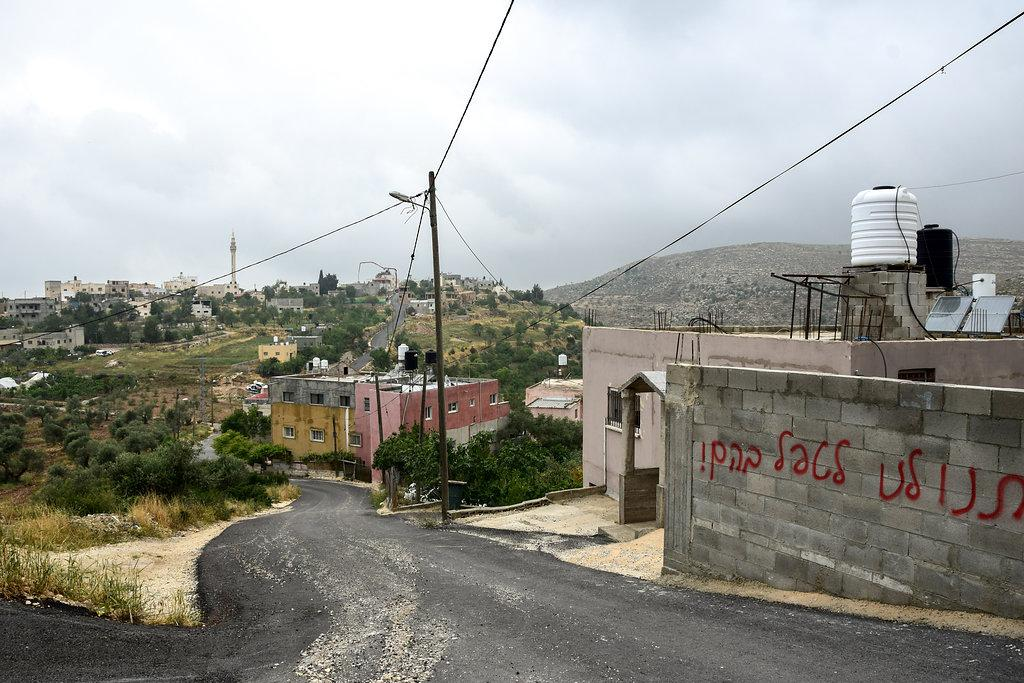
"Let us handle them." Graffiti spray-painted in Hebrew by Israeli settlers on the wall of a home in Jalud, 2018

Since the Six-Day War in 1967, Jalud has been under Israeli occupation.

In 2017, Jalud's population was 743 according to the Palestinian Central Bureau of Statistics (PCBS). There were 91 non-residential buildings, 94 houses and five business establishments in the village. The average household size was 5.5 persons. According to Jalud's mayor, the village experiences high unemployment and migration due to land confiscation by Israel and sporadic violence from nearby Israeli settlements, which for 10 years has impeded villagers' access to their groves.

=== Israeli settler violence ===
- On 9 February 2011, Israeli settlers from Ahiya, a nearby settlement outpost, attacked Jalud, demanding residents evacuate their houses. Israeli police arrived following clashes between the settlers and Palestinian residents, dispersing the former using tear gas and stun grenades.
- On 21 October 2011, while international activists and Combatants for Peace assisted the Jalud villagers in reclaiming their harvests, a group of 4 armed and masked men from Esh Kodesh, a satellite outpost, confronted them yelling that they must get off what the group asserted was outpost land. They then threw a stun grenade and fired in the direction of the harvesters, some of whom were then clubbed. According to the testimony of Israeli eyewitnesses, the IDF and Border Police present did not intervene, other than to fire more tear gas grenades at the harvesters and wounded. A formal complaint was laid. Follow-up checks by the Israeli NGO Yesh Din over several months indicate that a police investigation is "ongoing".
- On 9 October 2013, Israeli arsonists, apparently from the nearby outposts, intruded into the Jalud elementary school, hurled rocks and damaged 5 cars belonging to the teaching body. They then set fire to the village's olive groves, damaging some 400 trees. A settler website vindicated the attack as a reprisal for the dismantlement of another illegal outpost, Givat Geulat Zion, carried out by the IDF that morning. Three youths from Adi Ad were subsequently arrested on suspicion of involvement, but local Palestinian eyewitnesses have stated that the assailants, some 20, did not appear to be minors.
- In 2017, Fawzi Ibrahim reported waited two months for getting access to his lands, and then having only 2 days to plow and plant. Muhammad Muqbil reported that he had olive trees stolen by settlers, and needed help from Rabbis for Human Rights to get access to his lands.
- In April 2022, Haaretz reported that Jewish settlers from the nearby illegal outposts that encircle the town promoted attacks with firebombs in Jalud, torching cars and house yards, in what the Israeli newspaper classified as a "pogrom" and "settler terror".
- On 9 January 2026, Israeli settlers from the Ahiya and Esh Kodesh outposts cut through the fence and entered Jalud’s secondary mixed school, which serves about 210 students. During the incident, settlers threw flammable materials into a classroom and spray-painted slogans on the walls.

Israeli settlers arson on Jalud March 2026

- On 22 March 2026, the village was attacked by a group of settlers who beat and injured several residents and set fire to cars and buildings.
- More than 50 settlers besieged and ultimately displaced the Tubasi family from their houses in late July 2026.
- The family attempted to return in September with protection from the Israel Border Police, but were attacked by more than 100 settlers. Three members of the border police were injured, two settlers were arrested there and a third was arrested later. 12 members of the Border Police were available for backup, with the IDF reportedly not coordinating the attempted move with either the Shin Bet or police.

== Olive groves ==
In her 2009 publication entitled Tree Flags, legal scholar and ethnographer Irus Braverman describes how Palestinians identify olive groves as "their symbol of their longtime agricultural connection to the land."

== Bibliography ==
- Barron, J.B., ed. (1923). Palestine: Report and General Abstracts of the Census of 1922. Government of Palestine.
- Clermont-Ganneau, C.S. (1896). [ARP] Archaeological Researches in Palestine 1873-1874, translated from the French by J. McFarlane. Vol. 2. London: Palestine Exploration Fund.
- Conder, C.R.; Kitchener, H.H. (1882). The Survey of Western Palestine: Memoirs of the Topography, Orography, Hydrography, and Archaeology. Vol. 2. London: Committee of the Palestine Exploration Fund.
- Finkelstein, I.; Lederman, Zvi, eds. (1997). Highlands of many cultures. Tel Aviv: Institute of Archaeology of Tel Aviv University Publications Section. ISBN 965-440-007-3.
- Government of Jordan, Department of Statistics (1964). First Census of Population and Housing. Volume I: Final Tables; General Characteristics of the Population (PDF).
- Government of Palestine, Department of Statistics (1945). Village Statistics, April, 1945.
- Guérin, V. (1875). Description Géographique Historique et Archéologique de la Palestine (in French). Vol. 2: Samarie, pt. 2. Paris: L'Imprimerie Nationale.
- Hadawi, S. (1970). Village Statistics of 1945: A Classification of Land and Area ownership in Palestine. Palestine Liberation Organization Research Center.
- Hütteroth, W.-D.; Abdulfattah, K. (1977). Historical Geography of Palestine, Transjordan and Southern Syria in the Late 16th Century. Erlanger Geographische Arbeiten, Sonderband 5. Erlangen, Germany: Vorstand der Fränkischen Geographischen Gesellschaft. ISBN 3-920405-41-2.
- Mills, E., ed. (1932). Census of Palestine 1931. Population of Villages, Towns and Administrative Areas. Jerusalem: Government of Palestine.
- Palmer, E.H. (1881). The Survey of Western Palestine: Arabic and English Name Lists Collected During the Survey by Lieutenants Conder and Kitchener, R. E. Transliterated and Explained by E.H. Palmer. Committee of the Palestine Exploration Fund.
- Robinson, E.; Smith, E. (1841). Biblical Researches in Palestine, Mount Sinai and Arabia Petraea: A Journal of Travels in the year 1838. Vol. 3. Boston: Crocker & Brewster.
