= Talfit =

Talfit تلفيت
- Municipality type D (Village council)
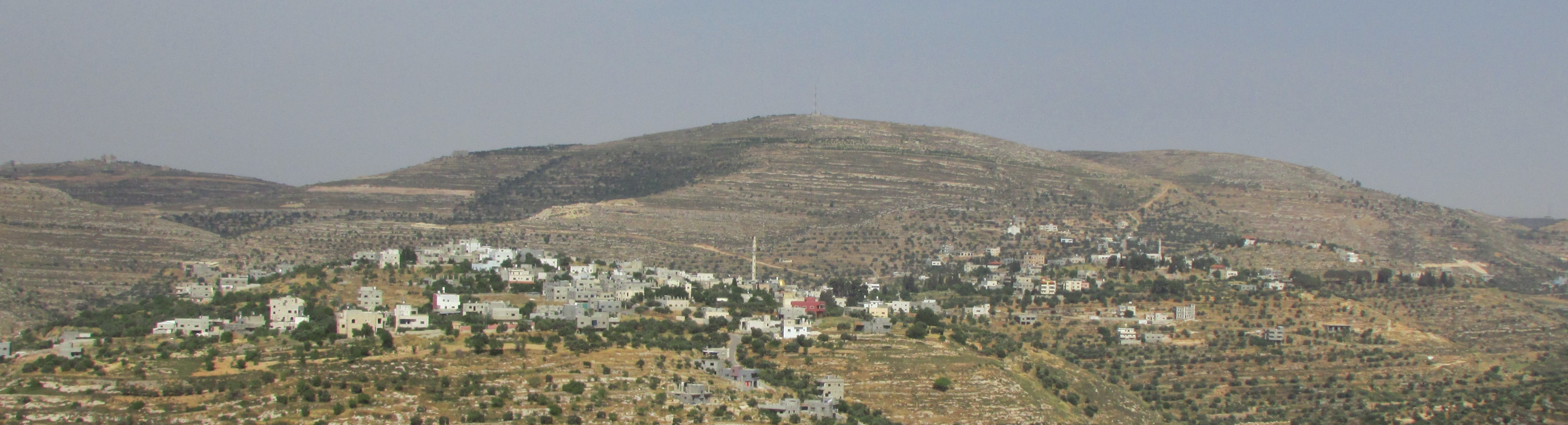
- Talfit from the west

- Location of Talfit within Palestine
- Coordinates: 32°05′19″N 35°17′29″E
- Palestine grid: 177/165
- State: State of Palestine
- Governorate: Nablus

Government
  - Type: Village council
  - Head of Municipality: Raed Ershed

Population (2017)
  - Total: 3,591

Talfit (Arabic: تلفيت), also pronounced Tilfit, is a Palestinian village in the Nablus Governorate in the northern West Bank, located southeast of Nablus. According to the Palestinian Central Bureau of Statistics (PCBS) census, it had a population of 3,591 in 2017.

== Location ==
Talfit is located 15.1 kilometres (9 mi) south Nablus. It is bordered by Jalud and Qusra to the east, Jurish and Qabalan to the north, Eli, Mateh Binyamin to the west, and Qaryut to the south.

== History ==
Potsherds from the Iron Age II, Persian and Byzantine/Ayyubid eras have been found.

Röhricht suggested identifying Talfit with Tarphin, mentioned in a Crusader text from 1154, but a later author (Abel) located it at Kh. Tarfein to the north of Bir Zeit. According to Finkelstein, Kh. Tarfein better fits the archaeological finds.

Potsherds from the Mamluk era has also been found.

=== Ottoman era ===
In 1596, Talfit appeared in Ottoman tax registers as a village in the Nahiya of Jabal Qubal in the Liwa of Nablus. It had a population of 12 Muslim households. The villagers paid a fixed tax-rate of 33,3% on wheat, barley, summer crops, olives, and goats or beehives; a total of 1,500 akçe. Potsherds from the early Ottoman era has also been found here.

In 1838 Edward Robinson noted Telfit located in El-Beitawy district, east of Nablus.

The PEF's Survey of Western Palestine noted in 1882 that the place resembled Kabalan, the latter being described as a village of moderate size, on high ground, surrounded by olive trees. Talfit was supplied with water from a well called 'Ain Telfit.

=== British Mandate era ===
In the 1922 census of Palestine, conducted by the British Mandate authorities, Talfit had a population of 352, all Muslims, increasing in the 1931 census to 464, still all Muslim, in 116 occupied houses.

In the 1945 statistics, Telfit had a population of 610 Muslims, with 6,258 dunams of land, according to an official land and population survey. Of this, 3,309 dunams were plantations and irrigable land, 1,228 used for cereals, while 49 dunams were built-up land.

=== Jordanian era ===
In the wake of the 1948 Arab–Israeli War, and after the 1949 Armistice Agreements, Talfit came under Jordanian rule.

The Jordanian census of 1961 found 904 inhabitants.

=== 1967-present ===
After the Six-Day War in 1967, Talfit has been under Israeli occupation.

After the 1995 accords, 97% of the village land is classified as Area B land, while the remaining 3% is Area C.

== Demography ==
=== Local origins ===
Locals trace their origins to the area of Damascus, in Syria.

== Bibliography ==
- Barron, J.B., ed. (1923). Palestine: Report and General Abstracts of the Census of 1922. Government of Palestine.
- Conder, C.R.; Kitchener, H.H. (1882). The Survey of Western Palestine: Memoirs of the Topography, Orography, Hydrography, and Archaeology. Vol. 2. London: Committee of the Palestine Exploration Fund.
- Finkelstein, I.; Lederman, Zvi, eds. (1997). Highlands of many cultures. Tel Aviv: Institute of Archaeology of Tel Aviv University Publications Section. ISBN 965-440-007-3.
- Government of Jordan, Department of Statistics (1964). First Census of Population and Housing. Volume I: Final Tables; General Characteristics of the Population (PDF).
- Government of Palestine, Department of Statistics (1945). Village Statistics, April, 1945.
- Hadawi, S. (1970). Village Statistics of 1945: A Classification of Land and Area ownership in Palestine. Palestine Liberation Organization Research Center.
- Hütteroth, W.-D.; Abdulfattah, K. (1977). Historical Geography of Palestine, Transjordan and Southern Syria in the Late 16th Century. Erlanger Geographische Arbeiten, Sonderband 5. Erlangen, Germany: Vorstand der Fränkischen Geographischen Gesellschaft. ISBN 3-920405-41-2.
- Mills, E., ed. (1932). Census of Palestine 1931. Population of Villages, Towns and Administrative Areas. Jerusalem: Government of Palestine.
- Palmer, E.H. (1881). The Survey of Western Palestine: Arabic and English Name Lists Collected During the Survey by Lieutenants Conder and Kitchener, R. E. Transliterated and Explained by E.H. Palmer. Committee of the Palestine Exploration Fund.
- Robinson, E.; Smith, E. (1841). Biblical Researches in Palestine, Mount Sinai and Arabia Petraea: A Journal of Travels in the year 1838. Vol. 3. Boston: Crocker & Brewster.
- Röhricht, R. (1887). "Studien zur mittelalterlichen Geographie und Topographie Syriens". Zeitschrift des Deutschen Palästina-Vereins. 10: 195–344.
