= Yaakov Teitel =

American–Israeli murder convict (born 1972)

- יעקב טייטל
- Born: November 1972 (age 53); Florida, United States
- Convictions: Murder (2 counts); Attempted murder (2 counts)
- Penalty: Life imprisonment

Details
- Country: Israel

Yaakov Teitel (Hebrew: יעקב טייטל; born November 1972) is an American-born Israeli Jewish terrorist, convicted for killing two people in 2009. Teitel, who had immigrated to Israel in 2000, settling in a West Bank settlement, confessed to planning and committing various acts of terrorism and hate crimes against Palestinians, homosexuals, left-wingers, missionary Christians, and police officers across Israel. Teitel was sentenced to life imprisonment, which he is currently serving.

== Early life ==
Yaakov Teitel was born in 1972 in Florida, United States, and moved to Norfolk, Virginia, when he was a teenager. His father, Mark, was a retired dentist who had served in the U.S. Navy during the Vietnam War, and his mother, Dianne, was a medical secretary – both of whom became Haredi Jews later in life. Commonly known as Jack, Teitel attended university and received a bachelor's degree in psychology, and in the mid-1990s, he began making regular visits to Israel. He was arrested in August 1997 on suspicion of murdering a Palestinian shepherd, but was released, and the case was eventually closed due to lack of evidence. Teitel subsequently returned to the United States, where he took a computer course with Microsoft, and began working as a computer technician.

== Emigration to Israel ==
In 1999, Teitel immigrated to Israel and moved to the settlement of Shvut Rachel, becoming an Israeli citizen under the Law of Return in December 2000. The following year, his parents and sister also emigrated to Israel, and settled in Beitar Illit, an Ultra-Orthodox city in the Gush Etzion settlement bloc. In 2002, Teitel met Rivka Pepperman, a British-born dance teacher originally from Broughton Park, Manchester, whose family had moved to Israel in 1981. They married the following year, and had four children. Teitel was summoned by Israel Defense Forces for preliminary checks, but was exempted from conscription due to his advanced age, medical history, and familial state.

Teitel was considered an outcast in the settlement due to his limited proficiency in Hebrew and reclusive behavior. He hardly left his home, and did not regularly participate in services at the local synagogue.

== Terrorist acts and arrest ==
Teitel was arrested in Jerusalem's Har Nof neighborhood on October 7, 2009, while posting flyers praising the 2009 Tel Aviv gay centre shooting. He attempted to throw away a bag he was carrying, but it was retrieved, and was found to contain two handguns. Teitel was then turned over to Shin Bet for interrogation, while special police units raided his home and the homes of his brother-in-law, parents, and mother-in-law. The search of his property revealed a cache of guns, parts used in explosive devices, pellets used to maximize the impact of explosives, binoculars, and flyers containing anti-gay incitement. The explosives were all detonated safely by the police, and a search of his home two days later found a bomb buried in the backyard.

Israeli police revealed that Teitel, acting alone, confessed to a string of terrorist attacks and attempted attacks. Teitel confessed to having carried out a pipe-bomb attack against Ze'ev Sternhell, as well as the murders of a Palestinian taxi driver and a West Bank shepherd in 1997, a 2006 attempted bombing near the settlement of Eli, three bombings against police targets and a Christian monastery in 2007, and sending a booby-trapped package that injured a teenage boy to the home of a Messianic Jewish family in Ariel. In addition to Teitel's confession, his DNA was found to match DNA retrieved from Sternhell's home after the bombing attack. Teitel also confessed that he had planned to fly a remote-controlled toy plane containing explosives into the Tel Aviv gay pride parade, and that he planned a bombing against a Jerusalem gay bar. He also admitted that he planned to fire an improvised mortar against the Al-Aqsa Mosque, but abandoned the plan over fear of injuring Jewish worshippers on the Temple Mount.

Teitel was also suspected of murdering two police officers in the Jordan Valley, and confessed to the gay centre shooting in Tel Aviv in 2009, though police stated that they were certain he was not involved in either. Following the discoveries, Teitel was held by Shin Bet in special custody for 48 hours, without being allowed to see an attorney or brought before a judge. The Petah Tikva District Court denied appeals from his attorney to meet with him, and subsequently extended both his remand and the special ordnance banning him from meeting his lawyer. All of Teitel's arraignments were held behind closed doors, and a gag order was imposed on the case.

On 10 November 2009, the Jerusalem District Prosecutor's Office declared that Teitel would be charged for the murder of the two Palestinians, incitement to racism, deploying explosive devices, and sabotage. Teitel's legal defense was provided by Honenu, an organization which provides legal defense for Israelis accused of crimes against Arabs or the Israeli security forces. Honenu founder Shmuel Meidad suggested that Teitel may be mentally unstable, stating that, "It's my impression that this man is sick, but he's not nearly as sick as the state." On 4 May 2010, Jerusalem's district psychiatrist ruled Teitel unfit to stand trial. The evaluation was criticized by Israeli-Arab Knesset members, with Ahmad Tibi stating, "An Arab who shoots a Jew in Israel is a terrorist, but a Jew who shoots Arabs is insane." Following a new psychiatric evaluation, the district court overturned the previous ruling, and declared Teitel fit for trial, on 30 August.

== Conviction ==
In February 2012, the Jerusalem District Prosecutor's Office and Teitel's attorneys agreed to a plea bargain under which he would confess to two counts of murder. Teitel's attorneys confessed on his behalf, as Teitel himself announced that he did not recognize the court's jurisdiction. After the indictment, the defense and prosecution would argue over whether Teitel was aware of his actions and was fit for trial, and the court would deliberate over whether Teitel is accountable for his actions. In January 2013, Teitel was convicted on two counts of murder and two counts of attempted murder, with the court rejecting the defense's arguments that he was legally insane. In April, he was sentenced to two life sentences and 30 years for the murder of two Palestinians, the attempted murder of two others, and other offenses, and ordered to pay mandatory compensation of NIS 650,000 to the families of the victims.
