= Shvut Rachel =

Coordinates: 32°3′16″N 35°18′42″E

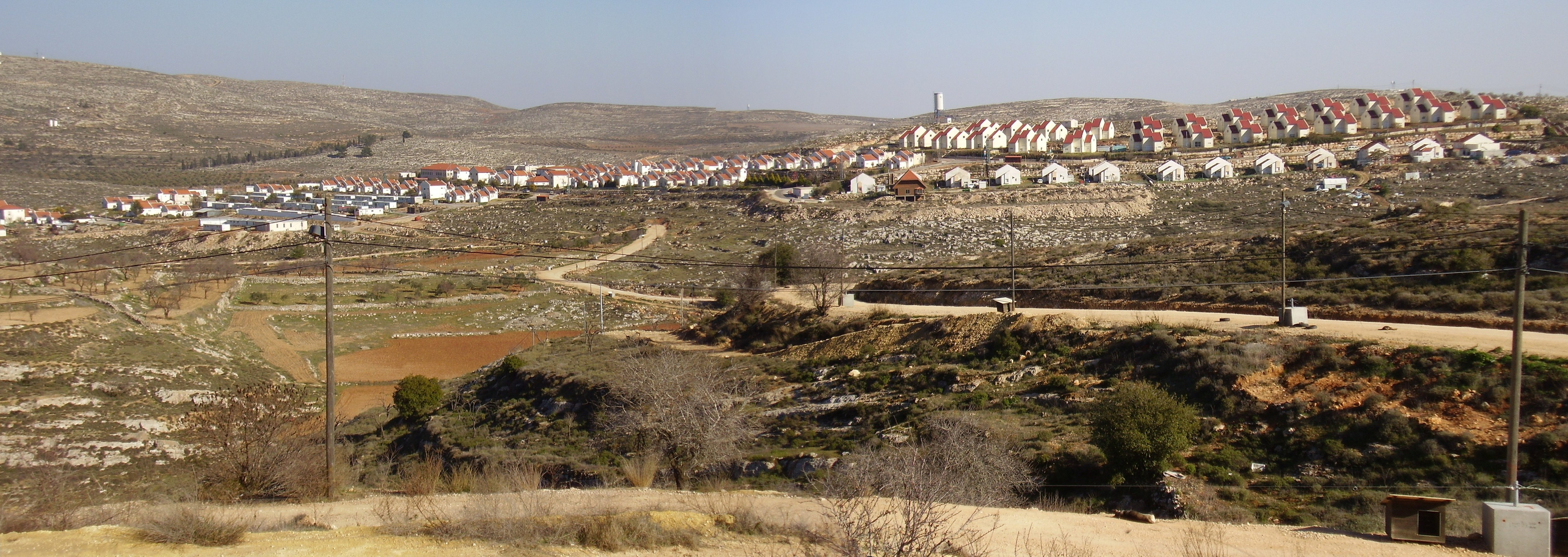
Panorama of Shvut Rachel as seen from Shilo

Shvut Rachel (Hebrew: שבות רחל) is an Israeli settlement in the West Bank, formerly an outpost, which was retroactively designated a neighborhood of the settlement of Shilo, and legalized in 2025. Shvut Rachel sits between the Palestinian villages of Turmus Ayya, Qaryut and Jalud, part of whose lands were expropriated for building Shvut Rachel. Nearby Israeli settlements include Shilo, Giv'at Har'el, Esh Kodesh, Keeda, and Adei Ad. The village, administered by the Matte Binyamin Regional Council, has a population of 100 families. The Sasson Report in 2005 noted that the settlement extends over Palestinian land, part of which is owned by Fawzi Haj Ibrahim Mohammad from Jalud, turned over to the settlement after the Israeli authorities declared it state land.

The international community considers Israeli settlements in the West Bank illegal under international law, but the Israeli government disputes this.

== History ==
According to ARIJ, Israel confiscated land from two Palestinian villages for the establishment of Shvut Rachel: 372 dunams (37.2 hectares) of land from Turmus Ayya, and 963 dunams (96.3 hectares) from Qaryut/Jalud.

The village was founded in November 1991 in memory of the victims of a terrorist attack on a civilian bus; Rachela Druk of Shilo, a mother of 7, and Yitzhak Rofe, the bus driver – who were on their way to a demonstration in Tel Aviv. On the night of the funerals, a group of students from the yeshiva in Shilo as well as two young couples, including a pregnant woman who gave birth a week later, established Shvut Rachel. The settlers moved on to the land without government permission.

In February 2012 the Israeli government approved the construction of new housing units in Shvut Rachel. This action was condemned by the High Representative of the Union for Foreign Affairs and Security Policy of the European Union, Catherine Ashton.

== Legal status ==
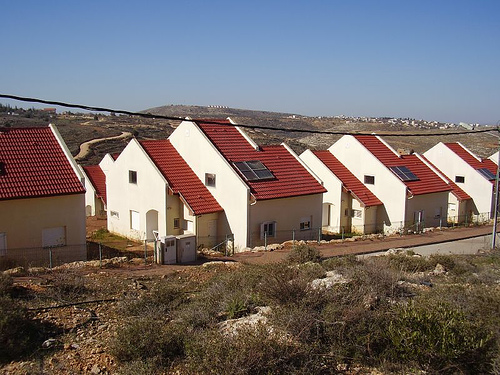
Homes in Shvut Rachel

The international community considers Israeli settlements in the West Bank illegal under international law. Israel, on the other hand, differentiates between "legal" and "illegal" settlements, and Shvut Rachel was illegal even by Israeli standards until February 2012. According to Peace Now, the Coordinator of Government Activities in the Territories legalized the outpost by redesignating it as a neighborhood of Shilo. On March 22, 2025, the Israeli government legalized Shvut Rachel as a separate settlement.

== Midreshet Binat ==
Binat is a midrasha located in Shvut Rachel. Headed by Rabbi Ronen Tamir, it was founded in 2000 as an additional branch of the nearby yeshiva in Shilo. It includes a regular seminary program, a one-month program in September for college students, and a joint program with Bayit VeGan Teachers College. It is associated with the Talpiot College of Education.

== See also ==
- Jack Teitel
