= Esh Kodesh =

Israeli settlement in the West Bank

Esh Kodesh: אֵשׁ קֹדֶשׁ, אש קודש (Hebrew)
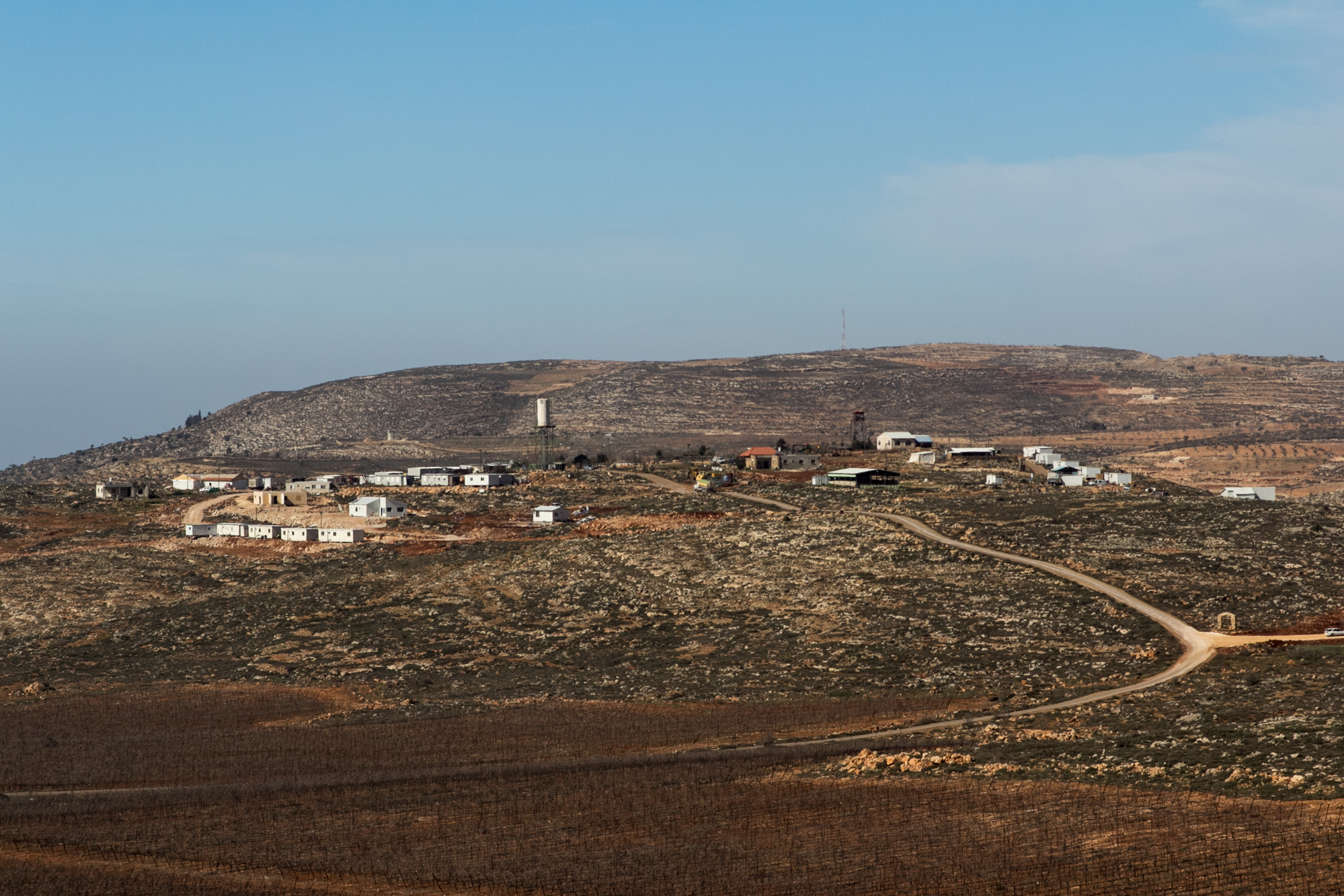

- Location within the Northern West Bank Location within the West Bank
- Coordinates: 32°4′1″N 35°20′10″E
- Country: Israel
- District: Judea and Samaria Area
- Council: Mateh Binyamin
- Region: West Bank
- Founded: 2000

Esh Kodesh (Hebrew: אֵשׁ קֹדֶשׁ, lit. 'Sacred Fire') is an Israeli settlement in the West Bank near Shilo. It falls under the jurisdiction of the Mateh Binyamin Regional Council. The population in 2005 was under 12 families.

The international community considers Israeli settlements in the West Bank illegal under international law, but the Israeli government disputes this.

== History ==
Esh Kodesh was founded in 2000 near Shvut Rachel, one of several such settlements in the area. It was named for Esh Kodesh Gilmore, 25, who was killed by Palestinian militants while working as a security guard at a branch of the National Insurance Institute in East Jerusalem. Esh Kodesh is also a book of sermons delivered by the Admor of Piaseczno in the Warsaw Ghetto from the outbreak of World War II in September 1939 until July 1942, when the Jews of the ghetto were deported to the death camp at Treblinka. According to ARIJ, Israel confiscated land from the two Palestinian villages of Jalud and Qusra in order to construct the Israeli outposts of Ahiya and Esh Kodesh.

To meet the security challenges of living in an area where their presence generates hostility, residents have, in the past, undergone Mishmeret Yesha self-defense training.

In 2010, the Israeli Supreme Court sentenced Zvi Strook, a resident of Esh Kodesh and the son of Orit Strook, head of the Human Rights Organization of Judea and Samaria, to 18 months in prison for the kidnapping and assault of a Palestinian teenager. In 2012, the IDF civil administration ordered Strook to vacate the land of Jalud resident Fauzi Ibrahim, which he had illegally occupied since 2010. Strook appealed the order, and when his appeal was rejected by the IDF appeals committee in 2014, he appealed to the Supreme Court. In December 2015, the Supreme Court rejected his appeal, but granted him 12 months to vacate the land.

In September 2011, the Israel Defense Forces established a base near Esh Kodesh On 23 September 2011, Israeli security forces were called in to break up a clash between the settlers and a group of 300 villagers from Qusra. Due to the growing tension, residents of Qusra armed with flashlights and sticks began to patrol the perimeter of their village at night to thwart possible incursions by Esh Kodesh settlers.

In early January 2013, after the Israeli High Court of Justice had ruled that the Palestinians of Qusra should be allowed to use one of their fields near Esh Kodesh, the Israeli Border police tried to enforce the ruling. This led to clashes with the Esh Kodesh settlers, leaving two Border Police injured.

On 5 January 2013, approximately 200 Palestinians cut through the fences of the vineyard and attacked the vineyards and residents of Esh Kodesh. Twelve residents were injured, with one taken to the hospital. The vineyards were destroyed, a security vehicle was damaged, and the attackers neared homes before the military arrived. The incident was part of a continuing dispute between the Esh Kodesh settlers and nearby Palestinians over land ownership.

On December 11, 2025, the Israeli government legalized Esh Kodesh.

== Involvement in attacks against Palestinians ==
Settlers from Esh Kodesh have participated in price tag attacks, and other forms of settler violence against Palestinians.

- 21 October 2011: A group of four armed and masked men from Esh Kodesh went to the Palestinian village of Jalud, threw a stun grenade at Palestinian workers who were harvesting and fired in the direction of the harvesters, some of whom were then clubbed. According to the testimony of Israeli eyewitnesses, the IDF and Border Police present did not intervene, other than to fire tear gas grenades both at the harvesters and the wounded.
- 3 January 2013: According to Palestinians, in a village south-east of Nablus, four cars had their tires slashed, with the words "Solidarity with Esh Kodesh", and a Star of David spray-painted on a nearby wall.
- 7 January 2014: Cars were burnt and price tag graffiti, reading "Esh Kodesh", "revenge", and a Star of David, were sprayed in Madama, Nablus, a Palestinian village south of Nablus.
- 8 January 2014: 30 fruit trees were cut down in a Palestinian garden center next to Kfar Qassem. The site was blazed with the slogan "Regards Eish Kodesh."
- On 9 January 2026, settlers from Ahiya and Esh Kodesh, broke into Jalud’s secondary school, which serves about 210 students. During the incident, flammable materials were thrown into a classroom and graffiti was sprayed on the walls.
