= Ahiya =

Israeli settlement in the West Bank

Coordinates: 32°3′42″N 35°19′37″E

- Israeli settlement
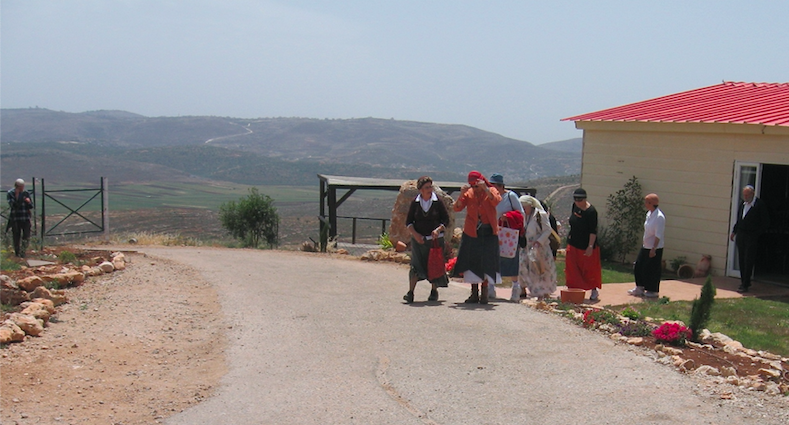
- Israeli settlers in Ahiya
- Interactive map of Ahiya
- Country: Palestine
- District: Judea and Samaria Area
- Council: Mateh Binyamin
- Region: West Bank

Ahiya (Hebrew: אחיה; also transliterated as Achiya or Achia) is an Israeli settlement in the West Bank, about 1.5 km southeast of the Palestinian village of Jalud. It falls under the purview of the Mateh Binyamin Regional Council. The international community considers Israeli settlements in the West Bank illegal under international law, but the Israeli government disputes this.

It is named after the Biblical prophet Ahijah the Shilonite who lived in Shiloh, which is about 3 km to its west.

== Demographics ==
As of 2004 permanent construction of homes in Ahiya was being carried out. As of 2011 the population of Ahiya was about 50 people.

== Geography ==
Ahiya is near the Israeli outpost of Shvut Rachel as well as Jalud.

According to ARIJ, Israel confiscated land from the Palestinian villages of Jalud and Qusra in order to construct the Israeli outposts of Ahiya and Esh Kodesh.

== Economy ==
Ahiya has the only Israeli-owned oil press in the region. Settlers from the region bring their olives to Ahiya to be pressed.

== Attacks against Palestinians ==
Palestinian farmers from nearby Jalud have accused settlers from Ahiya of taking harvested olives from them by force.

In 2022, Haaretz reported that residents of Ahiya attacked Jalud with firebombs, torching cars and house yards, in what the Israeli newspaper called a "pogrom", "flaunt evil" and "settler terror".
