= Adei Ad =

Adei Ad: עדי עד (Hebrew)
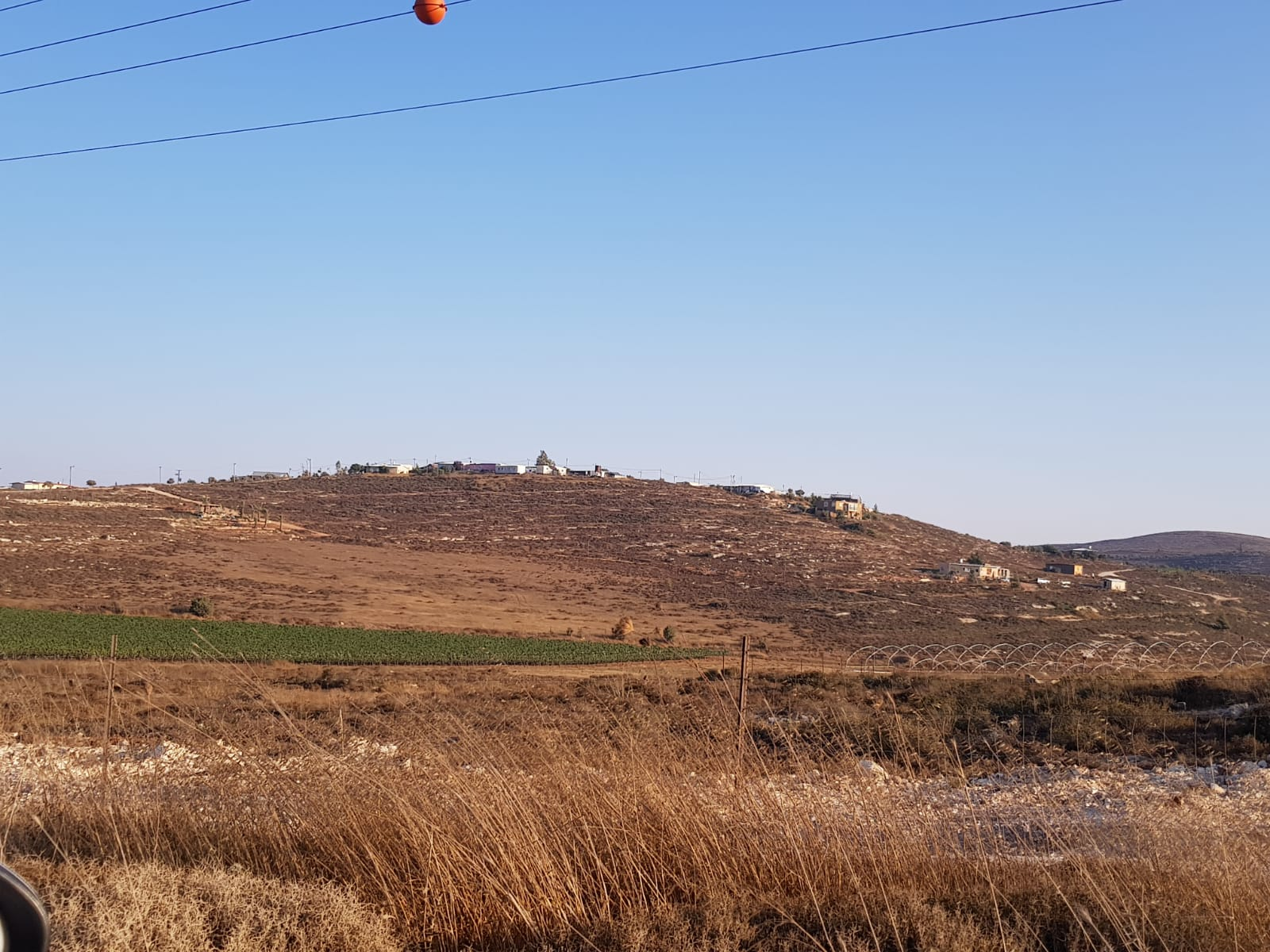

- Location within the Central West Bank
- Coordinates: 32°2′26″N 35°20′6″E
- Country: Palestine
- District: Judea and Samaria Area
- Council: Mateh Binyamin
- Region: West Bank
- Founded: 1998
- Founder: Boaz Melet

Adei Ad (Hebrew: עדי עד, lit. 'For ever and ever') is an Israeli settlement in the West Bank. Founded as an illegal Israeli outpost in 1998, it was retroactively legalized by the Israeli government in 2025. It is located near the Shvut Rachel settlement and the Palestinian village of Duma. Adei Ad gained international attention in January 2015, when residents allegedly engaged in throwing rocks at a delegation from the U.S. embassy.

The international community considers Israeli settlements in the West Bank illegal under international law, but the Israeli government disputes this.

== History ==
=== Founding ===
Adei Ad was established as an outpost in 1998 by a group of students at the Sdot Amir yeshiva in Shvut Rachel. Initially named Shvut Rachel F, it was later named Adei Ad after a Bible verse from Psalm 132:14: "This is my resting place for ever and ever." It is located near the Shvut Rachel settlement and the Palestinian village of Duma. The outpost began as one trailer inhabited by Boaz and Segula Melet and their children. It grew to 10 trailers by the following year.

Israeli news sources reported in 2003 that although the Israeli government was following its policy of dismantling them, it was simultaneously funding the construction of illegal outposts, including Adei Ad. Melet has stated that government officials covertly assisted in setting up the outpost, for example by paving the road. Adei Ad was the beneficiary of agricultural aid from Mishmeret Yesha, which by 2008 had cleared large areas of land around the outpost and planted thousands of dunams of grapevines.

=== Israeli attempts to dismantle the outpost ===
In 1999 Israeli Prime Minister Ehud Barak ordered the outpost dismantled. It was established on land privately owned by Palestinians and was therefore considered illegal under Israeli law, although the ownership was disputed by the settlers. In 2003 the Israeli High Court of Justice ruled that the land was owned by the state of Israel. The Israeli government, however, claimed that, despite its being state-owned, the settlers had no right to build there.

In June 2003 the Israel Defense Forces (IDF) deployed paratroopers to blockade Adei Ad while it was dismantled. An IDF officer asked to be excused from participating in the blockade and was advised by his commanding officer that he could participate indirectly by briefing other soldiers involved in the operation. He refused this order as well and was subsequently jailed. After settlers confronted soldiers at the site, 26 arrests were made and the High Court of Justice temporarily halted the dismantling operation. Binyamin Regional Council leader Pinchas Wallerstein accused the Israeli government of scheduling the dismantling of the outpost to coincide with a visit to Israel of U.S. Secretary of State Condoleezza Rice to show its commitment to the ongoing peace process.

In July 2008 soldiers from the IDF demolished an illegal structure in Adei Ad. This led to retaliatory attacks on the IDF by settlers, which prompted the IDF Central Command to prohibit Israeli cars from entering parts of the West Bank for two days to prevent militant right-wing Israelis from joining in the violence. The IDF accused the then mayor of Kedumim, Daniella Weiss, of orchestrating and encouraging the settler violence.

In July 2009 soldiers from the IDF demolished a single caravan in Adei Ad, prompting settlers from Kedumim to attack the IDF with stones, injuring one. Five settlers were arrested in this incident. Retaliation for the home demolitions continued with further incidents of rock throwing and the burning of Palestinian-owned olive trees.

=== 2010s ===
Yesh Din recorded 71 crimes against Palestinians near Adei Ad between 2005 and 2014. The incidents include assaults, theft, trespassing, and threats. As of 2014, Yesh Din reported that the only conviction was against Melet for directing yeshiva students to rob olive trees belonging to Palestinians.

In January 2015, settlers from Adei Ad threw stones at diplomats from a U.S. delegation who had arrived to inspect vandalism reported at a grove of Palestinian-owned trees in the occupied West Bank. It was reported that Israeli settlers from the outpost were suspected of uprooting thousands of olive tree saplings, some of which had been planted in honor of senior Palestinian official Ziad Abu Ein, who collapsed and died after an altercation with an Israeli soldier. The American consulate came to inspect the grove because some of the land owners claim U.S. citizenship. This is the first known physical attack by Israelis against American diplomatic staff.

In July 2015, a resident of Adei Ad murdered 3 members of a Palestinian family by firebombing their home in Duma. Security forces raided Adei Ad in response. He was later given 3 consecutive life sentences.

Settlers from Adei Ad allegedly killed Palestinian Hamdi Na’asan in January 2019. They said they attacked in self-defense after a settler was stabbed, while Palestinian witnesses said Na'asan was shot in the back.

=== 2020s ===
The Israeli government proposed a plan to make Adei Ad part of the Amihai settlement in 2018, thereby legalizing the outpost. Critics noted that this would result in the effective severance of West Bank's territorial contiguity, specifically between Central West Bank (Ramallah and Jerusalem) and Northern West Bank (Nablus, Jenin, etc.). Additionally, it would have the effect of undermining the prospects of the realization of the Two-state solution. Adei Ad was recognized as a settlement by the Israeli government in the end of 2025.

== Population ==
As of July 2009 the population of Adei Ad was about 20 settler families.
