= Duma, Nablus =

Palestinian town in the West Bank

Duma
- Municipality type D (Village council)

Arabic transcription(s)
  - Arabic: دوما
  - Latin: Doma (official)
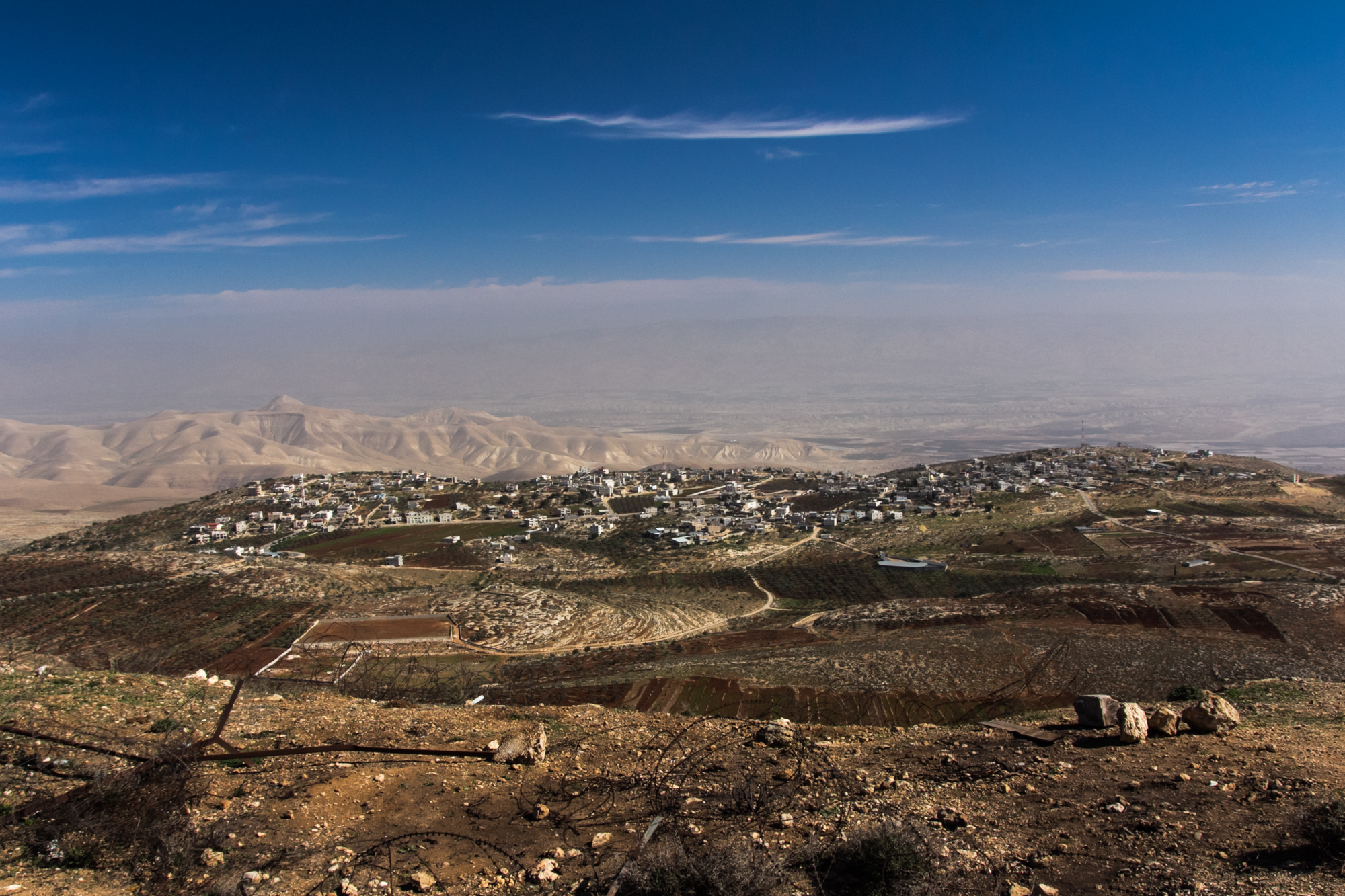
- View of Duma, January 2014

- Location of Duma within Palestine
- Coordinates: 32°03′27″N 35°22′02″E
- Palestine grid: 184/162
- State: State of Palestine
- Governorate: Nablus

Government
  - Type: Village council
  - Head of Municipality: Abd al-Salaam Dawabsha

Area
  - Total: 17.4 km^{2} (6.7 sq mi)

Population (2017)
  - Total: 2,674
  - Density: 154/km^{2} (398/sq mi)
- Name meaning: The lotus

Duma (Arabic: دوما, also spelled as Douma) is a Palestinian town in the Nablus Governorate in the northern West Bank, located 25 kilometers southeast of Nablus. According to the Palestinian Central Bureau of Statistics, the town had a population of 2,674 inhabitants in 2017. Duma's total land area consists of 17,351 dunams, about 200 of which are designated as built-up area.

In 2015, Israeli settlers perpetrated the Duma arson attack, which resulted in the murder of two Palestinian civilians and their 18 month baby in the village.

== Location ==
Duma is located 20.3 km southeast of Nablus. It is bordered by Al Jiftlik and Fasayil to the east, Majdal Bani Fadil to the north, Qusra and Jalud to the west, and Al Mughayyir to the south.

== History ==
Pottery sherds from the Hellenistic, Hellenistic/Roman and Roman era have been found here.

It has been suggested that Duma was the Biblical city of Arumah (Judges 9:41) and the place called Edumia in the Onomasticon.

South–southwest of the village is a spring called Ayn Duma, where water has been collected in ancient small pools, some hollowed out of rock.

=== Ottoman era ===
Duma, like the rest of Palestine, was incorporated into the Ottoman Empire in 1517, and in the census of 1596 the village appeared under the name Duma as being in the Nahiya (Subdistrict) of Jabal Qubal of the Liwa (District) of Nablus. It had a population of 23 households, all Muslim. They paid a fixed tax-rate of 33.3% on agricultural products, including wheat, barley, summer crops, olive trees, goats and bee-hives; in addition to occasional revenues; a total of 1,300 akçe.

In 1838 Edward Robinson noted Daumeh located in El-Beitawy district, east of Nablus.

In 1870, Victor Guérin visited and noted: "The village was formerly defended by two towers, one on the east and the other on the west. One of them was 18 paces long by 13 broad, and the other was 17 paces long by 8 in breadth. Some of the lower courses are still in place, and show that the towers were built of stones of large dimensions, some cut smooth and others in boss. These remains, separated by a space of about 750 yards, prove ancient work. The antiquity of the site is also proved by the numerous excavations in the rock, such as cisterns and subterranean magazines, found everywhere." Guérin further noted that the village had 300 inhabitants.

In 1882, the PEF's Survey of Western Palestine (SWP) described it as "A small village on the top of a ridge. It has cisterns and ancient rock-cut tombs. There is a spring, 'Ain Umm 'Omeir, 3/4 mile southeast of the houses. On the north is the ruin of a place sacred to el Khudr, St. George. There are olives to the north." The SWP also thought that the mosque of the village, with drafted stones, was a former church of St. George.

Residents of Duma have their origins in Silwad and Jericho.I

=== British Mandate era ===
In the 1922 census of Palestine conducted by the British Mandate authorities, Duma had a population of 155 inhabitants, all Muslims, increasing in the 1931 census to 218, still all Muslims, in a total of 43 houses.

n the 1945 statistics, Duma had a population of 310 Muslims, with 17,351 dunams of land, according to an official land and population survey. Of this, 580 dunams were plantations and irrigable land, 4,076 used for cereals, while 33 dunams were built-up (urban) land.

=== Jordanian era ===
In the wake of the 1948 Arab–Israeli War, and after the 1949 Armistice Agreements, Duma came under Jordanian rule.

The Jordanian census of 1961 found 444 inhabitants.

=== 1967-present ===
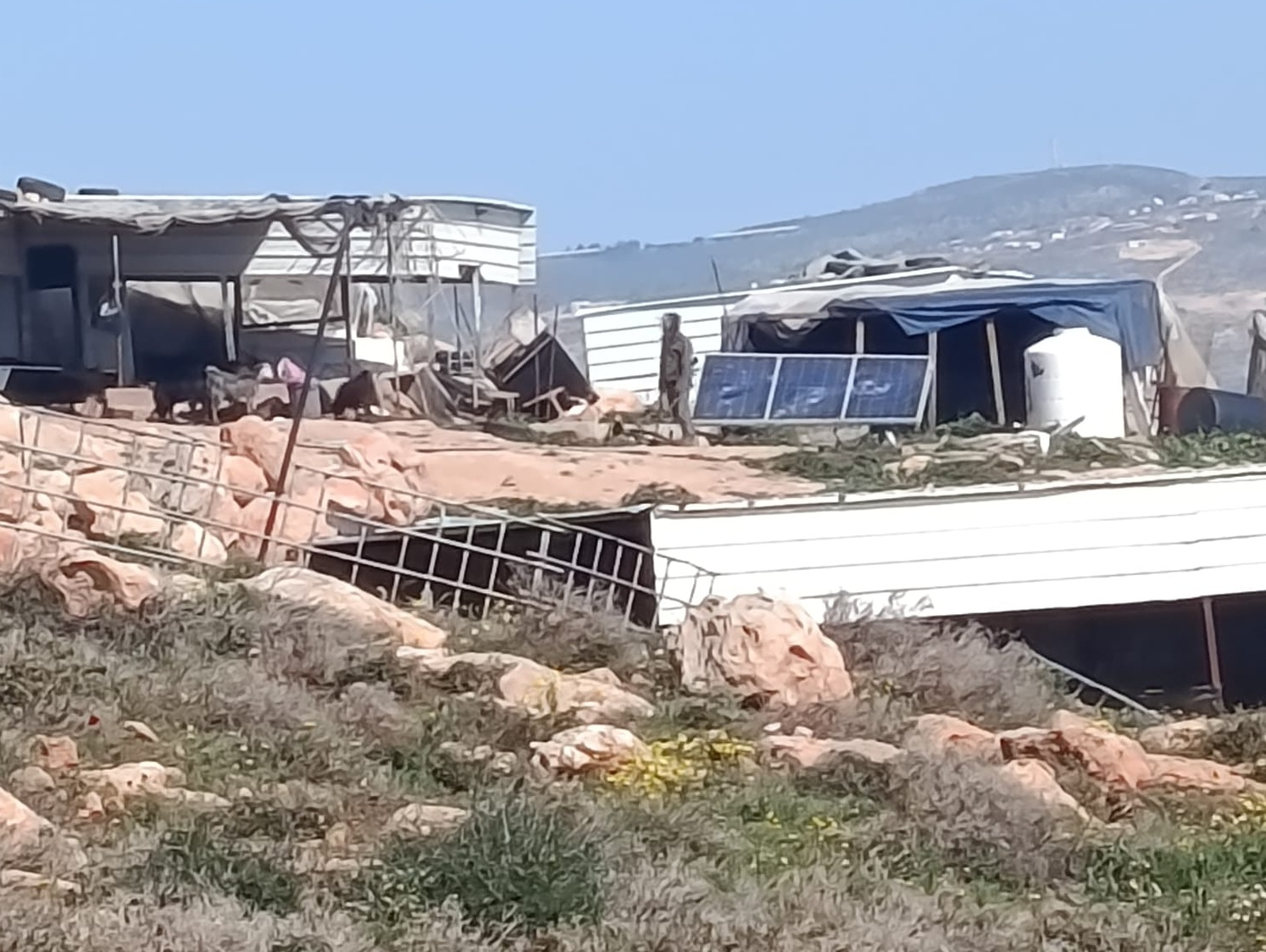
Israeli Settlers vandalizing Palestinian property, Shikara bedouin encampment east of Douma, Nablus

Since the Six-Day War in 1967, Duma has been under Israeli occupation. Prior to 1967, nearly all of Duma's working male residents were farmers. Since then the number of farmers has been reduced since many residents have found work in construction in Israel or work in small businesses in the town. However, Duma's residents still mostly rely on irrigated crops, fruit orchards, olive groves and livestock for food. Water is provided to Duma by four springs: Fasayel to the west, Ein Duma and Rashash to the south and Umm Amir to the east. Fasayel, the largest spring, is also used by Israeli authorities to distribute water to nearby Israeli settlements.

Duma has three schools for girls and boys and the town established a Mayo Clinic in 2002 with the help of the Palestinian Ministry of Health.

After the 1995 accords, 5% of Duma land was classified as Area B, the remaining 95% as Area C.

On 31 July 2015, suspected Israeli settlers firebombed two homes in Duma, killing 18-month-old Ali Saad Dawabsha and critically injuring his parents and 4-year-old brother. The boy, Ali, died in the attack; his father, 32, died later of second-degree burns over most of his body, followed by the death of his wife, from her injuries, about 5 weeks later. The attack is believed to be a price tag attack by Israeli settlers, who were seen fleeing towards Ma'ale Efrayim. The attack was condemned as an act of terrorism by the Palestinian government and Israel.

In September 2017, the Israeli forces notified the residents of a housing complex near Duma that their sole water pipeline was slated for removal, on the grounds that the pipeline is “illegal.”

In April 2025, around 50 Israelis attacked residences and residents of Duma, setting fires, reportedly injuring three Palestinians; Israel security forces said that they conducted efforts to "disperse the violent confrontation" between Israeli civilians and Palestinians, but no arrests were announced.

During the 2026 Israel–Iran war, Israel imposed an almost total military curfew for Palestinians across the West Bank, closing checkpoints, blocking inter-city and inter-village roads with iron gates and earth mounds, and installing new gates in additional locations. The report states that settlers, with army backing, exploited the restrictions to intensify attacks and attempts to displace Palestinian communities.

The village’s only entrance and exit was closed, with soldiers and settlers present. According to the head of the Duma village council, Hussein Dawabsha, residents could not leave even on foot, an evacuation request for an 88-year-old patient was refused, and entry of cooking gas and food supplies was restricted, leaving shops empty during Ramadan.

In March 2026, Israeli authorities declared the entire village and nearby al-Shikara Bedouin community a closed military zone for one month, prohibiting entry by non-residents. According to activists, the order effectively prevented the arrival of protective presence peace activists who had previously protected residents in response to repeated settler attacks. In the days before the order was issued, soldiers reportedly conducted patrols in the area to identify locations where activists were staying.

Activists reported that settlers began exploiting the absence of observers almost immediately. On the evening of Tuesday, settlers ranscaked the structure that had been used to house activists. Earlier that week, settlers burned electrical wires in the village and destroyed an unused chicken coop. When two Palestinian residents arrived to assess the damage, settlers riding an all-terrain vehicle attempted to attack them, using pepper spray and beating one of the youths with a club. One Palestinian was reportedly assaulted and had his mobile phone stolen.

Israeli activist Esti Reicht, who had been present in the village prior to the declaration of the closed military zone, stated that soldiers were patrolling the area during the day and that one soldier arrived during the assault but did not intervene to protect the activists. According to her account, settlers punctured the tires of her car and smashed a headlight. Activists also reported that although the closed military zone order formally applied to settlers as well, it was not enforced against them.

== Bibliography ==
- Barron, J.B., ed. (1923). Palestine: Report and General Abstracts of the Census of 1922. Government of Palestine.
- Conder, C.R.; Kitchener, H.H. (1882). The Survey of Western Palestine: Memoirs of the Topography, Orography, Hydrography, and Archaeology. Vol. 2. London: Committee of the Palestine Exploration Fund.
- Dauphin, C. (1998). La Palestine byzantine, Peuplement et Populations. BAR International Series 726 (in French). Vol. III : Catalogue. Oxford: Archeopress. ISBN 0-860549-05-4.
- Finkelstein, I.; Lederman, Zvi, eds. (1997). Highlands of many cultures. Tel Aviv: Institute of Archaeology of Tel Aviv University Publications Section. ISBN 965-440-007-3.
- Government of Jordan, Department of Statistics (1964). First Census of Population and Housing. Volume I: Final Tables; General Characteristics of the Population (PDF).
- Government of Palestine, Department of Statistics (1945). Village Statistics, April, 1945.
- Guérin, V. (1875). Description Géographique Historique et Archéologique de la Palestine (in French). Vol. 2: Samarie, pt. 2. Paris: L'Imprimerie Nationale.
- Hadawi, S. (1970). Village Statistics of 1945: A Classification of Land and Area ownership in Palestine. Palestine Liberation Organization Research Center.
- Hütteroth, W.-D.; Abdulfattah, K. (1977). Historical Geography of Palestine, Transjordan and Southern Syria in the Late 16th Century. Erlanger Geographische Arbeiten, Sonderband 5. Erlangen, Germany: Vorstand der Fränkischen Geographischen Gesellschaft. ISBN 3-920405-41-2.
- Mills, E., ed. (1932). Census of Palestine 1931. Population of Villages, Towns and Administrative Areas. Jerusalem: Government of Palestine.
- Palmer, E.H. (1881). The Survey of Western Palestine: Arabic and English Name Lists Collected During the Survey by Lieutenants Conder and Kitchener, R. E. Transliterated and Explained by E.H. Palmer. Committee of the Palestine Exploration Fund.
- Robinson, E.; Smith, E. (1841). Biblical Researches in Palestine, Mount Sinai and Arabia Petraea: A Journal of Travels in the year 1838. Vol. 3. Boston: Crocker & Brewster.
