= Qusra =

- Municipality type C

Arabic transcription(s)
  - Arabic: قُصرة
- Location of Qusra within Palestine
- Coordinates: 32°05′7″N 35°19′48″E
- Palestine grid: 181/165
- State: State of Palestine
- Governorate: Nablus

Government
  - Type: Municipality
  - Head of Municipality: Mohammad Jaber

Population (2017)
  - Total: 5,418
- Name meaning: "One palace"

Qusra (also Kusra) (Arabic: قُصرة) is a Palestinian village in the Nablus Governorate of the State of Palestine, in the northern West Bank, located 28 kilometers southeast of Nablus. According to the Palestinian Central Bureau of Statistics (PCBS), Qusra had a population of 5,418 inhabitants in 2017.

According to Applied Research Institute–Jerusalem, Israel confiscated land from the two Palestinian villages of Jalud and Qusra in order to construct the two illegal Israeli outposts of Ahiya and Esh Kodesh.

== Location ==
Qusra is located 16.3 km south east of Nablus. It is bordered by Majdal Bani Fadil and Duma to the east, Jurish to the north, Talfit to the west, and Jalud to the south.

== History ==
=== Ottoman era ===
In 1596 the village appeared in Ottoman tax registers under the name of Qusayra as being in the nahiya of Jabal Qubal in the liwa of Nablus. It had a population of 14 households, all Muslim. The villagers paid a fixed tax-rate of 33.3% on agricultural products, including wheat, barley, summer crops, olive trees, goats and/or beehives; a total of 3,000 akçe. According to Finkelstein et al., Qusra has never been surveyed. They estimated early Ottoman remains based on Hütteroth and Abdulfattah.

In 1838 Qusra (spelled Kausara) was classified as a Muslim village in the subdistrict of el-Beitawi. The French explorer Victor Guérin described passing by several "magnificent" oaks on the way to the village in May 1870. The village, which he called Kesrah, was described as having about 200 inhabitants. Guérin also noted several ancient rock-cut cisterns, the largest of which was at the lower part of the village.

In 1882 the PEF's Survey of Western Palestine (SWP) noted that: "West of the village are foundations, and heaps of stones." SWP also described the village (called Kusrah) as: "A village of middling size, on low ground, with olive-trees." In the early years of the 20th century, towards the end of Ottoman rule, Qusra was part of the Jalud-based sheikhdom of Mashiyah Dar al-Haj Mahmud which was nominally administered by the Nasr Mansur family.

=== British Mandate era ===
In the 1922 census of Palestine, conducted by the British Mandate authorities, Qusra had a population of 707, all Muslims, increasing in the 1931 census to 851, still all Muslim, in 213 occupied houses.

In the 1945 statistics Qusra had a population of 1,120, all Muslim, with 8,938 dunams of land, according to an official land and population survey. Of this, 2,763 dunams were plantations and irrigable land, 3,091 used for cereals, while 69 dunams were built-up (urban) land.

=== Jordanian era ===
In the wake of the 1948 Arab–Israeli War, and after the 1949 Armistice Agreements, Qusra came under Jordanian rule.

The Jordanian census of 1961 found 1,312 inhabitants.

=== 1967-present ===
After the Six-Day War in 1967, Qusra has been under Israeli occupation.

After the 1995 accords, 50% of the village land was classified as Area B land, the remaining 50% as Area C. 177 dunums of village land was confiscated by Israel in order to build the Israeli settlement of Migdalim.

On 24 December 2014, Israeli forces destroyed with bulldozers over 400 square metres of the village's traditional stone walls close to Migdalim.

==== September 2011 ====
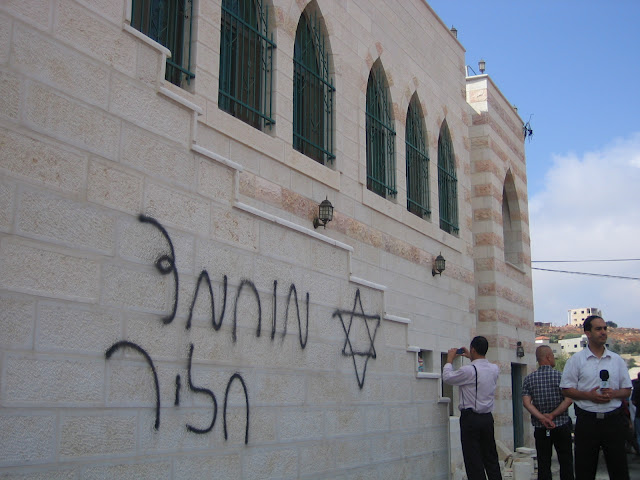
""Mohammad is a pig", graffiti by Israeli settlers from Esh Kodesh on the al-Nurayn Mosque of Qusra, 2011

On the night of 4–5 September 2011, a group of presumably Israeli settlers entered the village at 3 a.m., vandalized the village's Al-Nurayn mosque and tried to set it on fire. They smashed windows, rolled burning tires inside, and wrote "Muhammad is a pig" in Hebrew on its wall. The attack on the mosque came shortly after Israeli police officers had destroyed three illegal structures in the settlement outpost of Migron north of Jerusalem. According to Agence France Press, the graffiti also included a Star of David, and the name “Migron”. The attack, not the first of its kind, is viewed as part of a policy called “price tag” followed by a radical segment among the settlers, in which they respond to attempts by the Israeli security forces to demolish unauthorized Jewish settlements with attacks against Palestinians.

The Palestinian Authority condemned the attack and called on the Middle East Quartet to get involved. The Israeli government also condemned the attack, and has instructed its authorities to “bring those responsible to justice,” and urged all sides to avoid the potential for escalation. The European Union representative for Foreign Affairs and Security Policy Catherine Ashton issued a statement which strongly condemned the attack on the mosque, stating: "These provocations seriously undermine efforts to build the necessary trust for a comprehensive peace in the region; [...] attacks against places of worship undermine the freedom of religion or belief which is a fundamental human right," calling on Israeli authorities "to investigate the attack, bring the perpetrators to justice and prevent such attacks happening again." The United States Department of State also strongly condemned the “dangerous and provocative attacks” on the mosque and called on those responsible to be arrested and “subject to the full force of the law”.

Qusra lies outside the jurisdiction of the Palestinian Authority and depends on the Israeli military for protection, and its residents have no weapons. They organised a neighborhood watch consisting of between 15 and 20 volunteers, who patrol nightly. In case of trouble, the volunteers have instructions to phone the governor of Nablus who would contact the Israeli Army (IDF). According to Qusra mayor Hani Abu Murad, the patrol scared off settlers who had approached the village a few days after the mosque was defaced.

On 23 September 2011, a group of about a dozen settlers from a nearby outpost approached Qusra, and a warning was announced from the mosque speakers. A large group from Qusra confronted the settlers, and threw stones, after which the Israeli Army arrived, protecting the settlers. The IDF first fired tear gas, then live rounds, killing one man, identified as Essam Kamal Badran, 35, by Qusra mayor Abu Murad, according to Haaretz. A statement from the IDF confirmed its troops had used live fire against the Palestinians after rocks were thrown at security personnel, and said it was working with Palestinian security officials to investigate.

The incident received widespread publicity as it occurred just hours before Palestinian President Mahmoud Abbas took the podium at the U.N. General Assembly, making his quest for recognition of a Palestinian state.

==== November 2017 ====
On 30 November 2017, a group of Israeli settlers, consisting of thirteen year old kids and two accompanying adult settlers went on a bar mitzvah hike near the village. The adults were armed with an M16 rifle and a pistol.

According to the Palestinians, one of the Israeli settlers shot killed a local Palestinian man, Mahmoud Zael Oudeh, and the villagers then surrounded and pelted the settlers with rocks.

According to the Israelis, the villagers first surrounded the settlers, who took shelter in a cave during which time Palestinians entered the cave and pressed on with the attack, until the Israeli army arrived on the scene. The Israeli army claimed that the hikers did not coordinate their hike with them, however the hikers dispute this and have presented an e-mail requesting authorization and claim they received a verbal confirmation. A week after the incident the Israeli army recovered equipment taken from the hikers in the village and arrested 20 Qusra residents for participation in the incident, subsequent violent clashes, and incitement to terrorism. A Palestinian man was indicted for attempted murder for hurling large rocks at close range inside the cave, lightly wounding the head of one of the adult chaperones. After being treated for his injuries, one accompanying parent was questioned as a negligent homicide suspect over Oudeh's death where he claimed self-defence, subsequent Israeli police investigation claimed that he acted in "self-defense".

==== October 2023 ====
On 11 October 2023, 3 Palestinians were shot dead by Israeli settlers (2 teenagers and a 25-year-old man); a 21-year-old was killed by Israeli soldiers later on. On 12 October 2023, Israeli settlers confronted the funeral procession and killed a father and son.

==== July 2026 ====
On 24 July 2026, four Palestinians and two Israeli soldiers died in the nearby village of Tell after clashes that broke out when a group of settlers entered an area of the West Bank for an "unauthorized hike."

On 26 July 2026, Israeli settlers set fire to the village's newly constructed al-Rahma mosque, causing damage to the building and spray-painting Hebrew graffiti including the slogan "Revenge Benayahu", referring to one of the Israeli soldiers killed during clashes near Tell two days earlier. The attack formed part of a series of settler attacks on Palestinian villages in the northern West Bank, during which another mosque in the nearby village of Kafr ad-Dik was also targeted. The Israeli military condemned the attacks on religious sites and said it was investigating the incidents.

==== August 2026 ====
In August, Jewish settlers laid siege to the home of an American Palestinian family and some of its inhabitants for at least 10 days. The U.S. ambassador to Israel, Mike Huckabee, called the siege a "horrific act of terror." Also in August, Israeli settlers seized a house, with its residents at home. The Israel Defense Forces said the riots were dispersed "using various means."

==== September 2026 ====
One settler was arrested on 3 September by Israeli police.

== Bibliography ==
- Barron, J.B., ed. (1923). Palestine: Report and General Abstracts of the Census of 1922. Government of Palestine.
- Conder, C.R.; Kitchener, H.H. (1882). The Survey of Western Palestine: Memoirs of the Topography, Orography, Hydrography, and Archaeology. Vol. 2. London: Committee of the Palestine Exploration Fund.
- Finkelstein, I.; Lederman, Zvi, eds. (1997). Highlands of many cultures. Tel Aviv: Institute of Archaeology of Tel Aviv University Publications Section. ISBN 965-440-007-3.
- Government of Jordan, Department of Statistics (1964). First Census of Population and Housing. Volume I: Final Tables; General Characteristics of the Population (PDF).
- Government of Palestine, Department of Statistics (1945). Village Statistics, April, 1945.
- Guérin, V. (1875). Description Géographique Historique et Archéologique de la Palestine (in French). Vol. 2: Samarie, pt. 2. Paris: L'Imprimerie Nationale.
- Hadawi, S. (1970). Village Statistics of 1945: A Classification of Land and Area ownership in Palestine. Palestine Liberation Organization Research Center.
- Hütteroth, W.-D.; Abdulfattah, K. (1977). Historical Geography of Palestine, Transjordan and Southern Syria in the Late 16th Century. Erlanger Geographische Arbeiten, Sonderband 5. Erlangen, Germany: Vorstand der Fränkischen Geographischen Gesellschaft. ISBN 3-920405-41-2.
- Macalister, R.A.S.; Masterman, E. W. G. (1905). "The modern inhabitants of Palestine". Quarterly Statement - Palestine Exploration Fund. 37: 343–356. doi:10.1179/peq.1905.37.4.343.
- Mills, E., ed. (1932). Census of Palestine 1931. Population of Villages, Towns and Administrative Areas. Jerusalem: Government of Palestine.
- Palmer, E.H. (1881). The Survey of Western Palestine: Arabic and English Name Lists Collected During the Survey by Lieutenants Conder and Kitchener, R. E. Transliterated and Explained by E.H. Palmer. Committee of the Palestine Exploration Fund.
- Robinson, E.; Smith, E. (1841). Biblical Researches in Palestine, Mount Sinai and Arabia Petraea: A Journal of Travels in the year 1838. Vol. 3. Boston: Crocker & Brewster.
