= Shilo (Israeli settlement) =

Israeli settlement in the West Bank

Shilo שִׁילֹה
- Community settlement (from 1979)

Hebrew transcription(s)
  - Translit.: Šîlô
  - Also spelled: Shiloh (unofficial)
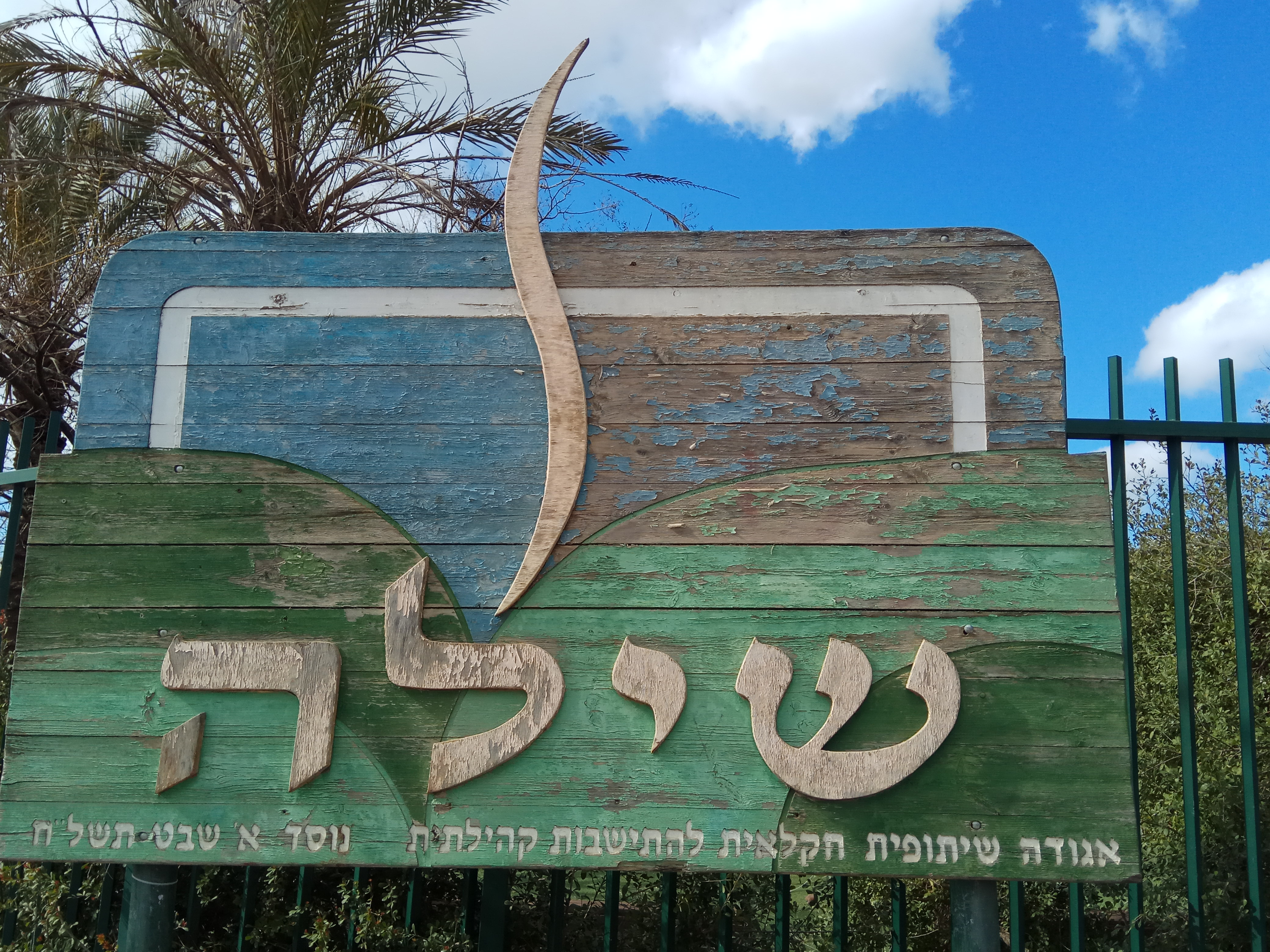
- A sign at the entrance to Shiloh

- Emblem
- Interactive map of Shilo
- Location within the Central West Bank
- Coordinates: 32°3′14″N 35°17′55″E
- Grid position: 216279/689627 ITM
- Region: West Bank
- District: Judea and Samaria Area
- Council: Mateh Binyamin
- Founded: 1978 (Israeli settlement)

Population (2024)
  - Total: 6,042
- Name meaning: Shiloh (biblical city)
- Website: shilo.org.il

Shilo (Hebrew: שִׁלֹה / שילה Šîlô) is an Israeli settlement in the northern West Bank. Located 45 kilometres (28 miles) north of Jerusalem on Route 60 and organised as a religious community settlement, it is neighboured by the Israeli settlements of Eli and Maale Levona and the Palestinian villages Sinjil, Turmus Ayya and Qaryut, and falls under the jurisdiction of Mateh Binyamin Regional Council.

In 2024 it had a population of 6,042 (the official census includes the population of Shvut Rachel and additional unincorporated communities to its east).

The international community considers Israeli settlements in the West Bank illegal under international law, but the Israeli government disputes this.

== History ==
According to the Gush Emunim movement, Shilo was considered a potential site for a settlement as early as 1974. In January 1978, a modern community was established adjacent to the ancient biblical site, Tel Shilo. According to the Applied Research Institute–Jerusalem (ARIJ), in order to construct Shilo, Israel confiscated land from two neighbouring Palestinian villages/towns, including 752 dunams (75.2 hectares) from Turmus Ayya, and 635 dunams (63.5 hectares) from Qaryut. In 1979, Shilo was officially included in the list of settlements under the Jurisdiction of the Settlement Section of the Jewish Agency. The village is administrated by the Mateh Binyamin Regional Council.

The ownership of the land that makes up Shilo is disputed. Settlers and the Israeli government claim that the settlement is built entirely on state land, owned by the state in 1967 or reverted to it because the owners had fled. Peace Now and local Palestinians claim that more than a quarter of Shilo is built on land privately owned by Palestinians. Shilo was cited by Oslo Peace Accords negotiator Yossi Beilin as an example of an area that should be transferred to Palestinian control due to its location in a densely populated Palestinian area."

On 27 November 2011, the Israeli Defense Ministry approved two plans for 119 new housing units built in Shilo, which would expand the settlement by 60%. The approval came as a response to a petition by Peace Now to the Israeli Supreme Court filed eight months before after construction began on 40 new housing units.

In February 2012 the Israeli government approved the construction of new housing units in Shilo. The approval of new and existing construction was condemned by the High Representative of the Union for Foreign Affairs and Security Policy of the European Union, Catherine Ashton, as a "provocative action" contrary to international law and Israel's obligations under the Quartet Roadmap, which states that "Israel should not only freeze all settlement activity, but also dismantle those settlements erected since March 2001."

On 7 April 2015, a 32-year-old Palestinian man stabbed two Israeli army paramedics, one of whom was seriously injured. He was shot dead at the entrance to the settlement after his attack.

Recently, Shilo has become a hub for Israeli settler violence, with several attacks being staged on the neighboring Palestinian town of Turmus Ayya. One of the most serious took place on 21 June 2023, when, in retaliation for the killing of four Israeli civilians, hundreds of masked settlers firebombed the town, killing one Palestinian. Further attacks took place throughout July 2024, with farmhouses and generators getting burned down.

On 4 August 2025, US House Speaker Mike Johnson and US Ambassador Mike Huckabee visited Shilo, where he was hosted by Prime Minister Benjamin Netanyahu. To date, they were the highest ranking foreign government officials to visit this community.

== Schools and synagogues ==
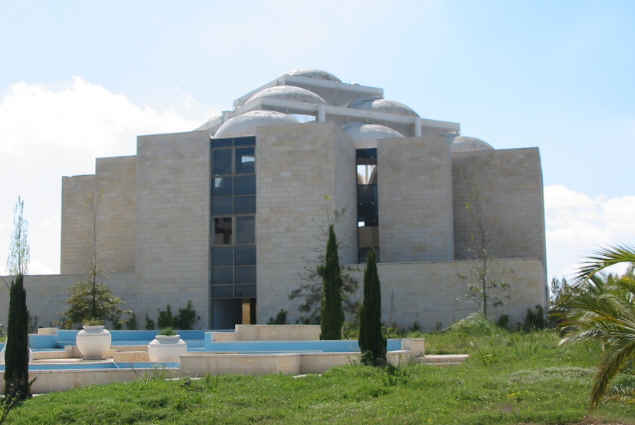
Yeshiva building under construction

Yeshivat Hesder Shilo was founded in 1979 and has over 100 students including 25 Kollel members. As a hesder yeshiva, the students of Shilo combine intensive studies with service in the IDF. The Rosh Yeshiva is Rabbi Aviv Gamliel, while Rabbi Michael Brom, founding Rosh Yeshiva, serves as president; Rosh Kollel is Rabbi Gavriel Gabbai. The Yeshiva emphasizes intellectual Torah study centered on Talmud and Halacha. It is, however, atypical in its parallel focus on emunah, internalization and character development, where there are formal study sessions focusing on both Musar literature and Chassidut as part of the daily program.

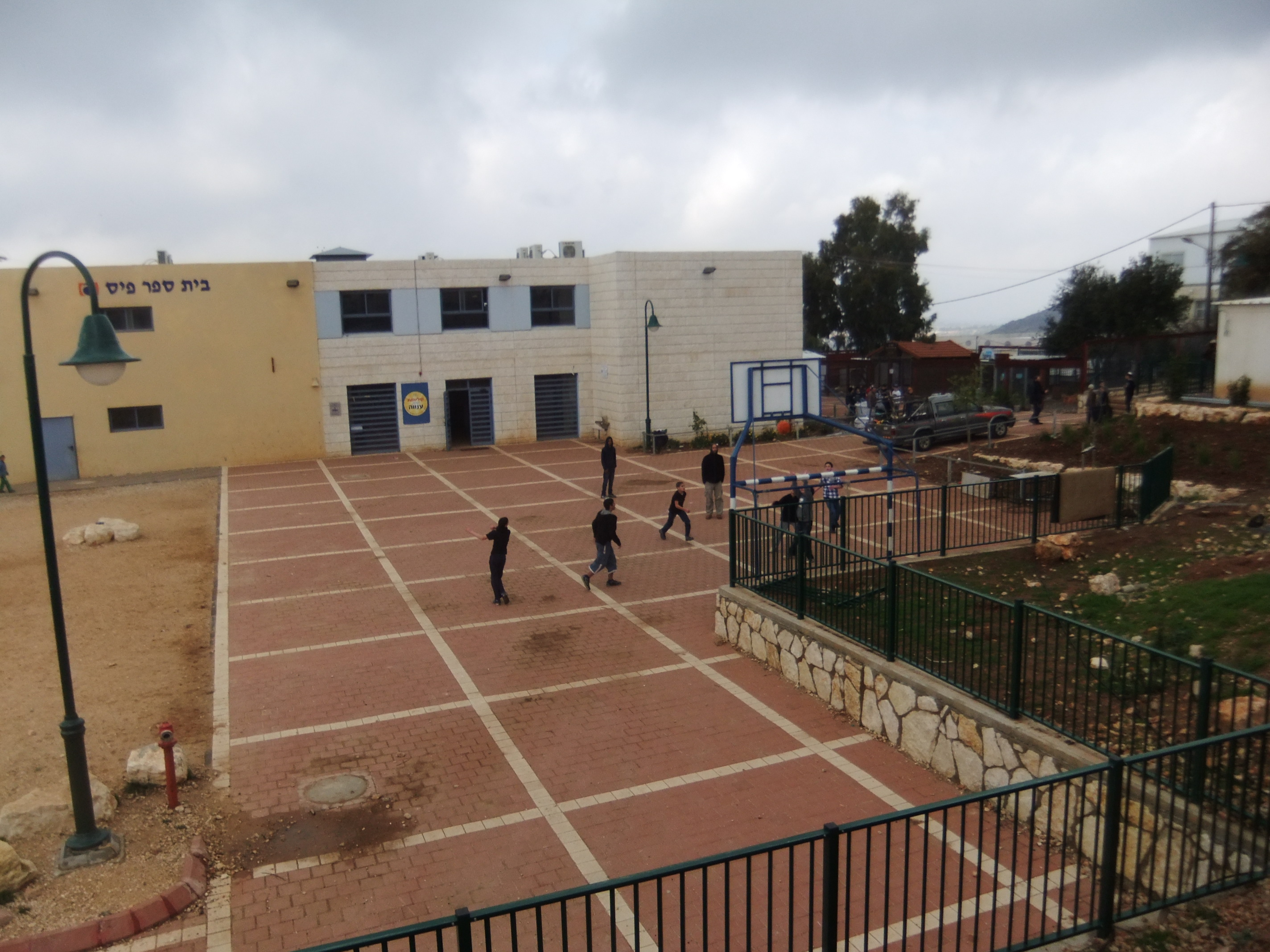
Schoolyard in Shilo

After completing the five-year program, some students continue their rabbinic studies in the kollel and pursue semicha from the Chief Rabbinate of Israel. Students may also certify as teachers with an academic degree (B.Ed.) in the Lifshitz College of Education, with which the yeshiva is affiliated. Many students and teaching staff choose to settle in Shilo permanently.

Midreshet Binat in Shvut Rachel, a midrasha headed by Rabbi Ronen Tamir, was established in 2000 as a branch of the yeshiva.

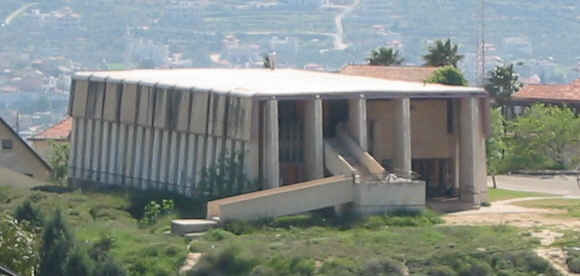
Mishkan Shiloh synagogue is a replica of the Biblical Tabernacle

The town's main synagogue is designed as a replica of the Biblical Tabernacle. It contains replicas and tributes to many of the utensils in the original Tabernacle of Shilo.

== Voting Patterns ==
In the 2026 election, 93 percent of voters in Shilo voted for the parties of the right-wing coalition led by Benjamin Netanyahu, while 1 percent voted for the parties of the center-left coalition led by Gadi Eisenkot and 0.04 percent voted for the Arab parties. An additional 1.2 percent voted for the Reservists, and 2.9 percent voted for Amcha Yisrael. 74 percent of voters voted for the Religious Zionist Party. Voter turnout increased 35 percent from the 2022 election.

== International law ==
The international community considers Israeli settlements to violate the Fourth Geneva Convention's prohibition on the deportation or transfer of parts of an occupying power's own civilian population into occupied territory except in those cases in which the security of the population or imperative military reasons so demand. Israel disputes that the Fourth Geneva Convention applies as the Palestinian territories had not been legally held by a sovereign prior to Israel capturing them. This view has been opposed by the International Committee of the Red Cross and the International Court of Justice.

== Biblical namesake ==
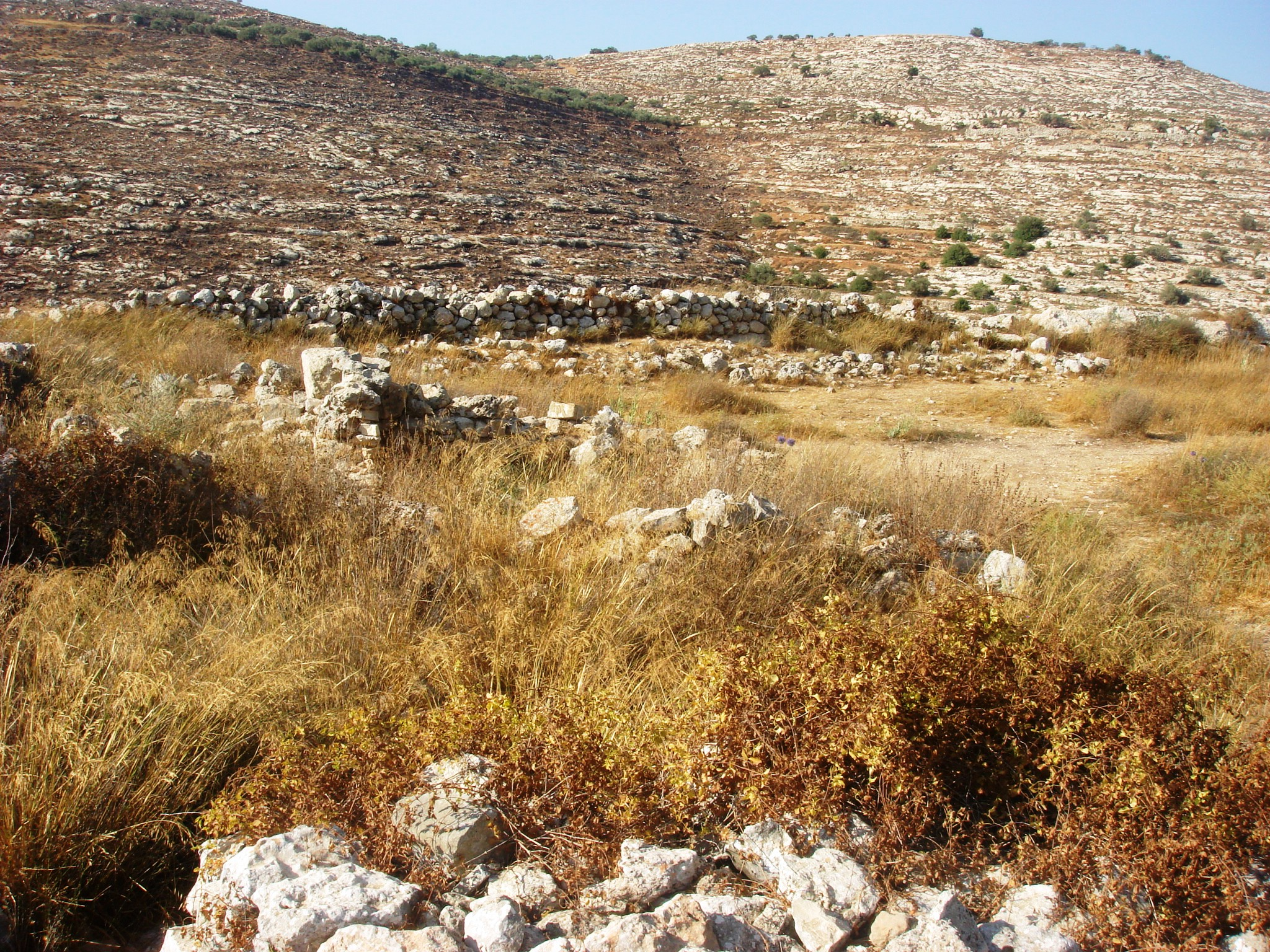
Tel Shilo

Shilo is named after the biblical city of Shiloh, which held an important place in the Biblical history of the Jewish people. Shilo is identified with Khirbet Seilun, also known as Tel Shiloh; the archaeological site is north-west of the settlement of Shilo. The first archaeological excavations began in 1922–1932 by a Danish expedition, which placed the finds in the Danish National Museum in Copenhagen.

Under international law an occupying power is not permitted to carry out archaeological excavations except to preserve or rescue a site. In 1980, Israel Finkelstein, an archaeologist from Bar-Ilan University, initiated four seasons of digs and many finds were revealed including coins, storage jars, and other artifacts. Many are preserved at Bar-Ilan University. In 1981–1982, Zeev Yeivin and Rabbi Yoel Bin-Nun excavated at the presumed site of the tabernacle. Ceramics and Egyptian figurines were found.

In the summer of 2010, excavations at Tel Shiloh were carried out under the auspices of the Staff Officer for Archeology in the Civilian Administration Antiquities Unit in cooperation with the Mateh Binyamin Regional Council. A portion of the Canaanite period wall from 3700 years ago was uncovered in an attempt to ascertain if this was the first evidence of civilization. One notable find, not far from the wall, was a Roman coin from the period of the Bar Kokhba revolt.

== Notable residents ==
- Rabbi Nissan Ben-Avraham

== See also ==
- Population statistics for Israeli settlements in the West Bank
