= Timeline of the Israeli–Palestinian conflict in January–June 2015 =

== 2015 ==
According to Walla!, from January 2015 until April 26, 172 attacks against the Jerusalem Border Police and SWAT teams were recorded. 148 Molotov cocktails and 15 explosive devices have been thrown at Border Police, 1 shooting incident, 4 stabbing attempts or attacks and 4 "car rampage"attacks (attempted or actualized) have been launched. Many of policemen have been injured in these clashes.

According to United Nations Office for the Coordination of Humanitarian Affairs (OCHA), from January 1 to April 22, at least 8,139 trees and saplings planted by Palestinians were uprooted or vandalized by Israeli settlers. Israeli search and arrest operations in the Palestinian territories, which averaged 75 per week earlier, rose to 86 per week in the first five months of 2015. According to the same source, averaging statistics from January through to June, 2 Israelis have been injured and, excluding settler assaults, 40 Palestinians have been injured by Israeli forces, per week. In the Hebron governorate alone from January to June, 550 Palestinians, among them 105 teenagers, were arrested, and 225 sentenced to administrative detention without trial.

=== January ===
According to Shabak, 124 attacks which it defined as "terrorist" were carried out in January, including: 1 stabbing, 3 small arms shootings, 17 improvised explosive devices and 102 firebombs attacks. 17 Israelis were wounded (7 seriously or moderately).

In January, according to the Arab Group for Development and National Empowerment, an Arab Human Rights association, Israel detained over 400 Palestinians, on average 13 per day, of whom 57 were minors, and 18 women. According to B'Tselem, Israeli forces since late 2014 through to January 2015 have confirmed a shift to resorting more frequently to the use of live 0.22 inch caliber bullet fire from Ruger 10/22 rifles in West Bank clashes contrary to regulations that prohibit recourse to live fire against stone-throwers.

From Dec 30 to the 12 of January, according to OCHA, 42 Palestinians were injured in clashes with Israeli forces in the West Bank, 45% (19) being children, and 14 being hit with live ammunition. Over the same period, 5,554 olive saplings and trees were reported to have been vandalized by Israeli settlers. Israeli media reported 11 Palestinian attacks, 6 involving stone-throwing and 3 the hurling of Molotov cocktails, on settlers and other Israelis in both the West Bank and east Jerusalem. The Israeli military administration razed 27 Palestinian structures in Area C of the West Bank, while 5 more were demolished in East Jerusalem, with 2 more demolished by their Palestinian owners to avoid fines, all due to the lack of Israeli-issued building permits. From 13 to 19 January, 25 Palestinians, of whom 10 were children and 3 women, were injured in clashes across the West Bank, 40% during protests against the Separation Barrier in Bil'in, the closure of the road to Kafr Qaddum and the road connecting the villages of Surif and Jab'a in the Hebron Governorate. 3 incidents involving Palestinians stoning Israeli vehicles were recorded for the same period. Israeli forces fired 19 times in the same period in the direction of Palestinians found venturing into the Access Restricted Areas (ARA) of the Gaza Strip. From 20 to 26 January, 32 Palestinians, including eight children and two women, were injured in clashes, while Israeli authorities razed 41 Palestinian-owned structures in Area C of the West Bank, and four in East Jerusalem for lack of permits, displacing 81 Palestinians. In the same period there were 29 incidents involving Israeli naval and ground forces firing on Gazan fishing boats and Palestinians within the Strip in the Access Restricted Areas (ARA). From 27 January To 2 February, 41 Palestinians, inclusive of 7 children and 3 women were injured by Israeli forces in West Bank clashes. Three incidents of Palestinian stone-throwing occurred in East Jerusalem resulting in damage to 2 Israeli vehicles. According to the Israeli Security Agency Shin Bet, 124 incidents related to Palestinian violence, defined by the agency as 'terrorist attacks' took place over the same month: 115 took place in the West Bank, 18 in Jerusalem and 1 in Tel Aviv. Of these 102 incidents consisted of throwing Molotov cocktails and 17 of throwing improvised hand bombs. 3 incidents involved small arms gunfire, and one related to a stabbing assault.

- 1 January.
  - Israeli forces at a checkpoint opened fire on, and critically wounded, a Palestinian youth as he was about to cross the road near the Burin intersection south of Nablus in the northern West Bank. "An Israeli military spokeswoman said she was unfamiliar with the incident".
  - The IDF demolished the tents of five families, 29 people including 17-22 minors, on the eve of a forecast storm, in Khirbet Umn al-Hamal in the West Bank, leaving them homeless.
  - Some 79 Palestinian livelihoods were affected by the discovery that 5,000 2- to 3-year-old olive saplings had been cut down at Turmus Ayya village, near Ramallah.
- 2 January
  - 2 19-year-old Palestinian youths throwing stones at Israeli forces near Gaza's perimeter fence east of Jabalia were injured by IDF fire.
- 3 January
  - Jamal Numan, a fisherman from al-Shati refugee camp in the Gaza Strip, was critically wounded when an Israeli warship machine-gunned his fishing boat off Rafah. The vessel was destroyed. Israeli sources claimed it was close to the Egyptian border and engaged in smuggling. An Israeli military spokeswoman said that soldiers "called on suspects to halt and fired warning shots into the air", and "opened fire at the vessels after they "failed to comply". Poverty among Gaza's fishermen has increased 40% since 2008, when Israel placed strict limits to the waters where they may fish.
  - Two to three Palestinian shepherds, Falah Youssef Bani Jaber, Ahmad Bani Jaber, and Judeh Bani Jaber of Yanun/Aqraba suffered wounds, respectively to hands and stomach when they were attacked by settlers and then fired on by Israeli forces near the Israeli outpost of Gidonim, an extension of the Itamar settlement. The Palestinians claimed they were seeking restitution of their stolen herds. Israeli sources initially claimed they had fired in the air to quell a riot, and that the herds were later found, and had not been stolen. On 20 January, Israeli police arrested 2 members of Itamar, stating that the incident, in which a rapid-response team and the IDF were mobilized, arose from an alert by a settler shepherd that he was being attacked by 4 Palestinians. The four were arrested, and in the ensuing altercation, 2 Palestinians were hit by gunfire. Police later determined the initial report was false, and arrested the 2 Itamar settlers on suspicion they had shot the Palestinian shepherds.
- 4 January
  - Haytham Ziad Hijazi al-Rajabi (18) of Hebron was shot, according to Palestinian reports, in the foot during clashes with Israeli forces at the Jabal Juhur neighborhood by a security guard from the Israeli settlement of Kiryat Arba. The security coordinator said he fired after the children threw stones at the settlement.
- 5 January
  - Israeli authorities bulldozed several shops in the village of Husan in the West Bank, near Bethlehem, on the grounds they had not given permits for their construction.
  - The house, under construction, of Abd al-Rahim al-Jaabari in the Ein Bani Sleim area of eastern Hebron was razed to the ground by Israeli forces on the grounds that the structure was being erected without Israeli permission.
- 6 January
  - a Palestinian teenager Noor Muhammad Hamid Zaaqiq (19) was shot in the left foot, reportedly after returning from work at a gas station and was in front of his home, during an Israeli dawn raid to arrest and detain 6 people in the village of Beit Ummar.
- 8 January.
  - A 21-year-old ultra-orthodox yeshiva student was stabbed in the upper body by an assailant, using a screwdriver, while walking on Sultan Suleiman Street near the Damascus Gate. The assault is believed to be motivated by nationalist feelings, initial reports speaking of an Arab fleeing the scene. Police later arrested a 15-year-old Palestinian from East Jerusalem on suspicion of having caused the injury. Mohammad Hani Subhi Matouq was sentenced to 28 months in jail in mid June on two counts of stabbing.
  - The livelihoods of 10 Palestinian families in Qwawis and Ma'in (near Hebron) were affected when roughly 580 olive and almond trees were chopped down, reportedly by settlers.
- 9 January.
  - Settlers reportedly chopped down a grove of 45 olive trees belonging to Jibril and Khaled Muhammad Abu Arram at Shaab al-Butm, near Yatta, south of Hebron early in the morning.
  - Later that day, on Friday night, a follow-up attack, reportedly by settlers from Susiya, chopped down a further 300 trees belonging to the Shatat, Dawood, and Halabi families.
- 10 January.
  - 2 Palestinian youths from the village of Burin, Abbas Jamal Asous (18), shot with a live bullet in the thigh, and Muhammad Yasser Najjar (14), shot in the leg, were injured during clashes with Israeli forces.
  - A Palestinian youth, Ibrahim Issa Suleiman al-Tubassi (15), was shot in the thigh in the village of ar-Rihiya, south of Hebron, by a 'public security officer' for the Israeli settlement of Beit Hagai. According to OCHA, he fired with live ammunition on children playing in the snow near the settlement fence. According to an Israeli source, The Palestinians kids threw stones at the town entrance and head of security tried to move them away. Two days later, Israeli police arrested the Beit Hagai settler on suspicion that he had shot the youth.
  - A molotov cocktail was thrown at a car belonging to a Jewish settler guard at Silwan, East Jerusalem. The car was totally burnt. In several raids, Israeli police detained 7 local Palestinian youths, among them minors, on suspicion of involvement in the torching.
  - That Saturday night, a Palestinian girl, Rua Hazim Sawalha (12), was injured when the car she was travelling in was struck by rocks thrown near the Israeli settlement of Beit El, reportedly by settlers throwing stones at cars bearing white Palestinian number plates.
- 11 January.
  - According to Palestinian sources, settlers from Tapuach cut down from 35 to 170 ancient olive trees, called "Roman" for their age and size, in private Palestinian groves at Kfar Yusuf/Yasuf contiguous to the settlement.
- 12 January
  - Two Israeli settler women were injured when stones were thrown at their car near Sinjil.
- 13 January.
  - 3 children and one woman were reportedly injured during a search and arrest raid, one of 92 such raids between 13–19 January, on the village of Beit Ummar, which led to the arrest of 18 Palestinians, including 3 children.
  - Settlers, according to Palestinians reports from Shilo, reportedly vandalized Palestinian property near Turmus Ayya.
- 14 January.
  - Israeli forces arrested one Palestinian man and shot dead another, a 17 years old youth, from Yatta near the Gush Etzion Junction in the West Bank. Contrary to earlier reports they were terrorists, police said the two were suspected of trying to steal a car in the parking lot of the Rami Levy supermarket inside Gush Etzion. The dead youth was shot while attempting to flee on foot, with an Israeli police spokesperson later stating that while the man was being chased, a soldier fired thinking he might be an armed militant.
  - 2 sheep belonging to a Palestinian herder from Salim, Nablus were run over by a settler near Elon Moreh, deliberately according to the shepherd, accidentally according to Israeli police.
  - A bus carrying Israeli students was damaged by stoning near 'Anata Junction.
  - Israeli forces demolished 3 structures, an uninhabited house and 2 animal pens, belonging to the Maghayyir Al Dir Bedouin community near Ramallah, affecting the livelihoods of 19 people belonging to 3 families.
  - A residence being built in Deir Jarir by a registered refugee family of 4 was demolished for lack of a permit.
- 15 January
  - Israeli forces shot and wounded a Palestinian youth, Ahmad Jarbou (23), a worker in the Jenin hospital, during a raid, resulting in the arrest of 4 other youths, on Jenin refugee camp.
  - Sami al-Jaar (20) was shot during a police raid in Rahat conducted as part of a drug bust operation. Israel police spokesmen said they fired shots in the air when they came under attack from stone-throwers. According to the boy's father, a retired Arab Israeli policeman, he and his son came out to see what the noise was about, and when he observed police beating several youths with their weapons, he called on them to desist, a struggle ensued, he returned home, and subsequently, his son was sprayed with tear-gas and shot dead. According to Ma'an, he was standing on the family patio at the time. The father was arrested, and, according to his account, beaten up, suffering a broken arm, at the police station. According to Israeli police, they were brutally attacked. Leaders of Israel's Arab citizens declared a national strike from the Galilee to the Negev. Police are investigating whether the shot was fired by one of their men, or by townsfolk. An Israeli investigation led to the arrest of one of the policemen involved, after he had incriminated himself during an interrogation.
  - The Israeli military authority razed 7 acres of sown wheat at Khirbet an-Nahla on what was reportedly private Palestinian land, south of Bethlehem, claiming it was on state land and was earmarked for building a road to the settlement of Efrat.
  - Israel border troops used machine gun fire to drive off Palestinian farmers tending their lands on the outskirts of Khuza, al-Farahin and Al-Qarara, in eastern Khan Younis.
- 16 January
  - A 24-year-old Palestinian was shot in the foot by an Israel Border unit near the northeastern border of the Gaza Strip when Gazan Palestinians threw stones their way.
  - An Israeli settler was injured when his car was stoned near the Atarot junction.
  - The Israeli military authority razed 7 acres of sown wheat on what was reportedly private Palestinian land, south of Bethlehem, claiming it was on state land and was earmarked for building a road to the settlement of Efrat.
- 17 January
  - Israeli forces uprooted 185 saplings and razed a 250-metre retaining wall on 0.74 acres (3 dunums) of land between Al-Khader and Husan villages in the Bethlehem Governorate.
- 18 January
  - At 2:30 a.m. Israel soldiers, while arresting 'Ali Talji Ya'qub (21) in the Ya'qub family home at Beit Rima, beat both him and 3 relatives northwest of Ramallah. Entering the house, soldiers arrested, beating him and three of his relatives. His brother, Ya'qub Talji Ya'qub, (31) was dragged into the street and left unconscious, and was later diagnosed as suffering from neurogenic shock and respiratory distress.
  - According to Palestinian security forces, three Palestinian bakery workers, Nayif Muhammad Ali al-Shami, his brother Jihad al-Shami, and Muhammad Ali Ramadan, required hospital treatment after suffering injuries when Israeli forces beat them while conducting raids in Shuhada (Martyrs') Square in central Nablus, which is under full Palestinian administrative authority.
  - Sami Ibrahim Zayadna (45) died after inhaling fumes from a tear-gas cylinder fired at a crowd of mourners during a funeral ceremony in the Bedouin city of Rahat for Sami al-Jaar, shot dead some days earlier by Israeli forces during a drug-bust. Bedouin sources say the attack coincided with the beginning of a funeral eulogy. Israeli police stated that they fired after stones were thrown at them.
  - 12 olive trees in Asira al-Qibliya village and 21 in Al-Mughayyir, Ramallah were vandalized. The former attack was countersigned by a price tag graffito.
- 19 January
  - Muhammad Jamal Ghaith (16) sustained a deep gash to the head, reportedly from rifle butts to the head, and Israeli forces then arrested him outside his home in Silwan, East Jerusalem. After being detained at a local police station, he was taken to the Hadassah hospital for treatment. A Palestinian source describes the incident as an assault.
  - Two elderly Palestinian women, Zuheira Oweida Dandis ( 80), and Amal Dandis ( 52), were expelled from their home in central Hebron's Shuhada Street, which was then sealed. Israeli forces imposed the eviction from and sealing up of, the property, claiming it was necessary for security reasons. Israeli restrictions on Palestinian access to the street were imposed after Baruch Goldstein shot dead 29 Palestinians while they were at prayer in the nearby Ibrahimi Mosque, in 1994
  - A barracks serving as an animal shelter in Khallet al Wardeh (Hebron) was dismantled without notice, for lack of a permit, affecting 6 families' livelihoods (51 Palestinians).
  - Israeli authorities demolished 19 structures, 7 built with donor funds, belonging to Palestinians from the Qarzaliya area of Al Jiftlik Abu al 'Ajaj, in Jericho, including five residential structures, three kitchens and 11 animal shelters for 1,000 sheep. 29 people, of whom 14 children, were displaced as a result.
- 20 January
  - A Palestinian woman was injured by a rubber-coated bullet, and a youth was reportedly beaten up and then arrested during a dawn operation, when Israeli forces raided the al-Thahra neighborhood in al-Isawiya, East Jerusalem, and deployed to enable bulldozers to raze to the ground a house under construction belonging to Osama Ribhi Dari, for which he lacked an Israeli permit.
  - A 10-year-old Palestinian boy was shot in the leg with a rubber bullet during clashes with police during a protest against the erection of a flying checkpoint at at-Tur in East Jerusalem. Another youth, Udayy Hisham Abu al-Hawa (18), apparently walking in the area according to a Palestinian source, was arrested after being 'assaulted.'
  - Israeli bulldozers razed the home of Osama Ribhi Dari in Isawiya during a dawn raid. The reason given was that the construction lacked an Israeli permit, which Palestinians say are rarely given to them.
  - 6 Palestinian structures were demolished, including a water cistern, near Halhul, and two houses were razed in Ar Rifa'iyya (Hebron).
- January 21
  - During search and arrest-related clashes in Askar and Balata Refugee Camps (Nablus), 5 Palestinians, including an 11-year-old girl and a woman, suffered injuries.
  - Israeli passengers were stabbed in a Tel Aviv bus by Hamza Muhammad Hasan Matrouk (23) from the West Bank Nur Shams refugee camp of Tulkarm. 16 passengers were wounded, of them 4 seriously and 3 moderately. The terrorist was apprehended after being shot in the leg during a chase, nearby. In a confession to police, Matrouk stated that the motive for his attack lay in a response to Operation Protective Edge, recent tensions over who should control the Temple Mount and Islamic videos promising entry into paradise.
  - Atef Muhammad Baker (19) a Gaza fisherman was shot in the foot after an Israeli navy patrol fired at fishing boats off Gaza's northern coast. The Palestinians say they were fishing within the Israel-imposed limits. The Israeli spokesman stated that after the fisherman failed to heed warning shots for deviating from the designated zone, they opened fire.
  - Israeli forces razed the house of Ulayyan Jalal Rabaya in the Jabel Mukaber neighbourhood of East Jerusalem, which has 150 demolition orders pending. They reason given was that the owners lacked a building permit from the Israeli authorities, which, Palestinians say, are rarely given by Israel to them.
  - Israeli forces demolished a 4 apartment two storey building owned by the Bishara, Mukheimar and al-Mashni families in the Palestinian neighbourhood of Shuafat, East Jerusalem. According to Palestinians, they had secured initial approval, but the building was sealed under court order and eventually slated for demolition for security reasons. Fees for securing a license and the legal costs for appealing the demolitonj order ran to over $40,000.
- 22 January.
  - The Israeli military authority governing the West Bank demolished the 7 tent homes, recently resupplied by the International Committee of the Red Cross, of a five-family Palestinian community at Khirbet 'Ein Karzaliyah in the Jordan Valley, making them homeless for the third time since January 2014. The United Nations promptly denounced this and other measures, asserting they were 'illegal' noting 77 Palestinians, half of them children, had been left homeless as a result of demolitions in East Jerusalem and the West Bank in 3 days.
  - 6 Palestinian structures, 3 of them residential, were pulled down in Beit Iksa. The demolitions affected 3 registered refugee families consisting of 14 people, of whom 8 are children.
- January 23
  - Yamen Nabil Mahmoud (5) of Shufa was moderately injured when hit by an Israeli settler's car near Tulkarem.
  - At the weekly protest march in the village of Bil'in, Israeli forces shot local village activist Muhammad Adbi Abu Rahmeh in the head, with a rubber-coated bullet, while another villager Iyad Burnat was hit by a tear gas canister.
  - In one of 4 reported incidents against settlers for the week 20–26 January, two settlers, mother and daughter, were lightly injured by stone-throwing as they drove near Sinjil and the settlement of Ofra.
  - 5 Palestinians were reportedly assaulted by Israeli forces in Susiya (Hebron), and a further 4 arrested, apparently when separating settlers and Palestinians, when the former, according to Palestinian sources, tried to impede a tree-planting event on privately owned land.
- January 24
  - An Israeli pillbox guarding the Israeli settlement of Beit El was set afire by Palestinian youths, who hurled improvised pipe bombs at it
  - A settler man was injured from Palestinian stone-throwing near Beit Hanina (East Jerusalem).
  - A Palestinian man cultivating his farmland at Khirbet an-Nahla village (Bethlehem) was hot with live ammunition by an Israeli settler.
  - Israeli settlers reportedly kidnapped, after spraying him with a chemical, a Palestinian villager from Sa'ir (Hebron Governorate), when he was waiting on Road 60. He was beaten up, and left on the same road later, and taken to hospital by locals.
- January 25
  - Saad Addin Samir Abu Sneina, (20) of at-Tur in East Jerusalem was shot in the head (eyebrow) by a rubber-coated bullet fired at close range by an Israeli soldier, reportedly while emerging from his home.
  - Over 30 trees belonging to an elderly Palestinian, Khalil Najawaa, of Susya, were chopped down. A local spokesman said settlers had been pressuring him to leave the area.
  - According to a Palestinian report, 10-year-old Muhammad Afeef Khweis was arrested by Israeli police in a park in the at-Tur neighborhood of East Jerusalem. His uncle was also arrested after being sprayed with pepper. The family complained of being assaulted.
  - A Palestinian man reported that settlers had smashed his rear window and tried to stab him, near Silat ad-Dhahr (Jenin Governorate), and fled when other Palestinians arrived.
- 27 January
  - Basim Zakariyya Suleiman (16) was shot in the foot during clashes with Israeli forces responding to stone-throwing from dozens of Palestinian youths in Balata and Askar refugee camps after 15 military vehicles escorted ultra-orthodox Jews and settlers in a visit to Joseph's Tomb in Nablus at 2:30 a.m. According to Palestinian sources, the visit was not coordinated, but the IDF had informed officials they would be conducting military operations inside Nablus.
  - Israel forces shot and wounded 3 villagers during a protest demonstration at Al-Ram against the closure of the main entrance to the village.
  - Child Rights Information Network issued a report on conditions facing the 700 Palestinian children arrested by Israeli forces each year, claiming their mistreatment in detention was systematic.
  - Israel confiscated hundreds of dunams of agricultural land at Beit Ula, claiming it was 'state land'. A local community leader said the land was owned by several families from Beit Ula who had farmed it since the Ottoman period.
- 28 January
  - According to his family, Ibrahim Gheith (14) of at-Tur, East Jerusalem, was beaten up while walking to school, after a car driven by local settlers stopped and one person assaulted him and tried to drag him into the vehicle. The boy was taken for treatment to the Shaare Zedek Medical Center in West Jerusalem.
  - A Palestinian teenager from the village of Tayasir east of Tubas was injured lightly when abandoned Israeli ordnance in a field, declared by Israel a closed military zone, blew up as he was grazing his sheep near Ein al Hilwa. He required hospitalization.
  - Near Tammun (Tubas), Israeli authorities confiscated a water tank and agricultural vehicle from the Palestinian Ministry of Agriculture deployed for a tree-planting project.
- 29 January
  - Israeli forces demolished the house and mobile home, donor-funded, of Ahmad Jamal al-Jiyawi at Khirbet al-Ras, west of Idhna, as well the barn of another in the town of Idhna in the southern West Bank, resulting in the displacement of a family of 7, 5 of whom children, while 55 others were affected.
  - Israeli forces demolished a large cow barn, also west of Idhna, belonging to a farmer, Mahmoud Musallam Abu Ijeheisha, whose family has 10 dependent members, mostly children.
  - Israeli forces destroyed a 2,000 meter-long water pipeline near the village of al-Atuf, feeding the water network of nearby Palestinian villages and Bedouin encampments in the northern Jordan Valley on the West Bank. In a separate operation, 250–300 meters of water-piping, provided by the Palestinian Authority with foreign donor funds, was confiscated near Yarza, east of Tubas, intended to link up the village to the Tubas water-network. The confiscationb affected the livelihoods of 86 people.
  - 2 Palestinians from Gaza, reportedly armed with grenades, knives and a screwdriver, were detained in the Eshkol Regional Council zone after illegally entering Israel.
  - A Palestinian car parked in the H2 zone of Hebron was vandalized, apparently by settlers.
- January 30
  - Muhammad Bilal al-Tamimi (15) was shot and wounded in the thigh by live ammunition fired by Israeli forces during a protest march at Nabi Salih regarding Israeli violations against Palestinian children. In a similar protest march on behalf of Palestinian minors' rights in Bil'in, one demonstrator was struck by a tear gas canister.
  - Settlers from Ma'on cut down two trees at the Palestinian village of At-Tuwani.
- January 31
  - Ahmed Ibrahim Jaber al-Najjar (19) was shot dead by Israeli troops either as he and other youth were about to throw fire bombs and were sighted by a Golani unit lying in ambush, or after a group of Palestinians threw Molotov cocktails at settler cars near the village of Burin and the Israeli outpost of Havat Gilad. Another involved youth was shot in the leg after a short manhunt. Settler leader Gershon Mesika blessed the soldiers for responding appropriately to terrorism.
  - A large group of Israeli settlers near the Israeli settlement of Beit El threw rocks at Palestinian cars driving on the Ramallah-Nablus road. According to local eyewitnesses, Israeli troops nearby did not intervene and several vehicles were damaged.
- Undated. Sometime during the week between 26 January-2 February.
  - Israeli authorities razed a dunum of land, destroying 30 olive trees in the process, in the areas of two Palestinian villages, Azzun Atma and Beit Amin villages (Qalqilya Governorate), in order to lay down water infrastructure for the Israeli settlement of Sha'arei Tikva.
  - In the area of Masafer Yatta, Hebron Masafer area between the Palestinian communities of Jinba Mirkez, Halaweh, Khirbet al-Fakheit and Khirbet al Majaz, Israeli authorities levelled around 800 dunums of land sown with wheat and barley for grazing. No explanation, apparently, has been forthcoming.

=== February ===
In the week from the 3rd to the 9th of February, 36 West Bank Palestinians, inclusive of 9 children, sustained injuries from Israeli forces. 6 were casualties of live ammunition fire. Israel conducted 96 search and arrest operations over the same period. Israeli media reported 11 instances of Palestinians throwing stones or Molotov cocktails at settlers' cars or property, mostly in East Jerusalem. Israeli tanks and bulldozers twice breached Gaza territory, northeast of Khan Younis and east of Rafah, and conducted a ground-leveling operation. In the week from 10 to 16 February, 30 Palestinians, including 9 children were injured in clashes with Israeli forces in the West Bank. Six adults and 4 children were reportedly shot with live ammunition. Over the week 17-23, one Palestinian was killed and 24 were injured in clashes with Israeli forces, which conducted 90 search and arrest operations, making 102 arrests, bringing to 899 the number of Palestinians detained since January 1. 3 incidents of Palestinians assaulting Israelis took place over the same period. Over the period 24 February–March 2, 64 Palestinians were injured in clashes with Israeli forces, while Palestinians targeted Israeli settlers and property on 7 occasions.

- I February
  - Raed Jihad Abu Rmeila (28), a photographer for the Israeli Human Rights NGO B'Tselem, was run over by a settler's car as he walked, according to his testimony, on the pedestrian strip to work near the Ibrahimi mosque in Hebron.
- 2 February
  - Israeli forces bulldozed two small farmhouses, a water well, and 500 metres of traditional stone-walling belonging to Anwar and Akram Tayseer, two brothers, in the village of Qusra, near the Israeli outpost of Esh Kodesh in the Nablus Governorate. The structures were built with funds donated by the French government. The livelihoods of 10 families, 61 people, were affected.
  - Muhammad Yusuf Burqan (17), a teenage shepherd, was reportedly shot by a settler while tending a flock of sheep in the Wadi Yasul area of Silwan, East Jerusalem.
  - Seven Palestinian Authority security officers were injured when a settler's car crashed into their vehicle near the Al-Arroub refugee camp in the Hebron Governorate. They sustained light to moderate injuries.
- 4 February
  - Israeli forces raided a Palestinian high school near the villages of al-Lubban and As-Sawiya, firing sound bombs and reportedly forcing students to leave at gunpoint while detaining the principal and his assistant for interrogation concerning reports from local settlers that students had thrown stones at vehicles in the area.
  - An Israeli woman settler near Beit Hanina was injured by glass from Palestinians throwing stones.
  - Israeli authorities served Silwad residents Nasser Issa, Yasser Salim, Bassel al-Tawil, and Muhammad Saleh with a demolition order for wells on their land used to draw water for agricultural purposes.
  - Mahmoud Dawoud Abu al-Hawa (10) was arrested by Israeli police in front of his home in at-Tur, East Jerusalem. Release of the child would be secured by paying $195 at the local police station, the parents were informed.
  - A 13-year-old boy was injured after coming across unexploded Israeli ordnance near the village of Jayyous in the Qalqilya Governorate.
- 5 February
  - A group of Israeli settlers established a new illegal settlement, consisting of movable houses and water tanks, by fencing off an area in the Jabal Subeih zone skirting the Palestinian village of Beita.
  - 6 trees on privately owned Palestinian land in Kafr Qaddum in the Qalqilya Governorate were found chemically burnt, reportedly by settlers from Qedumin.
  - An Israeli settler vehicle ran over a 5-year-old Palestinian boy, Hamza al-Haymouni, at Beit Khalil, in what Palestinian sources interpreted as a hit-and-run incident in the H2 area, causing serious injuries. Another 5-year-old boy Jamil al-Jaabari, sustained minor injuries in a similar incident involving a settler's car in southern Hebron city.
- 6 February
  - A Palestinian man was shot in the lower limbs by Israeli soldiers in Hebron after reportedly trying to wrest a gun from a soldier near Kiryat Arba.
  - According to Palestinian reports, settlers from Karmei Tzur shot live fire towards demonstrators at a protest held near Beit Ummar. No injuries were sustained.
  - 21 Palestinians engaged in a weekly protest demonstration against the closure of the entrance to Kafr Qaddum village (Qalqilya Governorate) were injured as the result of Israeli crowd control and dispersal actions.
  - Two 15-year-old Palestinians in the vicinity of the settlement of Ma'on were reportedly beaten, and then detained overnight, after settlers complained that they were grazing their sheep on land the settlement is planning to expand into.
- 7 February
  - According to Palestinian reports, several Palestinian cars, in proximity to the village of Aqraba, were fired on by an Israeli settler.
  - The Palestinian Environment Quality Authority, in response to growing concerns at the dumping of Israeli toxic products on Palestinian territory, with a recent case of Israeli asbestos being dumped near Tulkarem, stated that those convicted of complicity in the crime would face a sentence of lifetime imprisonment and hard labor. Local Palestinian collusion has been suspected in a number of cases.
  - Israeli settlers established 5 mobile homes on the Jabal Abu al-Rakha and Jabal Kweik sectors of Jalud village, which is located between the illegal outposts of Adei Ad and Esh Kodesh.
- 8 February
  - Israeli special forces reportedly infiltrated the Gaza Strip, and shot and wounded a 21-year-old Palestinian working on agricultural land east of al-Maghezi Refugee Camp, and some 300 metres from the Israel–Gaza barrier. He man remained in Israeli detention.
  - An undergraduate student, Muhammad Osama Suleiman, according to Palestinian reports, was assaulted by Israeli soldiers while walking home to the village of Ajjah near Jenin. He was accused of throwing stones at the military vehicles and suffered bruises to his head and back.
  - Settlers reportedly destroyed a plantation of some 70 tree saplings, donated by the YMCA and planted a week earlier, on land of the Sa'ir village, which under an annexation threat and near to the Israeli settlement of Asfar.
- 9 February
  - Israeli authorities demolished an agricultural irrigation pool near Jericho, funded by the Palestinian Ministry of Agriculture, on the grounds it lacked an Israeli permit.
- 10 February
  - Israeli forces razed to the ground the house of Ahmad Mamun al-Abbasi, home to his 14-member family in Silwan, East Jerusalem. The demolition took place just after its construction, begun in February 2014, had been completed, and the family had taken up residence.
- 11 February
  - Israel gave seizure notices it would confiscate for Jewish settlement 500 acres of reportedly private Palestinian land belonging to the al-Halayqa, Rasna, and al-Hasasna families, at Ash-Shuyukh, 6 miles northeast of Hebron.
  - The Abu Sbitan family warehouse at at-Tur in East Jerusalem, used for stone storage, was raided by Israeli police and its materials, including supplementary electrical equipment, were reportedly confiscated. The move is seen to be preliminary to the demolition of the site structures, built 5 years earlier on the family property.
- 13 February
  - A Palestinian teenager, Jamil Shtewi (17), was reportedly shot in the leg with a live bullet as a weekly protest march took place in Kafr Qaddum, The demonstration was quelled by the use of tear gas and rubber-bullets.
  - 16 Palestinians were injured in clashes with Israeli forces at al-Eizariya.
- 14 February
  - Imad Suleiman al-Khawli (20) suffered a critical brain injury when shot with live fire by Israeli soldiers, while he participated in a protest rally against the closure of exits to the village of Azzun (Qalqilya Governorate).
- 17 February
  - Israeli forces bulldozed dozens of olive trees belonging to Adnan Daraghmah at Safayih, on the edge of the Palestinian village of Tayasir, stating that the area was encompassed by an Israeli closed military zone, and that the owner had not obtained permission to plant them from the Israeli military administration.
  - According to Palestinians sources, Thaer Mahmoud Issa Daoud (37) was beaten with an iron rod by settlers, in the village of Jalud, near the Israeli outpost of Esh Kodesh and suffered injuries to the head.
  - 3 Palestinian children, ranging in age from 2 to 13, were injured when Explosive Remnants of War (ERW) blew up inside their home, to the west of Jabalia.
  - Adele Biton age 4 died from respiratory complications resulting from a traumatic brain injury after a barrage of rocks were thrown by Palestinians at the car she was travelling in. Her two siblings ages 4 and 5 were also wounded in the attack.
- 18 February
  - Settlers, reportedly from Metzad, uprooted 500 saplings recently planted by the al-Ayayda family at Ash-Shuyukh in the Hebron Governorate.
  - A molotov cocktail was thrown at an Israeli settler compound in Sheikh Jarrah in East Jerusalem.
  - Stones were thrown at an Israeli vehicle near Al ‘Arrub Refugee Camp.
- 19 February 1000 olive saplings planted in a schoolyard in Tel Rumeida and donated by a Jordanian NGO were reportedly uprooted by settlers.
- 21 February
  - Israeli settlers chopped down over 35 olive trees belonging to the Abed Rabbu family in the Wadi al-Sweid area of southern Hebron.
- 22 February
  - Abraham Goldstein, an ultra-Orthodox Jewish man was stabbed in the stomach by a Palestinian teenager, Mahmoud Abu Aosba, (18) from Birzeit. The incident occurred in Safra Square in Jerusalem. The boy was arrested by an armed guard and Jerusalem Mayor Nir Barkat.
  - 7 Palestinians youths suffered wounds to their lower limbs during a raid by Israeli forces on the Aida refugee camp, when live ammunition was used. OCHA reports the total number of casualties as 11, including a child, 4 adults and 5 others, including a pregnant woman, due to physical assault. Two, Ali Adwan and Issa Sami Abu Srour, were hit by live fire, while a third, Mohammad Omar Badawneh, was shot twice in the thighs. A child was hit by live ammunition in the leg during a similar operation at Al Jalazun Refugee Camp. 5 settler attacks on persons and property were recorded.
- 23 February
  - An Israeli vehicle driving near the settlement of Karmei Tzur came under fire, reportedly from Palestinian gunmen. The driver, a Palestinian Israeli, was not injured. Preliminary reports suggest the shooting related to a work dispute between the Palestinian Israeli and his local employees.
  - Israeli forces shot and arrested a Gazan as he approached the perimeter fence north of Beit Lahia.
- 24 February
  - 19-year-old Jihad Shehada al-Jaafari, (19) was shot dead by Israeli forces during a dawn raid on Dheisha refugee camp, near Bethlehem. An Israeli spokesman said that, on failing to disperse a crowd when rocks were thrown, wounding one soldier lightly, the soldiers felt in danger and shot the leader of the rioters. The boy bled to death on the roof of his home. Palestinians say the Israelis blocked ambulances going to the home. An autopsy suggested he had been shot at close range.
  - A Palestinian girl, Mariam Karim Dana (10) suffered fractures after a settler guard jeep hit her in Silwan's Ein al-Lawza area in East Jerusalem. The driver was not detained.
  - Palestinians were deemed responsible for an arson attack on a Jewish cemetery in East Jerusalem.
- 25 February
  - After daubing a mosque's walls with slogans such as "we want the redemption of Zion", "revenge" alongside a Jewish Star of David, Jewish settlers reportedly set fire to a mosque in Jab'a near Bethlehem. The incident took place on the 21st anniversary of the Ibrahimi Mosque massacre in Hebron. It is not known whether the incident constitutes a price tag attack or not.
  - Settlers reportedly vandalized a Palestinian souvenir shop in Hebron, near the Ibrahimi Mosque, and physically assaulted three people there.
- 26 February
  - An arson attack on a Greek Orthodox seminary for the study of Christianity next to Jaffa Gate in Jerusalem destroyed the bathroom. The walls were smeared with graffiti, including "Jesus is a son of a b***h", and "the Redemption of Zion"
  - 25 Palestinians were injured in Azzun, Qalqilya Governorate, when Israeli forces clashed with protestors demonstrating against the closure of the eastern entrance to the village, a policy imposed in 2001.
- 27 February
  - 3 Palestinians, Abd al-Majid Amro, Issa Mahmoud Amro, and Anas Amro, were reportedly injured by live fire when Israeli forces moved to put down a demonstration to have Shuhada street reopened for public access in Hebron's Old City.
- Undated
  - Approximately 260 olive saplings in Qwawis, near Hebron were reportedly uprooted by settlers, bringing the figure for trees damaged or uprooted by settlers in the West Bank in the first three month of 2015 to 6840.

=== March ===
Over the week 3–9 March, 31 episodes involving Israeli naval boats firing at Gaza fishing boats close to the 6 nautical miles limit imposed by Israel were recorded, with one fatality and six arrests. 43 Palestinians were injured in clashes with Israeli forces in the West Bank. Four incidents, one involving a car running into 5 Israelis, and 3 involving stone-and Molotov cocktail throwing, were registered for the same period. Two people were injured and some cars damaged in the latter cases. 80 search and arrest operations were conducted by Israel, resulting in the arrests of 120 Palestinians. 6 settler attacks occurred, Six Israeli settler attacks resulting in Palestinian injuries or property damage were recorded, including the physical assault of a 15-year-old girl in Hebron and an elderly man in Jerusalem. 21 Palestinian structures were demolished in Area C for lack of Israeli building permits. Between 10–16 March, in clashes with Israeli forced 42 Palestinians, 13 of them children, were injured across the West Bank, mostly in response to stone-throwing. 44%, or 18 of the injuries, including 9 children, were shot with live ammunition. Over the same week Israeli forces fired 'warning' fire into Gaza's Access Restricted Areas (ARA) on 23 occasions. The IDF made one incursion, to level ground, into Gaza, near the Maghazi Refugee camp. Settlers attacked Palestinians or damaged their property on 7 occasions. 3 incidents of Palestinian stone-throwing were recorded: one Israeli woman was injured, and two buses damaged.30 Palestinian structures were demolished in the West Bank, 22 in Area C and 8 in Jerusalem, for lack of Israeli building permission Of these 13 were residences, leaving 78 people homeless. Between 17–23 March, 21 Palestinians, including 7 children, were injured in clashes with Israeli forces. Israel fired warning shots 21 times at sea and land into Access Restricted Areas in the Gaza Strip. In 86 search and arrest operations 93 Palestinians were arrested in the West Bank. In Area C of the West Bank, 30 Palestinian structures were razed for lack of Israeli permits, 27 belonging to the herding communities of Al Mak-hul and Al Hadidiya in the northern Jordan Valley, and 3 at Abu Dis, as part of an Israeli plan to forcibly relocate 46 communities. 492 trees and saplings on the West Bank village lands of Majdal Bani Fadil (Nablus), Biddya (Salfit) and ad-Dhahiriya (Hebron) were uprooted by Israeli forces, claiming they were planted on Israeli state lands. Israeli settlers attacked Palestinians 4 times, resulting in Palestinian injuries or property damage, which 2 Palestinian stone throwing incidents in East Jerusalem, one on a bus and another on settler housing injured 4 Israelis, including 2 children. Between 34 March–April 2, 64 Palestinians, including five children, which injured during clashes with Israeli forces. Israel conducted 110 search and arrest operations, arresting 132 Palestinians in the West Bank. 3 Palestinian attacks took place in East Jerusalem, on injuring a 4-year-old Israeli child from stone throwing. Two of the incidents took place in Beit Hanina and Silwan respectively

- 1 March
  - Two young Palestinians were shot with live ammunition when Israeli forces raided Duheisha refugee camp. An Israeli spokeswoman stated that one was hurt in the legs, and another slightly wounded, by.22 caliber rounds, in response to Palestinians throwing one grenade.
  - Two Palestinian brothers, aged 21 and 17, were injured by the explosion of abandoned Israeli ordnance while shoveling sand from the ruins of a destroyed house in Al Shouka, east of Rafah. 7000 pieces of such ordnance are said by the UN to lie in the rubble of the Strip.
- 2 March
  - After a video clip, taken in December 2014, was loaded by former MK Ben Ari onto the internet showing Israeli police siccing on a dog to attack a Palestinian teenager, Hamza Abu Hashem (16), who had been caught throwing stones, the IDF undertook to cease the practice of employing dogs to arrest demonstrators. Ben Ari said it would 'teach terrorists a lesson'. The boy has since been sentenced to 18 months imprisonment for terrorist activities.
- 3 March
  - Two Palestinians were injured during clashes when Israeli forces in 30 military vehicles conducted a dawn raId on the village of Qabatiya, near Jenin. Muhammad Ali Hithnawi (20) was shot in the foot. Noah Fadel Zakarna (21) was also hospitalized after inhaling gas from tear-gas canisters.
  - Israeli police deployed 14 tractors to raze 25,000 dunums (roughly 6,000 acres) of wheat, barley and other crops in the Palestinian Bedouin village of Rakhama.
- 5 March
  - Two cars were torched, and price-tag graffiti in Hebrew ( "Death to Arabs" and "Glory to the Jews") were sprayed on walls, in the village of Mughayyir. Locals suspect that Adei Ad settlers are responsible.
  - In the fourth incident in several days involving naval fire on fishing boats from Gaza in the Mediterranean, two Gazan fishermen, Eid Muhsin Bakr and Ziad Fahd Bakr, were wounded by live fire by Israeli patrol boats in waters west of the al-Sudaniyya neighborhood. Both men were taken to Al-Shifa Hospital, and one was reportedly in a serious condition. 3 other fishermen were arrested.
- 6 March
  - A Palestinian from Ras al-Amud in East Jerusalem, Mohammad Salima (21), plowed his car into several Israeli women Border police officers and then ran over a 51-year-old bicyclist, at a light rail station further on. The attack was apparently in response to rumours in social media that Muslims had been attacked on the Haram al-Sharif and had been planned for a week. Seven sustained injuries, 4 lightly, and two were moderately injured. The attack, according to The Times of Israel, broke a spell of quiet that had lasted several months. The incident took place on Shimon Hatzadik Street, on the line separating West and East Jerusalem. It was the 5th such attack in the last year. He was shot and seriously wounded. He was found to be bearing a cleaver, which he reportedly wielded as he emerged from his car. Two Palestinian factions, The Popular Resistance Committee and Hamas, praised the attack.
  - Several Jewish graves on the Mount of Olives were desecrated. The perpetrators' identity is unknown.
  - An Israeli car was damaged by a firebomb in the evening in Wadi al-Joz in East Jerusalem.
- 7 March.
  - Mustafa Ballut (20) of Jenin, and Yousuf Abd al-Karim Abu Naasah (19) from Jenin refugee camp, were wounded when Israeli forces fired on a car near the al-Jalama checkpoint they deemed suspicious. The former suffered serious wounds and was hospitalized in Afula. The latter's wounds were described as moderate.
  - Israeli naval forces shot dead a Palestinian fisherman, Tawfiq Abu Riyala after "warning shots were fired towards the engines of the vessels", arrested two others and confiscated two boats, after four vessels were said to have deviated from the Israeli demarcation line in waters off Gaza City.
  - Anas Yahya Abdeen (7) was reportedly shot in the arm by a rubber-coated bullet while watching from the balcony as Israeli forces raided the house of Abd al-Razeq al-Salayma, opposite his own, in the Ras al-Amud neighborhood in East Jerusalem. In a separate incident, a young Palestinian was shot in the forehead with similar munitions during clashes in the Ein al-Luza area of Silwan.
  - 5 Palestinian teenagers were shot with Israeli 0.22 caliber bullets during clashes, involving rock-and bottle throwing, near the al-Jalazone refugee camp, north of Ramallah. One sustained serious injuries when he was shot twice in the chest. Another bullet struck a youth in the mouth, while the remaining three were shot in the lower limbs.
  - Two Palestinians, reportedly bystanders aged 9 and 11, were shot and injured by PA forces pursuing a fugitive in Balata Refugee Camp in Nablus. The wounds were minor.
  - An elderly man from Silwan by the name of Al-Qaq (63) was reportedly beaten up, while walking home, by a group of what a Palestinian source called settlers, in the Harat al-Sharaf square in the Old City.
- 9 March
  - 300 olive trees belonging to residents of the Palestinian village of Salim, near Nablus were bulldozed by Israeli forces two days after the Nablus District Civil Liaison Office had placed a request to allow Palestinian farmers to access their land for ploughing. The fields are contiguous to the illegal Israeli outpost of Havat Skali.
  - The two story home of Kifah Abd al-Rahim Sholi in the village of al-Jarushiyya in the Tulkarm Governorate of the West Bank, a judge of the Palestinian judiciary, was demolished by Israeli forces. The grounds for razing it to the ground were that it lacked an Israeli permit.
  - Settlers reportedly cut down some 40-70 olive trees in Burin village, on the property of Ahmad Abd al-Fattah Khalifa.
- 10 March
  - Bulldozers and excavators under military escort razed stone walls, store houses, livestock barns and levelled dirt roads used by Palestinians to access their farms in the town of Isawiya, East Jerusalem. Israel has apparently designated the area as a parkland.
  - The Palestinian Red Crescent reported that 9 Palestinians were hit in the lower limbs by live fire during a protest at Israeli bulldozing of land in the Qalandiya airport area, near the village of Kafr 'Aqab. One man was reportedly in critical condition, while dozens were reportedly hit by rubber bullets.
- 11 March
  - A 650-square metre Palestinian stone factory owned by Jabir Awad Qabaha was razed by Israeli forces in Bartaa al-Sharqiyya. The structure had been recently completed and was due to be operative shortly.
  - Israel forces bulldozed livestock pens belonging to Walid Matar Abu Kbash in the village of Zabda west of Jenin, on the grounds that they lacked Israeli authorization.
- 13 March
  - Two Palestinians, Ahmad Daas (10) and Mahmoud Gazi (30) were reportedly wounded by live fire, and a photojournalist, Akram Darawsheh, was injured by rubber-coated bullets during the weekly protest march in Kafr Qaddum.
  - 11 Palestinians were injured when Israeli forces clashes with a protest group of 200 people in Nabi Salih. 3activists were also reportedly detained. One, reportedly throwing a Molotov cocktail, was shot by live ammunition in the leg. Seven activists were reportedly struck with rifle butts, and 3 children were among the injured. One girl, Marah Naji Tamimi, required treatment at the Yasser Arafat Hospital in Salfit after being hit by a rifle butt. An Israel spokesperson said they dispersed a violent riot.
- 14 March
  - A settler from the unauthorized Israeli outpost of Mitzpe Yair settlement reportedly assaulted with a sharp object Hani Badawi al-Dababseh (24) near Yatta, causing extensive body bruising and a head injury.
- 15 March
  - The Wisdam Nassar family of Madama, south of Nablus, complained that goods and savings to the value of $4,200 were missing from their home after it was ransacked by IDF troops during an overnight inspection raid. Palestinian sources state that some $2.9 million was confiscated during similar search operations in Palestinian homes during Operation Brother's Keeper in mid-2014.
- 18 March
  - In suppressing a protest against the construction of a wall between the al-Jalazun refugee camp and the Israeli settlement of Beit El, Israeli forces shot 4 Palestinians with live ammunition, and a further 5 were injured by rubber bullets. Ali Mahmoud Safi (20) was in a serious condition after being shot in the chest by a 0.22 bullet. An Israeli spokesman identified him as the key instigator of rock-throwing from a rioting crowd of 50 youths, and he was shot for that reason. Safi died of his wound on 25 March.
  - Bulldozers accompanied by IDF military vehicles reportedly destroyed 300 olive trees in groves belonging to Maher Abd al-Raouf Khatib and Bashar Abdullah Ahmad in the Palestinian village of Majdal Bani Fadil. 5,000 meters of stone-walling were also razed. The village is surrounded by Israeli settlements, and an Israeli spokesman stated that not "uprooting" took place, but the terracing in the area was demolished because it lacked Israeli permits on what the Israeli Defence Ministry's Civil Administration defines as state lands.
- 19 March
  - Settlers, reportedly from the Israeli outpost of Adei Ad, uprooted some 60 olive trees from a grove belonging to Hajj Mahmoud al-Araj in Turmus Ayya.
- 20 March
  - 2 Gazan Palestinians of Abasan al-Kabira, east of Khan Yunis, were moderately injured after being shot in their lower limbs by Israeli forces near the border with Israel.
- 21 March
  - Masked settlers "allegedly" threw stones at two Palestinian girls in At-Tuwani while they were gathering herbs for their family's livestock, in the vicinity of the illegal Israeli outpost of Ma'on, Har Hebron. One, 6 years old, "lightly wounded from stone that hit her head". She was treated by an IDF doctor, her "family lodged a complaint with police and authorities in the region were searching for the suspects".
- 25 March
  - During clashes after an Israeli raid on the Shuafat Refugee camp in East Jerusalem, 3 Palestinians were injured by the firing of rubber-coated steel bullets. Two were wounded in the lower limbs, and a third in the head.
- 27 March
  - Israeli forces put down a weekly demonstration at Kafr Qaddum. Bulldozers demolished the village's main water-line.4 Palestinians were injured by rubber-coated steel bullets Nasser Barham (42) was shot in the stomach; Hakam Khaldun (24) was hit in the lower abdomen; Maher Jumaa (45) was wounded in the foot; Muhammad Abd al-Salam (18) was shot in the head.
  - In a separate incident 4 activists taking part in a weekly protest march, one of whom was an Icelander, suffered injuries, and a child was taken into custody, in clashes with Israeli forces at Bil'in.Ratib Abu Rahma (50) was shot in the back; Ismail Mohammad Abu Rahma(18), Ellan Shalif (78), and the Icelandic activist (27) were wounded in their lower limbs.
- March 28
  - Israeli settlers, reportedly from the Israeli settlement of Asfar-Metzad, took away 1,100 olive trees and uprooted a further 100, all belonging to Muhammad Abu Shanab al-Ayaydah and the heirs of Abd al-Qader Abu Shanab al-Ayaydah and Mousa Abu Shanab al-Ayayadah, near Ash-Shuyukh and the Israeli outpost of outpost of Pnei Kedem north of Hebron.
- March 30
  - In two separate incidents, 3 Palestinians were shot and moderately injured by Israeli forces east of Khan Yunis. An Israeli spokesman stated that one Israeli forces responded to a riot, referring to a rock-throwing and tire-burning incident coinciding with Land Day.
- March 31
  - Israeli forces demolished the foundations of three apartments under construction in the Jabel Mukaber quarter of East Jerusalem, for lacking Israeli permits.

Undated

  - A fifteen-year-old Palestinian girl was assaulted in Hebron.
  - Between 10–16 March two Palestinian men, respectively in Hebron and East Jerusalem, were physically assaulted and 72 olive trees in At-Tuwani (Hebron) and Al-Khader (Bethlehem) were uprooted. 4 Palestinian cars and several water tanks were vandalized.
  - Between 17–23 March an 8-year-old child suffered a serious eye injury after being butted in the head by a soldier's rifle, close to clashes in Al-Khader.

=== April ===
In the 2 weeks from March 31 to April 31, 117 Palestinians in clashes, mostly protest marches, involving stone throwing:14 from live fire, including 4 children. On 36 occasions Israeli forces fired on Gazan civilians near the perimeter fence or at sea. Gazan militants fired twice at Israeli communities over the border. 147 search-and-arrest operations were conducted, and 197 Palestinians arrested. 9 Palestinian structures were demolished in East Jerusalem for lack of Israeli permits.4 attacks by settlers were registered, injuring two 11- and 16-year-old girls, while 5 Palestinian attacks on settlers or their property were reported, 4 settlers being injured as a result of stone-throwing at buses. 31 Palestinians, including 12 children, were injured in clashes with Israeli forces from 14 to 21 April. Half of the incidents involved stone-throwing. Israeli forces fired warning fire on 22 occasions into the Gaza Strip and its coastal waters. I Israeli man was killed, and a woman injured, in a traffic incident described by Israeli sources as deliberate and by Palestinian sources as accidental. 2 attacks by settlers were reported. 8 solar panels donated by an international NGO for two Bedouin houses in Khan al Ahmar Abu al Helu, Jerusalem, were dismantled and confiscated by Israeli authorities. From 21 to 27 April, 49 Palestinians,(of whom 11 were children and 4 women) were injured by Israeli forces in various, mainly stone-throwing clashes. On 18 occasions Israel fired towards at Palestinians in the Access Restricted Areas (ARA) of the Gaza Strip. On two occasions a farmer and a 17-year-old boy were wounded. I settler was injured while on a bus, at At Tur, from stone-throwing. One settler's car was damaged by a Molotov cocktail near Beit Ur al-Tahta (Ramallah).

- April 1
  - Ahmad Salim al-Nurasi (22) was shot with live fire in the leg during an Israeli raid on the Jenin refugee camp.
  - A child was reportedly beaten and left unconscious when Israeli forces raided Jahalin Bedouin tribe encampments at Abu Dis, and confiscated 12 portable solar panels 9 of which were donated to the community by a Palestinian NGO, the Applied Research Institute Jerusalem. The panels are the only source of electricity for the tribe.
- April 2
  - IDF paratrooper commander, Yoav Leitman, was stabbed with a knife in the torso while confronting a group of Palestinians trying to enter Israel illegally near Oranit, sustaining light wounds.
  - Officials of the environmental protection agency of the Military administration of the West Bank uprooted 120 olive trees belonging to members of the Mansour family in Wadi Qana, inside an Israeli settlement bloc, near Salfit.
  - Palestinians reported that Zakariya Julani (13) from the Shuafat Refugee Camp was shot in the eye by an Israeli Border policewoman. Jerusalem police said initially the father had told them he had hurt himself when he fell.
- 3 April
  - Majd Abu Khalid (23) was hit by live bullets in the lower limbs as Israeli forces dispersed the weekly protest march at Kafr Qaddum. Dozens of Palestinian and foreign activists were reportedly injured by rubber-coated steel bullets in the dame protest.
  - Kifah Mansour (33) suffered two leg wounds from rubber-coated bullet during the weekly protest march Bil'in. Dozens were reportedly injured by after tear-gas canisters, stun grenades and rubber bullets were deployed to disperse the demonstration.
  - Israeli forces, firing into the security buffer zone of the Gaza Strip, injured 3 Palestinians in the al-Sanati area east of Khan Younis.
- 8 April
  - Two Israeli soldiers were stabbed, one suffering a serious neck wound, by Muhammad Jasser Karakra of the village of Sinjil. The incident took place at 10 a.m. north of Ramallah on Route 60 near the settlement of Shilo. The assailant was shot dead by First Sergeant Tomer Lan, who was lightly wounded.
  - Gazan fisherman Khalid Zayid was shot by a rubber-coated steel bullet fired from an Israeli gunboat while fishing off Beit Lahia in the northern Gaza Strip. It was the 29th such incident since September 1, 2014. Over that period, 42 fishermen have been arrested and 12 boats confiscated.
- 10 April
  - Ziyad Awad (27) was shot dead by Israeli forces after attending his cousin Jaafar Awad (22)'s funeral in Beit Ummar. According to Palestinians present at the scene, he was shot in the back. From 6 to 13 other Palestinians were wounded in the clashes, 3 by live fire according to local medical sources. The IDF denied it had used live ammunition, in an initial statement, and then said it resorted to live ammunition when rioters remained undaunted by rubber bullets, with 4 'hits' reported.
  - Israeli forces opened fire in the al-Sanati area east of Khan Yunis in the Gaza Strip reportedly wounding a Palestinian.
  - 12 Palestinian youths during clashes in al-Jalazun refugee camp were wounded, 3 by live fire, 9 by rubber-coated steel bullets, during clashes with Israeli troops, after bottles and rocks were thrown at the latter near the Separation Wall being built around Beit El.
- 13 April
  - Israel forces blocked off exit and entry to Hizma, a Palestinian village with 7,000 residents, threatening to maintain the blockade until the villagers identified for them the culprits of a stone-throwing incident, in what B'Tselem calls a measure of 'collective punishment'. The blockade was repeated the following day.
- 14 April
  - 22 Palestinians were injured in Sinjil by excessive tear gas inhalation and rubber bullets fired during violent clashes with Israeli forces, some reportedly masked, that took place during the funeral of Muhammad Jasser Karakra, who was shot after stabbing two Israeli soldiers on April 8.
  - A Palestinian worker from Jenin in an Israeli shop in an Umm al-Fahm repair shop was reportedly kept by his employer in detention, beaten and threatened after he broke a mobile phone screen he was mending. He was freed after liaison between Palestinian police and Israeli police enabled the latter to secure his release.
  - The State Attorney's Office notified that it would make an indictment for a minor offense, involving a "reckless and negligent act" for the shooting of Samir Awad (16) in the back and killing him near Budrus, as he fled in January 2013.
- 15 April
  - A car driven by a Palestinian, Khaled Kutina (Koutineh, 37) of the West Bank village of Anata hit two Israelis at the French Hill junction in Jerusalem. Shalom Yohai Sharki (25), son of a prominent religious-Zionist rabbi, was killed his girlfriend and Shira Klein (23) was seriously injured. The incident was initially treated as a traffic accident, but on investigation was redefined as a possible terror attack. Kutinba's wife said the incident was an accident in bad weather as he was driving to his parents' home in Jerusalem's Old Quarter. On April, 21 the media was permitted to report that Koutineh told police that he was intent on "seeking out Jews to murder."
- 16 April
  - 7 Palestinians were shot with rubber-coated steel bullets during clashes with Israeli soldiers following a prisoner rights march to Ofer jail in Beitunia.
  - Suleiman Mahmoud al-Tarbi (20) was critically injured when he was shot in the eye during clashes when Israeli forces from the Ma'ale Adumim settlement raided al-Isawiya. The black sponge-tipped bullet (Model 4557) causing the injury are heavier than the blue bullets used earlier, and caused more serious wounds. He said he had gone out to buy cigarettes at the time. It was the 2nd blinding incident in two weeks, after 13-year-old Zakariya Julani of Shuafat was, according to Palestinians, hit in the eye in early April. al-Tarbi was arrested and hospitalized. Three other youths were also shot by rubber-coated steel bullets in their legs.
- 17 April
  - 3 Palestinians were shot at Ni'lin with live rounds, and a fourth, a teenager, was struck in the mouth by a rubber-coated steel bullet, during a protest march marking Palestinian Prisoner's Day.
  - Ahmad Mohammad Mansour (17) was shot in the chest and Munther Ameera was hit in the leg by live ammunition during a protest march marking Palestinian Prisoner's Day at Bil'in. 60 protestors suffered from tear gas inhalation.
  - 3 Palestinians inside the Gaza Strip, in the al-Sanati area east of Khan Younis, were shot by Israeli forces and required hospitalization.
- 18 April
  - Settler bulldozers reportedly lifted large quantities of nutrient-rich soil from the lands of the Palestinian village of Kafr ad-Dik and dumped the expropriated loam at the Israeli outpost of Lishim where, it is believed, the soil will be used for gardens.
- 20 April
  - A 27-year-old Israeli Palestinian street cleaner or construction worker for the Herzliya Municipality was stabbed by a man, reportedly with a Russian accent, who screamed "Death to Arabs" and then wounded him in the shoulder. Police arrested a suspect, who has reportedly confessed.
- 21 April
  - 450 olive trees on the village lands of Deir Istiya were reportedly uprooted by Israeli settlers from Immanuel.
  - 4 Palestinians, Mhanna Fathi Khleif (38), his brother Muhammad (35) and their two pregnant wives, were injured when a car driven by an Israeli settler from Ginot Shomron hit them as they were walking along the main road of the village of Nabi Ilyas. After the driver fled, and informed Israeli police, the case was being treated as a hit-and-run accident.
- 23 April
  - Two rockets were fired by an unknown militant group near Beit Hanoun: one hit Israeli soil, the other fell inside Gaza, with no injury to people or damage to property. The IDF responded with an air strike in the north of the Strip.
  - Israeli forces, following settler claims cars had been stoned, fired large quantities of tear gas at groups of students at the As Sawiya Secondary Girls School near Nablus. One 16-year-old suffered from excessive tear gas inhalation, and 200 others had to be evacuated.
- 24 April
  - Seven Palestinians were injured during the weekly Friday protest at Kafr Qaddum by Israeli live and rubber-coated bullets. Daoud Agel was shot in the leg with a live bullet, and Rifaat Barham (24) lost an eye when a rubber-coated bullet struck his eye. Naser Ishteiwi (44) was hit in his foot, Anas Amer (21) in the back, Muhammad Nidal (20) in the shoulder, and Muhammad Fathi (45) in the hand by rubber bullets.
  - Five Palestinians were wounded, four reportedly by live fire at Bil'in, while Israeli forces intervened in the weekly protest. Ahmad Mohammad Mansour (17) was shot in the chest. Dozens of dunams of olive groves caught fire after tear gas canisters were fired.
  - A Palestinian was reportedly shot and wounded near Khan Younis in the Gaza Strip by Israel Border forces. IDF's "spokeswoman said she was looking into the incident".
  - According to his family, Fadi Abu Mandil (14) was shot by a stray bullet while studying at home in the al-Mughazi refugee camp, when Israeli forces fired towards farmers. He was transferred in a critical condition to a Ramallah hospital on the 28 April.
  - Ali Said Abu Ranam (16) of At Tur, East Jerusalem allegedly attacked Border Police officers with a butcher's cleaver and knife, was pushed away and then shot dead when he ran towards the manned crossing. His family states he was shot for no reason. Israeli reports state warning shots were fired. The incident occurred at the al-Zaim checkpoint outside the Israeli settlement of Ma'ale Adumim.
- 25 April
  - A Palestinian from Idhna, Mahmoud Abu Jheisha (20), initially wrongly identified as Assad al-Salayma, was shot dead when, rushing a combat unit, he stabbed an Israeli soldier three times near the Cave of the Patriarchs ("Ibrahimi Mosque") in Hebron. The incident took place while the soldiers were reportedly blocking Palestinians from worshipping in the mosque. Some days earlier Israeli settlers had raised the Israeli flag over the mosque.
  - 20-26 Palestinians were injured by rubber-coated steel bullets, mostly to their torsos and 50 suffered from excessive tear gas inhalation as Israeli forces clashed with a crowd protesting the death of Muhammad Abu Ghannam (or Ali Said Abu Ranam? shot dead the day before for allegedly attacking Israeli police at Ma'ale Adumim. Two Palestinian medics were numbered among the casualties. A police officer was wounded by a Palestinian rock-thrower during the clashes.
  - A bus on Route 443 driving towards Jerusalem caught fire after being hit by a Molotov cocktail. No passengers were injured.
  - Four Israeli police officers were injured, three lightly, when a Palestinian, driving down from the cemetery of the Mount of Olives veered off and his car rammed into the officers on the sidewalk. Fadi Saleh (31) from the Shuafat refugee camp in East Jerusalem was subsequently arrested on suspicion of being the "terror attack". When Jerusalem Mayor Nir Barkat arrived to the scene of the attack, his car came under attack by rock-throwers.
- 26 April
  - A 37-year-old Palestinian man was reportedly shot in the right leg in the Abu Safiya area east of Beit Hanoun after Israeli forces opened fire on fishermen and farmers across the Gaza Strip.
- 27 April
  - Israeli military administration officials of the West Bank razed four farming buildings in the Jericho village of al-Jiftlik
  - Collateral damage from an Israeli military exercise apparently caused fires that blazed over 3-4,000 dunams of Palestinian farmland planted with wheat and barley in the Humsa area of eastern Tubas district, a key agricultural area. Israel declared the area a 'closed military zone'.
  - Muhammad Murad Muhammad Mustafa Yahiya (18) was critically wounded by Israeli forces when he was shot in the stomach by live ammunition near Araqah village, west of Jenin, close to the Israeli settlement of Shaked. He died the following morning. According to Israeli reports he was the instigator of a group that was trying to breach the Separation Barrier between Israel and the West Bank. Calls to "halt" were ignored. According to his father, he was strolling with friends on village grounds after a wedding.
  - A settler's car was hit by a Molotov cocktail and caught fire south of Nablus, ear the Huwara and Zaatara checkpoints.
- 28 April
  - According to Palestinian reports, several houses and crops were damaged when Israeli forces shot into agricultural land at Khuza'a east of Khan Younis, causing farmers to flee. Reports say crops near the border were sprayed with poisonous pesticides that burn cultivations.
  - Israel forces demolished the home of Muhammad Mahmoud al-Tamimi in Nabi Salih, which was built before 1967. The owner is reportedly an American citizen of Palestinian descent. Many of the homes slated for demolition are near the Israeli settlement of Halamish, and it is believed locally that the move indicates plans for expansion of the settlement of Halamish.
- 29 April
  - A 270-square metre steel barn in Rujeib in the Nablus Governorate which its owner, Alaa al-Din Riyad, used for his sheep flocks, was bulldozed to the ground by Israeli forces, within a few hours notification, on the grounds that it lacked an Israeli permit.

Undated

  - Between April 21–27,
  - Settlers in Hebron assaulted a 17-year-old Palestinian youth near the Al Ibrahimi Mosque
  - 165 Palestinian olive trees and grapevines were vandalized in distinct episodes near the Israeli settlements of Karmei Tzur and Elazar.

=== May ===
In the week between 28 April and 4 May, 13 Palestinians, including two children and five journalists, were injured by Israeli forces operating in the West Bank, and one Palestinian was wounded by live fire in East Jerusalem. A rocket fired from Gaza towards Israeli fell short and exploded in the Gaza Strip.25 incidents of Israeli naval forces firing on fishermen's boats from Gaza in the ARA restricted area were reported. 320 Palestinians, half of them children were displaced from their dwellings for two days as Israeli military exercises took place in the Jordan Valley. Three homes were demolished for lack of Israeli permits in Area C of the West Bank. The Israeli High Court turned down a request to halt the proposed demolition of the Palestinian village of Susiya. In 95 search-and-arrest operations 110 Palestinians were arrested.3 incidents of Palestinian stone throwing, resulting in injuries to 2 Israelis and damage to vehicles were reported. Between 5 and 11 May, 31 Palestinians, including 7 children were injured by Israeli forces, 23 in the West Bank. A further 8, including 5 fisherman, 2 farmers and a child, were shot in restricted access areas inside or offshore from the Gaza Strip, where Israeli forces opened fire on 18 occasions. 102 Israeli search and arrest operations were conducted in the West Bank and 97 Palestinians were arrested. 3 families in Silwan were displaced when Israeli settlers took over 3 apartments. A health clinic in Shuafat providing services to 62 Palestinian schools was closed for 1 year, as contravening an Israeli law stating that the Palestinian Authority cannot operate in East Jerusalem. 8 Palestinian structures were demolished in Area C, affecting 51 families, and 3,000 metres of water pipes were confiscated. 30 electrical poles and 3000 meters in cables supplying electricity to the village of Um Sidra. 4 Palestinian attacks on Israelis were registered. 87 Palestinians, including 18 children and 3 women, were injured by Israeli forces, 29 by live ammunition. In the Gaza Strip, 74 Palestinian security forces were injured trying to defuse unexploded ordnance (UXO) west of Beit Lahiya. Israeli forces opened fire 20 times into ARA access restricted area inside or offshore of the Gaza Strip. In Area C, a commercial structure in Silwad (Ramallah) for lack of an Israelil permit. In the Jordan Valley, two kilometers of donor funded irrigation pipes in Al Jiftlik Abu al 'Ajaj and Umm Al Obor were confiscated for lacking Israeli permits. 10 settler attacks on Palestinians and their property, in which 5 people, among them an 18-month-old child and an elderly couple, were injured by Israeli stone throwing, occurred. 959 trees and sapling were destroyed by arson, and 22 vehicles damaged by settler stone throwing. A Palestinian injured 4 Israelis when he crashed his car into an Israeli bus station near Gush Etzion. There were 7 incidents of Palestinian stone throwing causing damage to settler property, and 4 injuries to Israelis. I Palestinian was shot dead after his car hit several Israeli border policemen. 77 Palestinians, including 8 children, one shot in the eye, were injured during protest clashes. In the Gaza Strip, on at least, Israeli forces opened fire 22 times in the Access Restricted Area (ARA) in and around the Gaza Strip, injuring fisherman. including a 16-year-old youth. In 91 search-and-arrest operations, Israeli forces detained 106 Palestinians. 9 Palestinian buildings were demolished for lack of Israeli permits in Area C and East Jerusalem, displacing 9 families. Settlers made 5 attacks, resulting in injury or property damage. 235 trees were set on fire and vandalized on Palestinian lots in Salfit and Tulkarm. Two Palestinian attacks, one involving stabbing, injuring Israelis or their property occurred in East Jerusalem. An Israeli car was struck by a Molotov bomb near Beit Hanina. Between May 26 and June 1, 64 Palestinians, including 9 children, were injured in the West Bank, the majority during clashes in solidarity protests over the administrative detention of Palestinians, and against construction of the separation barrier. Israeli naval forces fired on fisherman at least times in the offshore Gaza restricted access area, injuring 2. 81 search-and-arrest operations were launched in the West Bank. Including detentions of fishermen, 104 Palestinians were detained. Settlers attacked twice, once throwing stones and setting fire to a house in Tel Rumeida; the other incodent involved stone throwing at Palestinian cars on the Nahalin to Husan road. One incident was recorded of a Molotov cocktail being thrown, which damaged an Israeli vehicle near Beit Hanina.

- 1 May
  - 3 Palestinian teenagers were shot by live ammunition during clashes with Israeli forces in the Jalazone refugee camp. A number of others were injured by rubber coated steel bullets.
  - Inad Ibrahim (20) and another, unidentified Palestinian man were shot in their legs with live fire when Israeli forces intervened in the weekly protest in Kafr Qaddum.
- 4 May
  - Hatem Salah (35) from Shuafat Refugee Camp was shot in the legs at Givat Hamivtar station near the French Hill neighborhood after a security guard claimed Salah had attacked him from behind. Other guards stated they thought the man was pulling what they suspected might be a knife from his pocket, triggering their shooting response, with shots fired in the air before he was shot in the leg. He was also reported to have rushed other passengers after allegedly trying to stab the policeman. No knife was found, and at a hearing, it emerged Salah held a trouser belt in his hand, and that he had been assaulted by two Israeli policemen in the same area the night before.
  - The Israel High Court gave the go-ahead to the razing to the ground of the Palestinian village of Susya, which, if executed, will leave an estimated 350-450 residents homeless.
- 5 May
  - According to Palestinian sources, a Palestinian farmer, Hammad Dweikat (48) required hospitalization after being severely bruised by Israeli soldiers while working his land at Rujeib. A Palestinian official claimed that Dweikat was under severe pressure to abandon his land, on which an Israeli watchtower has been constructed.
- 6 May
  - A building with 3 apartments in Silwan, rented by the Abu Nab family since 1968 from the Abd al-Razzaq family was seized by 20 Israeli settlers under armed guard while the Abu Nab family were away on a visit to relatives in northern Israel. The settler organization Ateret Cohanim claims it as Yemenite Jewish property prior to 1948.
  - Lands in the Suba area in Idhna belonging to the Ihreiz, al-Zaatari, al-Qawasmi and al-Tarturi families, planted with almond and olive trees, were razed by Israeli bulldozers. In addition, a greenhouse, a support wall, some gardens and several dry-stone walls were destroyed.
- 7 May
  - Rabee Jamal Mubarak (22) was seriously wounded by shots to his back and abdomen during an Israeli raid on the al-Fara refugee camp in the West Bank.
  - 15 settlers attacked and stoned the car of Jawad Naji, a senior adviser to Palestinian Prime Minister Rami Hamdallah near the settlement of Halamish.
  - Israeli forces destroyed the electricity grid of the village of al-Ramadin. According to Ma'an News Agency, after schoolchildren protested, tear gas was fired, hurting several. Two of the youths were detained.
- 8 May
  - Nael Suleiman Salah (19) was shot in the head, and critically wounded, in the area of Beit Lahiya by Israeli forces. He died a year later, 8 July 2015, and Hamas announced he had been a member of their Izz al-Din al-Qassam Brigades. An Israeli spokeswoman claimed warning shots were fired as the security fence was approached by a group of Palestinians, and then at the "main instigator"'s legs. The "instigation" was, she alleged, related to an attempt to breach the security fence.
  - A Gazan fisherman was reportedly wounded by Israeli fire while fishing off the coast, for going beyond the zone Israel designates for fishing.
  - Dozens of Palestinian demonstrators marchers reportedly suffered from excessive tear-gas inhalation when Israeli forces intervened toi disperse the weekly Bil'in protest. Ashraf al-Khatib, his wife and their three children suffered tear-gas inhalation inside their home from a tear-gas canister fired at local habitations.
- 9 May
  - 3 Palestinians from Khan Younis were shot near Beit Lahiya by Israeli forces. One man's condition was diagnosed as serious. An Israeli spokesman said she was aware that "suspects" had been noted near the border, that warning shots had been fired, and that she was not unaware of any injuries sustained.
- 11 May
  - A 19-year-old Israel was reported to have suffered a light wound to the back from a Palestinian, who then fled in a taxi. The incident took place near the Mishor Adumim Junction, next to the settlement of Ma'ale Adumim.
- 14 May
  - 4 Israelis were injured when Muhammad al-Rafiya (22) from Hebron, a Palestinian who had earlier been arrested and imprisoned for throwing rocks a possession of a firearm, slammed his car into them as they were waiting for a hitchhike at a station. The attack occurred in the same junction where three Israeli teenagers had been kidnapped less than a year earlier.
  - In clashes between Israeli forces and students in the Jabal al-Tawil neighborhood of al-Bireh, 3 Palestinian children were reportedly wounded by live fire while a further 6, all under 10 years of age, were arrested and taken to the settlement of Psagot.
  - A Palestinian youth was injured by a steel coated bullet in clashes near Rachel's Tomb, Bethlehem, involving the throwing of stones and molotov cocktails.
  - Dozens of Gazans were injured, and 15 required hospitalization, when ordnance left over from the 2014 Gaza war exploded while sappers were attempting to dismantle a F16 rocket left by the Israeli army.
- 15 May
  - Some 21 Palestinians were injured, mostly, according to Palestinian reports, by live fire when 30 military jeeps escorted 1,500 Israelis around midnight to Joseph's Tomb in Nablus, and were met by protesting youths hurling rocks and bottles. Though in Area A under full Palestinian authority, under the Oslo Accords it remained under Israeli control and Muslims are forbidden to pray there.
  - 3 Palestinians commemorating Nakba Day near the border in Gaza were shot in the legs with live ammunition by Israeli forces. Israel described the marchers as rioters, and said they had refused to halt when ordered to do so. A total of 21 Palestinians were reportedly wounded on the day. 7 demonstrators were wounded in a protest outside Ofer military prison, and a further 10 in Nablus.
- 16 May
  - Several Palestinians, participating in a Nakba Day commemoration march near an Israel checkpoint close to Huwara were injured by rubber bullets when Israeli forces intervened. The casualties include Nidal Ishtayeh, a Palestinian journalist for Xinhua News, shot in the eye as he was taking a photo, and later denied entry to East Jerusalem for specialized treatment at St John Eye Hospital Group; of Khalid Mansour, of the Palestinian People's Party, and an Italian protester, shot in her hand and chest.
- 17 May
  - Hundreds of olive saplings planted on 80 acres of land said to be owned by the al-Ayada families at Ash-Shuyukh were reportedly uprooted by settlers, the fourth such incident.
  - 2 Israeli Policemen were injured, on to the head, by rocks thrown by dozens of Palestinian at Damascus Gate in Jerusalem's Old City. Clashes erupted during a march, including through the Muslim quarter where businesses were to close their shops, and residents to remain indoors, on Jerusalem Day, an Israel commemoration of the establishment of Israeli control over the Old City in the aftermath of the June 1967 Six-Day War.
- 18 May
  - According to Palestinian sources, 5 settler youths from Bat Ayin set fire to 25 dunams of Palestinian land at Hilet Ikdeis, and caused the destruction of 250 olive trees. The owners allege that IDF troops arriving on the scene declined to call for a fire engine to douse the flames.
- 20 May
  - Three policeman suffered light injuries when Omran Omar Abu Dheim (41) from Jabel Mukaber allegedly swerved his Land Cruiser into a group of Israeli Border policemen at At-Tur. A third officer on duty shot the man dead. Israeli sources state he was trying to reverse the car over the policeman to "confirm" the kill when he was shot. Palestinians on the scene variously claim the driver's car skidded while overtaking another vehicle, and that he tried to make a U-turn, denying that the intent was terroristic. Israeli police confiscated videos covering the incident from several Palestinian businesses. According to his brother Shafik, Abu Dheim worked as a security officer for Israeli transport companies. He also said that eyewitnesses told him that "Omran was trying to make a U-turn in the middle of the road, but was impeded by a truck which was unloading vegetables at a produce shop." Further he told Ma'an that according to eyewitnesses, the incident occurred close to the Al-Maqasid and Augusta Victoria hospitals, but attempts to succor him were delayed for half an hour.
- 21 May
  - Yahiya Sami al-Amudi (10) was shot by Israeli police in the head with a rubber-coated bullet, reportedly while passing near a checkpoint at the Shuafat refugee camp. Israeli police spokesman, Micky Rosenfeld, described his injuries as 'moderate'. Hospitalized with a fractured skull and jaw, and wounded also in the left ear, he underwent surgery to remove his left eye and remained in a critical condition. The spokesman said the incident occurred when representatives of the Jerusalem municipality were met with stone-throwing. The weapons the police used were, he added, not lethal.
- 23 May
  - A 19-year-old Palestinian was arrested on suspicion of having stabbed two Israeli youths, respectively 15 and 18 years old, in the back as they were on their way to prayer at the Western Wall for Shavuot. It added to a spate of similar attacks in this period. In early June police identified the assailant as, John Kakish, a Christian from Jerusalem's Old Quarter, suspected earlier of stabbing attacks. He motivated his attacks as revenge for racist slogans and for putatively having been the victim of acts of violence earlier.
- 25 May
  - A Gazan fisherman, Muhammad Ziad Bakr (26) was shot by Israeli forces off the coast of Beit Lahiya. According to an Israeli spokesperson, his boat "deviated from the designated fishing zone and after warning shots, forces fired at the lower extremities of a fisherman. A direct hit was confirmed". Israel allows Gazans fish up to six nautical miles from the Gaza Strip's shore.
  - Some hours afterwards, Imad Muhsin Bakir (26) another Gazan fisherman, was shot by Israeli forces in the same zone.
  - Israel delivered demolition orders for an 800-metre electricity grid and water well in al-Kum village provided by the al-Yassiriya municipality.
- 26 May
  - One rocket, reportedly a BM-21 Grad was launched into Israel from Gaza, apparently after an internal dispute within the military wing of the Islamic Jihad group over a new military commander's appointment. The projectiile struck open ground in the vicinity of Gan Yavne. No damage or injuries were reported, though a 15-year-old girl from Ashdod was hospitalized for panic shock. According to the Gaza-based al- Mezan Center for Human Rights Israel had fired into border zones within the Gaza Strip on 6 separate occasions, injuring 4 people, including a child, in the first 10 days of May. It is the fourth projectile, including two mortars, and the first medium range rocket fired from the Gaza Strip since the cessation of hostilities in the Gaza war in late August 2014. While Defense Minister Moshe Ya'alon identified the Islamic Jihad group as the perpetrator behind the attack, an IDF source said Israel held Hamas ultimately responsible for any fire from the Gaza Strip. A day later, Hamas announced it had arrested those responsible for the launching of the rocket, since it is "against the interests of the Palestinian factions in the Gaza Strip".
- 27 May
  - Israeli launched four retaliatory strikes before dawn on targets it defined as terrorist infrastructure, Hamas and Islamic Jihad training facilities: at Rafah on a site used by Salah al-Din Brigades, the military wing of the Popular Resistance Committees and Khan Younis in the southern area, an Al-Qassam Brigades site east of Gaza City near the Gaza International Airport and at Beit Lahiya in the northern Gaza Strip. The strike was a response to a rocket fired the day before.
  - A Gazan fisherman, Islam Murad, was injured when Israeli naval forces fired on boats off the coast from Gaza, to enforce the Blockade of the Gaza Strip which includes restrictions on fishable coastal zones, beyond which Palestinians are forbidden to trawl.
  - Settlers from Yitzhar reportedly appropriated 10 dunams of land in the West Bank village of Huwara belonging to Yasser Mutie Hussein Ali, and have planted it with grapevines.
  - Israeli military authorities notified owners of land in Isawiya they will requisition 8,200 square meters for urgent military purposes for two and a half years. The land includes a farm owned by heirs of Radi Ahmad Issa Abu Riyala. Such seizure orders are frequently renewed.
- 29 May
  - Five Palestinians were arrested after their car was stopped at the southwestern entrance to Isawiya neighborhood. Amongst the occupants was the wife of a Palestinian prisoner, Anwar Jamjoum. The car was also seized. In subsequent clashes, five Palestinians were injured by shrapnel from stun grenades and rubber-coated steel bullets.

=== June ===
Between 2–9 June operations by Israeli forces and clashes in the West Bank led to injuries to 19 Palestinians, including 7 children, were injured by Israeli forces in the West Bank in the context of clashes.2 boys, 13 and 16 respectively, were shot by live ammunition at Silwad (Ramallah) and Balata Refugee Camp. 3 boys, aged 12 and 17, were hit by sound bombs in East Jerusalem, during clashes; a 17-year-old Abu Dis boy was wounded by a rubber-coated steel bullet. A 9-year-old boy suffered severe burns when he tampered with unexploded Israeli ordnance near his home in Tuba. A Gaza militant group fired rockets into Israel twice. On 25 occasions Israeli forces opened fire on Gazans fishing around the area of the restricted zone, or farming near the border. Search-and-arrest operations led to the arrest of 122 Palestinians. Israel demolished 28 structures in Area C of the West Bank and East Jerusalem for lack of Israeli permits. Two settler attacks involving stone throwing were registered against Palestinian traffic. Between 9–15 June, 2 Palestinians were shot and killed, according to Israeli sources while trying to throw Molotov cocktails. 15 Palestinians, including 3 children, were injured. Israeli forces opened fire in the restricted access areas around Gaza on 12 occasions. 98 Palestinians were arrested during 81 search-and-arrest operations in the West Bank and one near Gaza.16 Palestinian-owned structures were razed for lack of Israeli permits, 13 in Area C and 3 in East Jerusalem. 2 settler attacks occurred: 8 trees in Susya (Hebron) were vandalized, and 20 dunams of wheat fields were fired at Kafr al-Labad near the Israeli settlement of Enav. 3 Palestinian attacks against Israelis in East Jerusalem were reported. In one an Israeli woman was injured by stone throwing; a settler's residence and a vehicle were also damaged. Between 16–22 July, An Israel citizen was killed and another wounded by a Palestinian nearr Israeli civilian injured, reportedly by a Palestinian, while touring near Deir Ibzi in the West Bank. A Palestinian stabbed a policeman in East Jerusalem. 19 Palestinians, among whom 2 children, were injured. In two incidents in the Gaza Restricted zone, Israeli soldiers shot 3 civilians, and entered the Gaza Strip one to level land with bulldozers. A home was demolished in Beit Hanina for lack of a permit. 5 settler attacks damaging Palestinian property were registered, damaging olive trees or stoning Palestinian cars. 5 Israelis were injured from Palestinian stone throwing. Over the week from 23 to 29 June, a Palestinian was shot dead near the Hamra checkpoint, and in a follow-up raid a 17-year-old was wounded by live ammunition at Al-Awja. I settler was killed and 3 wounded in a drive-by shooting near Nablus, and a Palestinian woman stabbed an Israeli policewoman on checkpoint duty near Gilo. 3 incidents resulting in damage to Israeli property, including an ambulance fired on near Beit El settlement, were recorded. Israelis wounded 9 Palestinians, including g 2 children in multiple incidents during stone throwing clashes in Al-Ram, Kafr Qaddum, Ni'lin, Askar Refugee Camp and Al Awja. Israeli forces opened fire on 8 occasions in the Gaza ARA, and on one occasion shot a missile at an olive farm near Beit Hanoun. Boats and crops were damaged. 5 settler attacks, resulting in property damage and personal injury were registered at Hebron and in East Jerusalem, while 20 dunams at Tayba village were set on fire, and a vehicle was damaged from stone throwing near Majdal Bani Fadil.

- 2 June
  - 3 Gazan fishermen from the al-Shati refugee camp were wounded off the coast of al-Sudaniyya by Israeli naval fire when their boats were fired on after the boats had reportedly deviated from the restricted fishing zone and both orders to halt and warning shots had been given.
  - Israel demolished 3 dwellings, 2 apartments belonging to Abu Rmeila, and the upper storey of a house belonging to Rafiq al-Salayma in the Arab neighbourhood of Silwan in East Jerusalem for lacking Israeli construction permits.
- 3 June
  - According to residents of Khuza'a, a 22-year-old Palestinian farmer was shot in the stomach from an Israeli border watchtower for coming too close to the separation fence.
  - A settler car hit Ahmad Khayri Hzayyim Sultan (22) near the village of Haris northwest of Salfit. Israeli police have opened an investigation into the case.
  - 2 rockets were fired around 11 pm from al-Shati into Israeli territory, striking open ground. One fell in the Sdot region, the other in the Hof Ashkelon region. A radical Islamist Salafist group, the Sheikh Omar Hadid Brigade, asserting it intended to 'wage jihad against Jews,' claimed responsibility, stating that was in retaliation against Hamas for the killing of one of its supporters in a shootout on 2 June in the Gaza Strip, when the militant resisted arrest for detention of illegal weapons.
- 4 June
  - In multiple strikes, the IAF targeted 3 Izzadine al-Qassam brigades in Gaza City, and a 4th in Khan Younis, holding Hamas responsible.
  - Israeli bullzozers accompanied by several military jeeps, backed by a court order, leveled about 20 dunams (5 acres) of private Palestinian property at Qarnat Hadid outside Surif, reportedly razing olive trees, toppling dry stone walls, and using the rubble to fill 3 wells, rendering them unusable. When local owners tried to reclaim it in 2008, Israel declared it was state land, and access had been denied since then.
  - 1 young Palestinian man was hit in the head, and another by several rounds in the abdomen, when Israeli forces opened fire during clashes at the Mafraq al-Jabal area of Abu Dis. Another 8 were reportedly injured by the bullets.
- 6 June
  - A Katyusha 130 rocket was fired from Gaza and struck open ground in Israel near Ashkelon. A Salafi group calling itself the Sheikh Omar Hadid-Bayt al-Maqdis claimed responsibility stating the action was a solidarity protest against Palestinian prisoners in Israeli jails, and Salafist militants incarcerated by Hamas in Gaza. Hamas stated that the recent rocket fire comes from supporters of ISIS, which has been challenging Hamas for its crackdown on Salafi militants.
- 7 June
  - In response to the rocket attack, the Israeli airforce struck a Hamas military installation in the northern Gaza area operated by Hamas' military wing, the al-Qassam Brigades.
  - One Palestinian was shot in the foot, another in the shoulder after the two threw a pipe bomb at the District Coordination Office in Beit Jala.
  - Mustafa Salih Muslih (56) was hospitalized after being struck by a settler's car in a hit-and-run incident, near the settlement of Ariel
- 10 June
  - Izz al-Din Walid Bani Gharra (21) was killed by an Israeli Border Policeman during a raid on the Jenin Refugee Camp in a search-and-arrest operation and shot him in the chest. The incident occurred as the troops were withdrawing. According to Israeli reports he was shot dead while he was trying to throw an improvised explosive device.
  - 8.5 dunams, approximately two acres of land, with olive, palm and pear trees belonging to the Sabri Yahya Darwish family was bulldozed to the ground by Israel Parks Administration authorities in Isawiya East Jerusalem. The authorities also destroyed a 60-square-meter room, a water well, and a fence, without giving prior notice according to Palestinian sources.
- 11 June
  - Israeli bulldozers under military protection leveled 17 dunums (4 acres) of land located between the settlements of Beitar Illit and Tzur Hadassah at Wadi Fukin, the property of Palestinian farmer Sabri Rashad Manasra
  - A rocket was fired towards Israel, but fell short and hit the Gaza Strip. Responsibility for the launching was claimed by a Salafi group, Sheikh Amer al-Hadid Beit al Maqdis, and which cited Israel's treatment of Salafis in prison, and the killing of a Palestinian in Jenin two days earlier.
- 12 June
  - 5 Palestinians were injured, 2 critically, when Israeli forces intervened to disperse the weekly protest march at Kafr Qaddum concerning the closure of the village's exit road. Muhammad Majid (20) was shot in both the stomach and chest by live rounds; Ibrahim Mousa (35) received a bullet in his abdomen, reportedly while at home. Muhammad Nidal (20), Mouiz Khader were shot in the legs, Ayman Farouq (38), in the hand.
  - Several soldiers from the mainly religious Netzah Yehuda Battalion were caught on video as they handed out a severe beating to Shadi al-Ghabashi while he lay pinned to the ground and had already been arrested. The incident occurred in the Jalazone during clashes between stone throwing Palestinians and the IDF. al-Gabashi had reportedly confronted soldiers to protest the throwing of tear gas grenades into his home. In disciplinary measures, the commanding officer, while stating the arrest was legitimate, ordered 2 soldiers to be punished with "conditional imprisonment" for 28 days, and another two were confined to their base for a month. Israeli sources also reported that the Palestinian video omitted what soldiers testimony asserted had happened: that the man taunted and physically assaulted soldiers, and tried to wrest a rifle from one of them. Such incidents in the West Bank, according to guidelines, are seen as attempts to delegitimize Israel. A full video clip of the clash was then released by Palestinians. According to Ynet it does not appear to show the Palestinian grabbing at the soldier's rifle, as the IDF claimed after an investigation.
- 13 June
  - A Palestinian man from Gaza was shot in the legs after approaching the security fence near the Sufa crossing after warning shots were fired. He was hospitalized for treatment in Israel. An OCHA report writes of an 18-year-old mentally disabled youth shot and injured while trying to scale the fence.
- 14 June
  - Abdullah Iyad Ghuneimat (21), according to Palestinian sources, was hit by an Israeli military jeep after he had been shot in the back during clashes at the village of Kafr Malik. The jeep is said to have been in pursuit of him for stone-throwing when it spun out of control and flipped to land on top of him, severing his leg. Amira Hass says he was run over by the jeep. Witnesses variously reported that he was left under the jeep for over an hour, or three hours, until the body was finally retrieved by Palestinians after a struggle. According to his family, the incident occurred while he was returning home from work at a nearby poultry farm. A neighbor informed them of an incident at 4 am., they rushed to the scene but could not approach the car, since Israeli soldiers fired warning shots, allowing local residents to remove the jeep with a bulldozer at 6:30 am. The family further stated that a Molotov was indeed thrown, from a roof, not from ground level, where their son was walking. Their son had been imprisoned by Israel in the past for 2 years for stone throwing. In the official Israeli account, a suspicious man tried to throw a Molotov cocktail at soldiers, the vehicle swerved and hit Ghanayim on the roadside. The incident was deemed to be an accident.
- 16 June
  - Israeli forces bulldozed hundreds of five year old saplings near Tubas in a 500 dunam area Israel defines as a nature reserve and firing zone.
- 18 June
  - 2 brothers from Balata Refugee Camp, Iyad Muin Muhammad Kalbuna (23) and Muhammad Ghassan Hammad Hashash (24) in clashes near Joseph's Tomb as Israeli troops escorted worshippers to the site during the night. One was shot in the foot, the other in the thigh.
- 19 June
  - Danny Gonen (25), a resident from Lod in Israel, was shot dead by a Palestinian gunman, using a 9mm handgun, after they stopped when the Palestinian waved down their car on a dirt road near the West Bank settlement of Dolev and the village of Deir Ibzi. His companion was wounded in the hand. The two had been bathing in the spring of Ein Bubin while on a hiking tour in the West Bank. Hamas, while not claiming responsibility, hailed the attack as "excellent". A group, the "Marwan Kawasme and Amar Abu Isa cell", claiming affiliation to Hamas's military wing, the Izz al-Din al-Qassam Brigades, assumed responsibility for the attack. On 15 July Israel arrested 5 Palestinian suspects, and identified one of them, Muhammaed Abu Shahin of Qalandiya, identified as a member of the PNA's elite Force 17 unit, as the gunman who killed Gili Cohen. The spring has been renamed 'Danny's Spring' and a memorial to him, erected on private Palestinian land, was inaugurated by an Israeli government minister.
- 21 June
  - Yaser Yasin al-Tarawah (18) from the West Bank village of Sa'ir near Hebron stabbed an Israeli Border Police officer, leaving him in a critical condition, with multiple wounds to the neck, chest and heart. The officer managed to shoot his assailant 6 times, and he too is in a critical condition. The incident occurred in the Damascus Gate, outside the Old City of Jerusalem. The stabber had managed to infiltrate into Israel without a permit, and has no precedents for prior security offenses. In East Jerusalem, an 18-year-old Palestinian youth from Sair (Hebron) stabbed and severely injured an Israeli border policeman, and was subsequently shot and critically injured by the latter. In response Israeli authorities cancelled permits for people from Sa'ir for Friuday prayer in Jerusalem, and 500 permits allowing Palestinians to travel via the Ben Gurion airport.
  - An Israeli 45-year-old bus-driver was lightly injured by broken glass when his bus was pelted with stones and firebombs near the Israeli settlement of Geva Binyamin in the West Bank. Two other passengers suffered shock in the incident.
  - In a clash near the Damascus Gate, involving the use of tear gas canisters, stun grenades, skunk spray and the firing of rubber-coated steel bullets, 4 Palestinians were injured. One was shot above the left eye, the three others were injured by stun grenade shrapnel. a Molotov cocktail was reportedly thrown at an Israeli police vehicle in Isawiya.
  - Molotov cocktails were thrown respectively at a police car and at the home of Jerusalem City Council Member Ariyah King near Ma'ale ha-Zeitim in East Jerusalem.
- 22 June
  - Israeli settlers chainsawed from 35 to 70 olive trees between Yasuf and Jamma'in near the close to the Israeli settlement of Ariel and the Zaatara checkpoint.
  - Israeli forces on the Gaza Strip border shot 2 young Palestinian men east of Khuza’a.
- 23 June
  - A rocket fired towards Israel from the Gaza Strip struck open ground near the border kibbutz of Yad Mordechai in the evening. A group, the Sheikh Omar Hadid-Bayt al-Maqdis, claimed responsibility. A leader of the group said their aim was to trigger war with Hamas, which persecutes them, rather than drag Palestinians into another war with Israel.
  - In a series of attacks on the Talpiot Armon Hanatziv Promenade, a Palestinian gang beat a Jewish couple with brass knuckles, another couple were beaten with clubs by five Palestinians, and five Palestinians attacked a jogger.
- 24 June
  - In reply to the rocket, the IAF struck the missile launching site neat Beit Hanoun before dawn.
- 26 June
  - A Palestinian man drove towards the Beqaot/Bik'ot (al-Hamra) checkpoint in the Jordan Valley and fired at Israeli troops. The man was shot dead as soldiers responded.
  - A Jewish jogger was attacked while running on the Talpiot Armon Hanatziv Promenade by a Palestinian gang.
- 27 June
  - Mohammad Abdul Ilah (14) was shot in the thigh when "Israeli soldiers reportedly fired live rounds and tear gas at the protesters", during a march towards the Israeli barricade that seals the southern entrance to the village of Kafr Qaddum. An Israeli army spokeswoman said she was looking into the incident.
  - А a burst of 15 to 19 shots were fired at a Magen David Adom ambulance near Beit El on a new road connecting Beitin to Ramallah, recently paved for the Palestinians; driver escapes injury, the ambulance was damaged.
  - A couple was roughed up on Talpiot Armon Hanatziv Promenade by a Palestinian gang.
- 28 June
  - According to his family, Ibrahim al-Alami (31) was assaulted, after his car was stopped and he was identified as an Arab, by 3 settlers near Beit Hanina while on his way to work in West Jerusalem.
  - "IDF arrested a Palestinian woman who allegedly attempted to enter Israel from the northern West Bank city of Qalqilya with a shotgun concealed on her back".
- 29 June
  - Ynet reported the last of an ongoing practice by Palestinian vandals in East Jerusalem to trash the Jewish cemetery on The Mount of Olives.
  - Border Police stopped a Palestinian teenager (15) "armed with an assault rifle from entering Israeli territory on the outskirts of the capital".
  - A Palestinian woman, Misoun Mussa (20) from Beit Sahour, stabbed and wounded a 20-year-old female IDF soldier in the neck during a security check at the Rachel's crossing checkpoint between Jerusalem and Bethlehem. The assailant was arrested, and reportedly confessed that she had approached the checkpoint with the intention of killing a soldier.
  - 2015 Shuvat Rachel shooting In a drive-by shooting, gunfire from a passing car wounded 4 settlers, from Kokhav HaShahar as they drove back from Eli and approached the Shvut Rachel junction near the settlement of Shilo. One, Malachi Moshe Rosenfeld (26), a philosophy and economics student at Hebrew University, suffered wounds that left him in a critical condition, and died on June 30; the three others were in a light to moderate condition. Both the Popular Front for the Liberation of Palestine and an organization calling itself Fatah al-Intifada claimed responsibility. An Israeli car was hit by rocks soon after at the Hizmah checkpoint. A high-ranking IDF official said the spate of recent attacks were by a local group, that no connection existed between the attacks, that there is no terror infrastructure behind them, intelligence coordination with the Palestine Authority was ongoing, and that the Palestinians would not be collectively punished. Defense Minister Moshe Ya'alon attributed both an attack on Danny Gonen (19 June) and the drive-by shooting to a Hamas group in Turkey and the impact of Palestinian TV during Ramadan. As a response to the attacks, Palestinian women were to be barred from free access to the Temple Mount and only men 50 and over could pray at Al-Aqsa.
  - Dozens of settlers, reportedly from the settlement of Beit El were said to have attacked Palestinian vehicles between Ramallah and Nablus, in what a Palestinian source described as a reprisal for Monday's drive by shooting. The president of the Shomron Regional Council, called on the government "to authorize the army to act without pity against these savages who take civilians for targets." Multiple raids were conducted at al-Mughayir, Kafr Malik, Qusra, Qaryout, Duma, Asira ash-Shamaliya, Deir Jarir, Ibwein, Ajjul, and Tell, where, variously, arrests were made, video surveillance equipment seized, and one youth shot in the foot by a rubber-coated bullet.
- 30 June
  - Israeli forces shot and wounded a Palestinian man in the stomach when he refused to obey an order to stop and reportedly ran through the vehicle inspection area at Qalandiya checkpoint yelling "Allahu Akbar." He was hospitalized and is described as in a moderate condition.
  - Mahmoud Salih Nofal (60) of Ras Karkar was moderately injured when a group of settlers reportedly doused him with pepper spray and beat him with rods just outside his village. In April 2016, seven members of what Shin Bet described as a "Jewish terrorist ring", including Pinhas Shendorfi (22), the son of Yigal Shendrofi, a rabbi from the settlement of Kiryat Arba, and Itamar Ben Aharon and Michael Kaplan from the settlement of Nahliel, reportedly confessioned to the assault, one of many incidents going back several years.

== See also ==
- Palestinian rocket attacks on Israel
- House demolition in the Israeli–Palestinian conflict
- List of Israeli price tag attacks
