= Avnei Hefetz =

Israeli settlement in the West Bank

Avnei Hefetz: אַבְנֵי חֵפֶץ (Hebrew); أڤني حفيتس (Arabic)

Hebrew transcription(s)
  - Official: Avne Hefez
  - Unofficial: Avnei Chefetz
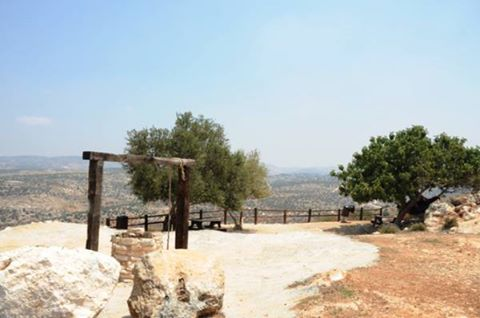
- Etymology: Precious stones
- Location within the Northern West Bank Location within the West Bank
- Coordinates: 32°17′5″N 35°4′26″E
- Country: Palestine
- District: Judea and Samaria Area
- Council: Shomron
- Region: West Bank
- Founded: 1990
- Founder: Students from Karnei Shomron
- Population (2024): 2,526

Avnei Hefetz (Hebrew: אַבְנֵי חֵפֶץ, lit. 'Precious Stones') is an Israeli settlement (organised as a community settlement) located on the western edge of the northern West Bank. The settlement under the administrative municipal government of the Shomron Regional Council, is located adjacent to the Palestinian city of Tulkarm and to the Israeli settlements of Einav and Sal'it.

The international community considers Israeli settlements in the occupied West Bank illegal under international law, but the Israeli government disputes this.

== History ==
Established in 1990 by a group of Israeli Orthodox Jewish students from the Karnei Shomron Hesder Yeshiva with help from Amana, Avnei Hefetz is now home to over 200 families, including hundreds of children. The name of the village comes from Isaiah 54:12:

"And I will make thy pinnacles of rubies, and thy gates of carbuncles, and all thy border of precious stones."

In 1995, the Israeli military confiscated about 200 dunams of land from the Palestinian village Kafr al-Labad in order to enlarge Avnei Hefetz, in total, according to the ARIJ, about 355 dunams of Kafr al-Labad's lands have been added to Avnei Hefetz.

In 2016, settlement construction in the occupied West Bank increased by 34 percent. Authorities initiated a construction adding 1,814 new settler housing units. At least 129 new units in the Avnei Hefetz settlement were added to create a primarily industrial zone, rendering the settlement increasingly closer to the Palestinian village of Shufa.

== Geography ==
The settlement is located adjacent to the Palestinian city of Tulkarm. The nearest Israeli cities are Netanya to the west and Kfar Saba to the southwest, both about a twenty-five-minute drive away. There are four distinct neighborhoods of Avnei Hefetz: Neve Hefetz – urban, Avnei Shoham – rural, Mitzpe Hefetz – rural, Avnei Hen – rural. In 2024 its population was 2,526.

== Education ==
There are many institutions located on the settlement: six nurseries, six kindergartens, a combined elementary school and junior high school, and a morning and evening kollel.
