= Timeline of the Israeli–Palestinian conflict in 2015 =

This list has been split for convenience:

- Timeline of the Israeli–Palestinian conflict in January–June 2015
- Timeline of the Israeli–Palestinian conflict in July–December 2015

== See also ==
- 2015–2016 wave of violence in the Israeli–Palestinian conflict
