= Shufa, Tulkarm =

Shufa
- Municipality type D (Village council)

Arabic transcription(s)
  - Arabic: شوفه
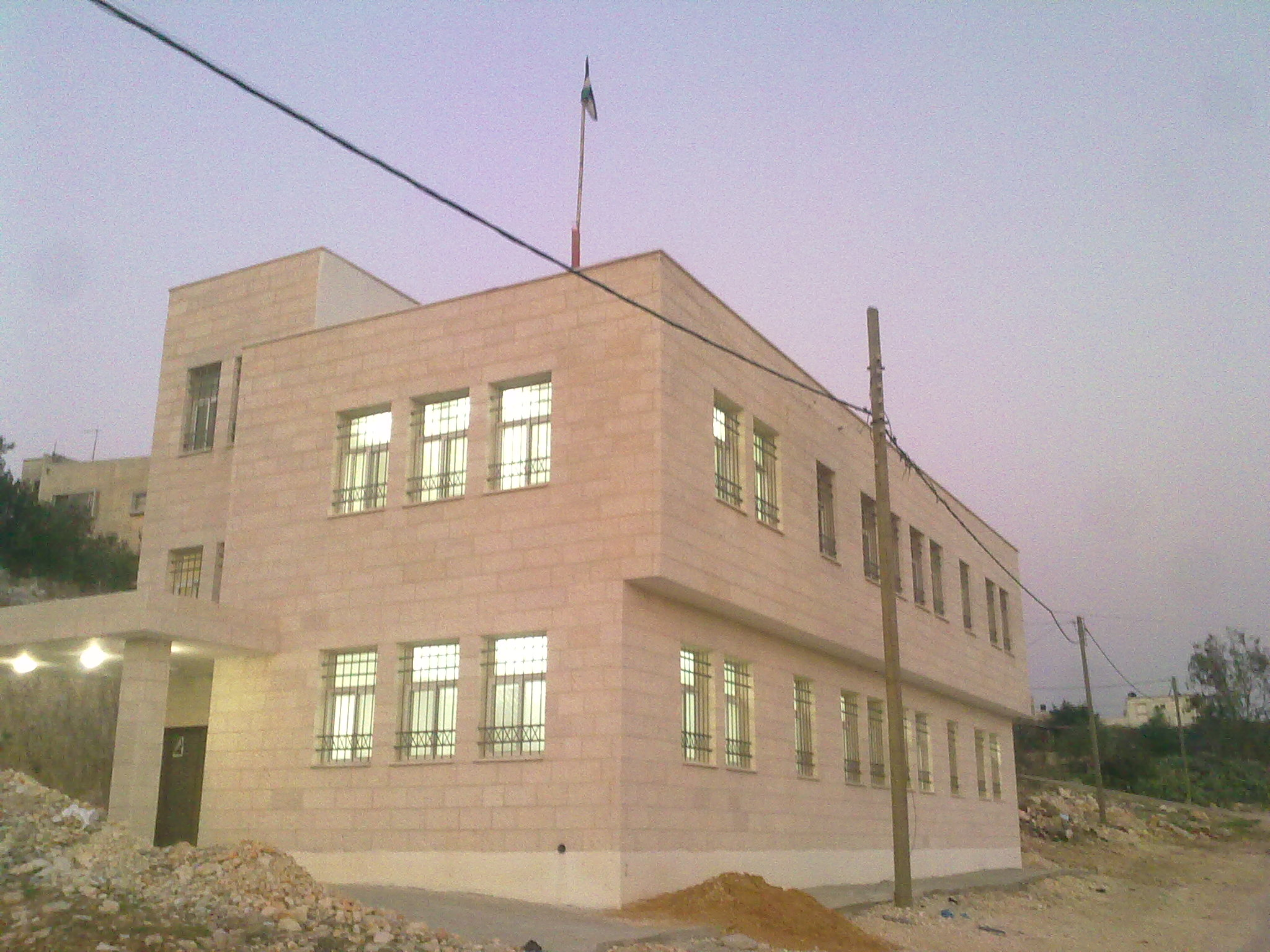
- Shufa Village Council

- Location of Shufa within Palestine
- Coordinates: 32°16′29″N 35°04′59″E
- Palestine grid: 157/186
- State: State of Palestine
- Governorate: Tulkarm

Government
  - Type: Village council

Population (2017)
  - Total: 1,350
- Name meaning: "a harrow", or "polishing"

Shufa (Arabic: شوفه) is a Palestinian village in the Tulkarm Governorate in the eastern West Bank, located 6 kilometers South-east of Tulkarm. According to the Palestinian Central Bureau of Statistics, Shufa had a population of approximately 1,253 inhabitants in mid-year 2006 and 1,350 by 2017. 5.4% of the population of Shufa were refugees in 1997. The healthcare facilities for Shufa are at Kafr al-Labad or Saffarin where the facilities are designated as MOH level 2.

== History ==
Ceramics from the Byzantine era have been found here.

=== Ottoman era ===
Shufa, like all of Palestine was incorporated into the Ottoman Empire in 1517. In the 1596 tax registers, it was named Sufa, part of the nahiya ("subdistrict") of Jabal Sami, part of the larger Sanjak of Nablus. It had a population of 8 households, all Muslims. The inhabitants paid a fixed tax rate of 33,3% on agricultural products, including wheat, barley, summer crops, olive trees, goats and beehives, in addition to occasional revenues and a press for olive oil or grape syrup, and a fixed tax for people of Nablus area; a total of 3,202 akçe.

In 1838, it was noted as a village, Shaufeh in the Wady esh-Sha'ir district, west of Nablus.

In the 1860s, the Ottoman authorities granted the village an agricultural plot of land called Ghabat Shufa in the former confines of the Forest of Arsur (Ar. Al-Ghaba) in the coastal plain, west of the village.

In 1870 Victor Guérin noted the village on a hilltop, and taking it as equal importance as Saffarin.

In 1870/1871 (1288 AH), an Ottoman census listed the village in the nahiya (sub-district) of Wadi al-Sha'ir.

In 1882 the PEF's Survey of Western Palestine (SWP) described Shufeh as: "A small stone village, in a strong position on a ridge, with steep slopes north and south. It is supplied by a well in the village, and has a few olives below it. A good view is obtained from it over the plain, and the country north and south, as well as to the range north of Sebustieh."

Around the turn of the 20th century, Shufa was one of the villages in which the Hannun Family of Tulkarm/Saffarin owned extensive estates. The Hannuns fostered close ties with the clans inhabiting the village.

=== British Mandate era ===
In the 1922 census of Palestine conducted by the British Mandate authorities, Shufeh had a population of 207 Muslims, increasing in the 1931 census to 259 Muslims, living in 47 houses.

In the 1945 statistics the population of Shufa was 370 Muslims, with 11,690 dunams of land according to an official land and population survey. Of this, 4,315 dunams were used for cereals, while 6 dunams were built-up (urban) land.

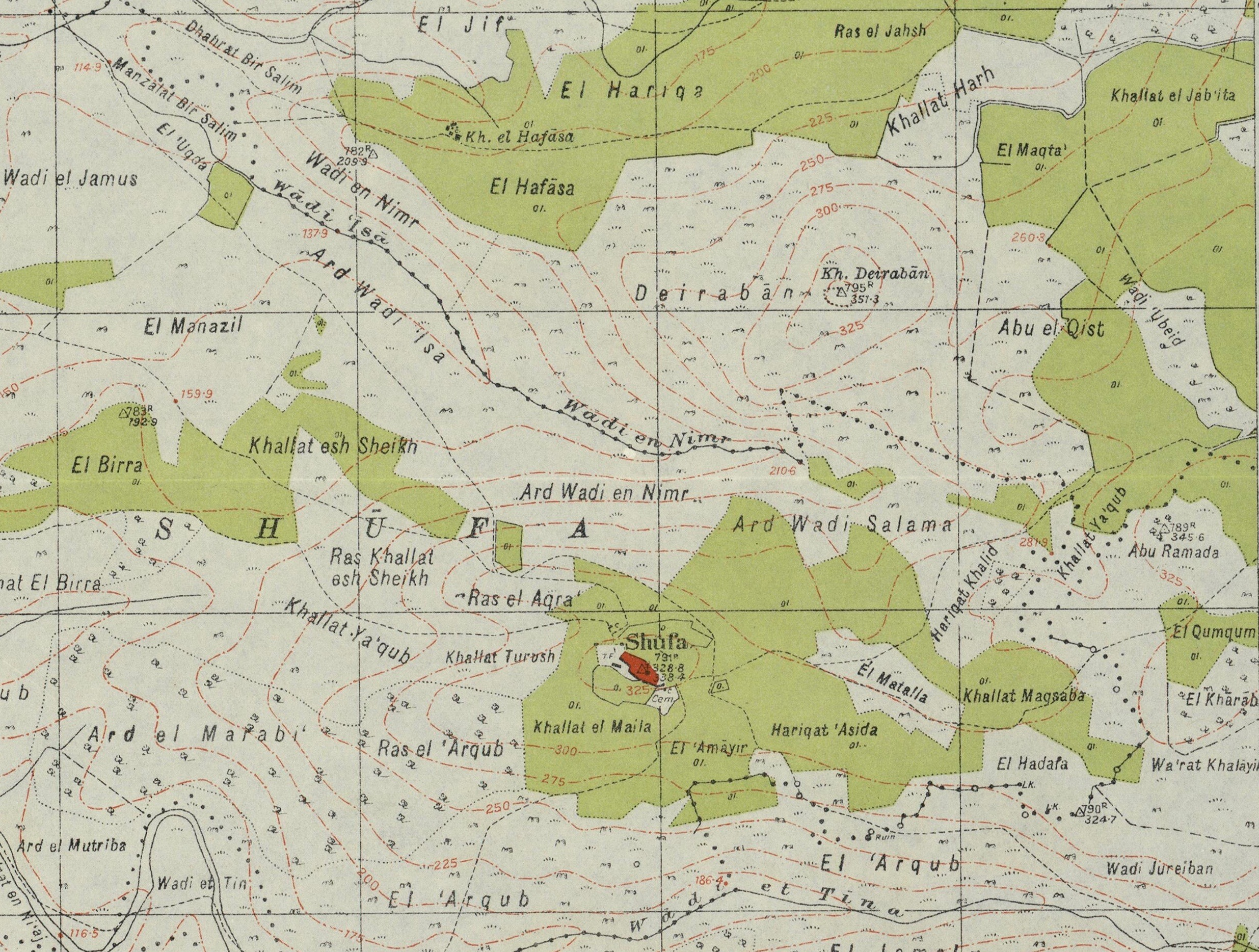
Shufa 1942 1:20,000

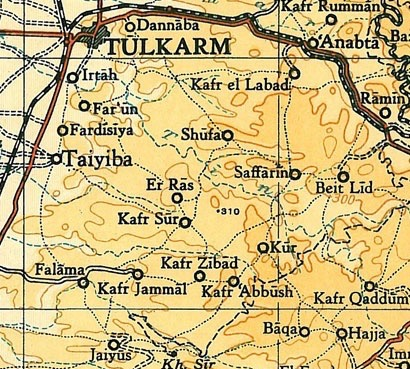
Shufa 1945 1:250,000

=== Jordanian era ===
In the wake of the 1948 Arab–Israeli War, and after the 1949 Armistice Agreements, Shufa came under Jordanian rule.

In 1961, the population was 503.

=== Post 1967 ===
Since the Six-Day War in 1967, Shufa has been under Israeli occupation.

=== See also ===
- Peasants' revolt in Palestine
- Omer Goldman
- List of violent incidents in the Israeli–Palestinian conflict, January–June 2015

== Bibliography ==
- Barron, J.B., ed. (1923). Palestine: Report and General Abstracts of the Census of 1922. Government of Palestine.
- Conder, C.R.; Kitchener, H.H. (1882). The Survey of Western Palestine: Memoirs of the Topography, Orography, Hydrography, and Archaeology. Vol. 2. London: Committee of the Palestine Exploration Fund.
- Dauphin, C. (1998). La Palestine byzantine, Peuplement et Populations. BAR International Series 726 (in French). Vol. III : Catalogue. Oxford: Archeopress. ISBN 0-860549-05-4.
- Government of Jordan, Department of Statistics (1964). First Census of Population and Housing. Volume I: Final Tables; General Characteristics of the Population (PDF).
- Government of Palestine, Department of Statistics (1945). Village Statistics, April, 1945.
- Guérin, V. (1875). Description Géographique Historique et Archéologique de la Palestine (in French). Vol. 2: Samarie, pt. 2. Paris: L'Imprimerie Nationale.
- Hadawi, S. (1970). Village Statistics of 1945: A Classification of Land and Area ownership in Palestine. Palestine Liberation Organization Research Center.
- Hütteroth, W.-D.; Abdulfattah, K. (1977). Historical Geography of Palestine, Transjordan and Southern Syria in the Late 16th Century. Erlanger Geographische Arbeiten, Sonderband 5. Erlangen, Germany: Vorstand der Fränkischen Geographischen Gesellschaft. ISBN 3-920405-41-2.
- Mills, E., ed. (1932). Census of Palestine 1931. Population of Villages, Towns and Administrative Areas. Jerusalem: Government of Palestine.
- Palmer, E.H. (1881). The Survey of Western Palestine: Arabic and English Name Lists Collected During the Survey by Lieutenants Conder and Kitchener, R. E. Transliterated and Explained by E.H. Palmer. Committee of the Palestine Exploration Fund.
- Robinson, E.; Smith, E. (1841). Biblical Researches in Palestine, Mount Sinai and Arabia Petraea: A Journal of Travels in the year 1838. Vol. 3. Boston: Crocker & Brewster.
