= Majdal Bani Fadil =

- Municipality type D (Village council)

Arabic transcription(s)
  - Arabic: مجدل بني فاضل
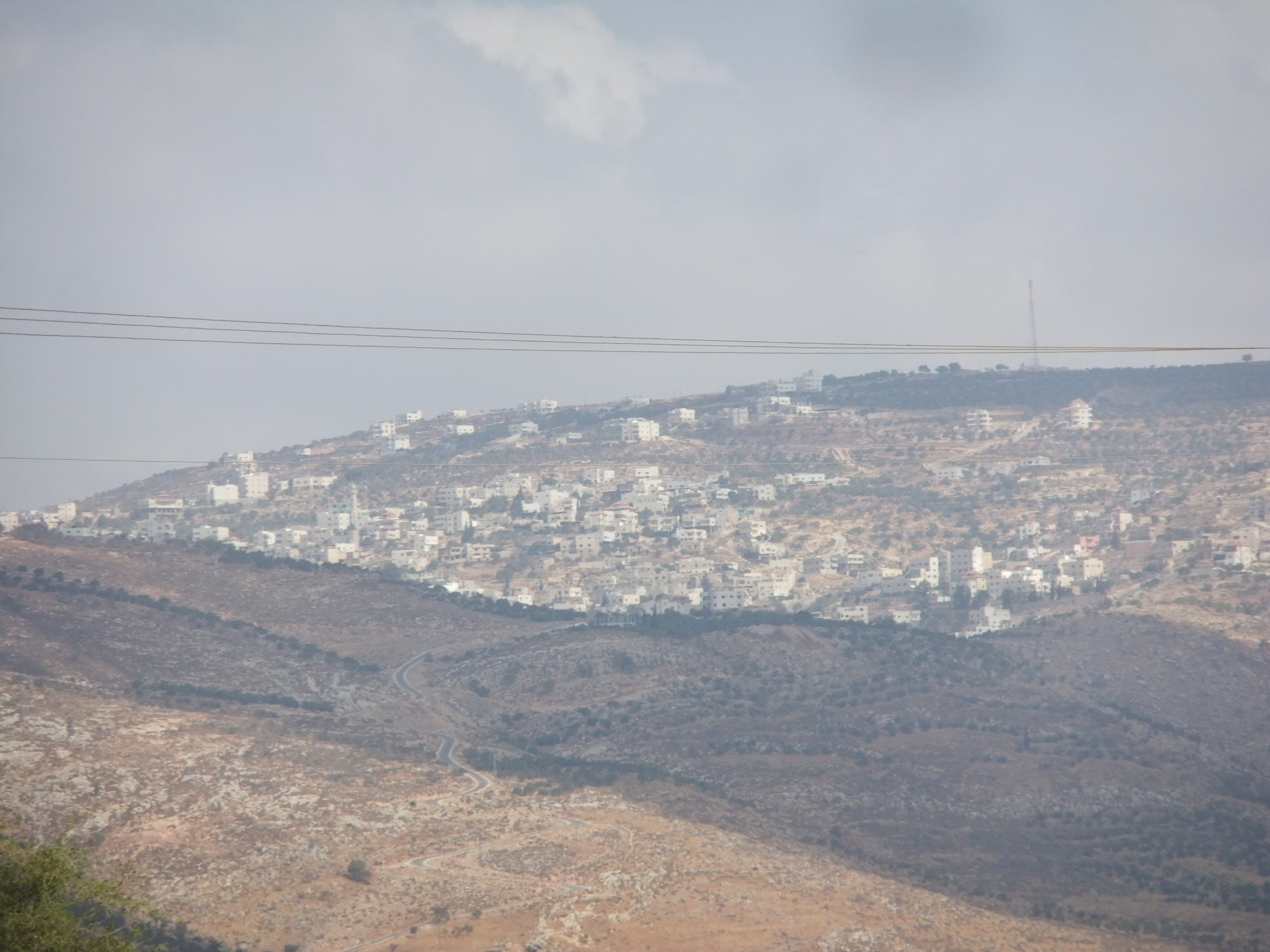
- Majdal Bani Fadil

- Location of Majdal Bani Fadil within Palestine Location of Majdal Bani Fadil within the West Bank
- Coordinates: 32°05′01″N 35°21′46″E
- Palestine grid: 184/165
- State: State of Palestine
- Governorate: Nablus

Government
  - Type: Village council
  - Head of Municipality: Walid Othman

Area
  - Total: 28.0 km^{2} (10.8 sq mi)

Population (2017)
  - Total: 2,907
  - Density: 104/km^{2} (269/sq mi)
- Name meaning: The watch tower of the Beni Fadil (an Arab clan)

Majdal Bani Fadil (Arabic: مجدل بني فاضل) is a Palestinian village in the Nablus Governorate of the northern West Bank, located 23 kilometers (14 mi) southeast of Nablus. According to the Palestinian Central Bureau of Statistics (PCBS), the town had a population of 2,907 in 2017. Majdal Bani Fadil is under the administration of a nine-member village council headed by Walid Othman. The main economic activities are herding and agriculture, specifically olives, grapes, prunes and figs. The main road connecting Majdal Bani Fadil to Ramallah and Nablus and Jericho has been closed off to the village since 2000 during the Second Intifada.

== Location ==
Majdal Bani Fadil is located east of Qusra, north of Duma, west of al-Jiftlik and south of Jurish.

== History ==
Sherds from Iron Age II, Hellenistic/Roman, Byzantine, Crusader/Ayyubid and Mamluk periods have been found in the village.

=== Ottoman period ===
In 1517, the village became part of the Ottoman Empire with the rest of Palestine, and potsherds from the early Ottoman period have been found there. It appeared in the 1596 tax-records as, Majdal, located in the Nahiya of Jabal Qubal of the Liwa of Nablus. The population was 18 households, all Muslim. They paid a fixed tax rate of 33.3% on agricultural products, such as wheat, barley, summer crops, olive trees, goats and beehives, in addition to occasional revenues and a fixed tax for people of Nablus area; a total of 1,450 akçe.

In 1838 Edward Robinson noted Majdel Bani Fadil was located in the Beitawy district, east of Nablus, while in 1852 C.W.M. van de Velde noted "large old hewn stones prove sufficiently that here was once an ancient site". The inhabitants had a few tobacco−gardens and olive−trees, and the view of the Jordan Valley from the village was "truly magnificent", according to van de Velde.

In 1870 the Victor Guérin noted: "I found here two small and ancient columns. Numerous cisterns, caverns, and rock-cut tombs prove the antiquity of the site, the ancient name of which was doubtless Migdal. I also examined a very curious excavation here, called el Kaf. It is of square form, and measures 26 feet 2 inches on each side. It is three-quarters fallen in, and offers this peculiarity-that those portions of wall still visible are provided on the inside with small niches, some triangular and some vaulted, cut at equal distances and in rows." He further remarked that in the little mosque called Nabi Yahia, there were two antique reused columns. In 1882, the Palestine Exploration Fund's Survey of Western Palestine (SWP) described it as "a small village on the top of a hill, with olives on the south and west, and a small sacred place on the south-east. On the east are caves, and there are tombs and rock-cut cisterns near the village."

=== British Mandate period ===
In the 1922 census of Palestine conducted by the British Mandate authorities, Majdal had a population of 199 Muslims, increasing in the 1931 census to 310, still all Muslims, in a total of 70 houses. In the 1945 statistics Majdal Bani Fadil had a population of 430 Muslims and a total of 28,022 dunams of land, according to an official land and population survey. Of this, 1,131 dunams were plantations and irrigable land, 6,994 used for cereals, while 36 dunams were built-up land.

=== Jordanian period ===
In the wake of the 1948 Arab–Israeli War, and after the 1949 Armistice Agreements, Majdal Bani Fadil came under Jordanian rule.

The Jordanian census of 1961 found 628 inhabitants in Majdal Bani Fadil.

=== Post-Israeli occupation ===
After the Six-Day War in 1967, Majdal Bani Fadil has been under Israeli occupation. The population of Majdal Bani Fadil in the 1967 census conducted by Israel was 629, of whom 1 originated from the Israeli territory.

After the 1995 accords, 18% of village land is classified as Area B (partial Palestinian control), while the remaining 82% is Area C (full Israeli control)

In November 2025, the village came under attack by Israeli settlers during the Gaza war.

== Demography ==
Most of the village's residents belong to the Othman and Zayn ad-Din clans. The inhabitants originate from nearby as-Sawiya, purportedly having relocated there due to a feud. The tribe that settled in the village was called the Bani Fadil, hence the village's name.

== Bibliography ==
- Barron, J.B., ed. (1923). Palestine: Report and General Abstracts of the Census of 1922. Government of Palestine.
- Conder, C.R.; Kitchener, H.H. (1882). The Survey of Western Palestine: Memoirs of the Topography, Orography, Hydrography, and Archaeology. Vol. 2. London: Committee of the Palestine Exploration Fund.
- Dauphin, C. (1998). La Palestine byzantine, Peuplement et Populations. BAR International Series 726 (in French). Vol. III : Catalogue. Oxford: Archeopress. ISBN 0-860549-05-4.
- Finkelstein, I.; Lederman, Zvi, eds. (1997). Highlands of many cultures. Vol. 1. Tel Aviv: Institute of Archaeology of Tel Aviv University Publications Section. ISBN 965-440-007-3.
- Government of Jordan, Department of Statistics (1964). First Census of Population and Housing. Volume I: Final Tables; General Characteristics of the Population (PDF).
- Government of Palestine, Department of Statistics (1945). Village Statistics, April, 1945.
- Guérin, V. (1875). Description Géographique Historique et Archéologique de la Palestine (in French). Vol. 2: Samarie, pt. 2. Paris: L'Imprimerie Nationale.
- Hadawi, S. (1970). Village Statistics of 1945: A Classification of Land and Area ownership in Palestine. Palestine Liberation Organization Research Center. Archived from the original on 2018-12-08.
- Hütteroth, W.-D.; Abdulfattah, K. (1977). Historical Geography of Palestine, Transjordan and Southern Syria in the Late 16th Century. Erlanger Geographische Arbeiten, Sonderband 5. Erlangen, Germany: Vorstand der Fränkischen Geographischen Gesellschaft. ISBN 3-920405-41-2.
- Mills, E., ed. (1932). Census of Palestine 1931. Population of Villages, Towns and Administrative Areas. Jerusalem: Government of Palestine.
- Palmer, E.H. (1881). The Survey of Western Palestine: Arabic and English Name Lists Collected During the Survey by Lieutenants Conder and Kitchener, R. E. Transliterated and Explained by E.H. Palmer. Committee of the Palestine Exploration Fund.
- Robinson, E.; Smith, E. (1841). Biblical Researches in Palestine, Mount Sinai and Arabia Petraea: A Journal of Travels in the year 1838. Vol. 3. Boston: Crocker & Brewster.
- Velde, van de, C.W.M. (1854). Narrative of a journey through Syria and Palestine in 1851 and 1852. Vol. 2. William Blackwood and son.
- Zertal, A. (2019). The Manasseh Hill Country Survey. Vol. 5. Boston: BRILL. ISBN 978-9004400863.
