= Husan =

Palestinian town in the Bethlehem Governate

- Municipality type C

Arabic transcription(s)
  - Arabic: حوسان
  - Latin: Hussan (official); Housan (unofficial)
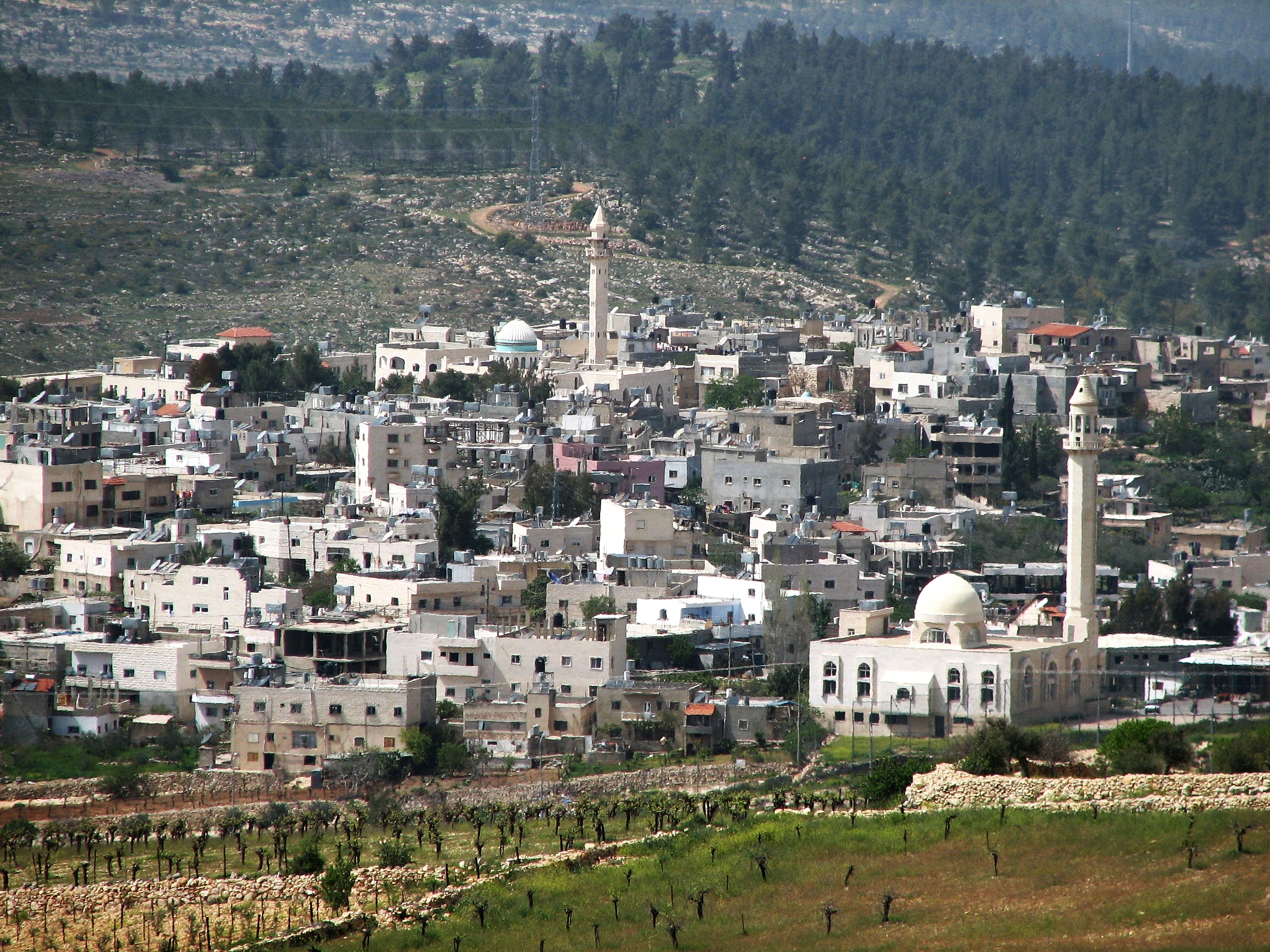
- View of Husan

- Location of Husan within Palestine Husan (the West Bank)
- Coordinates: 31°42′36″N 35°08′02″E
- Palestine grid: 162/124
- State: State of Palestine
- Governorate: Bethlehem

Government
  - Type: Municipality
  - Head of Municipality: Jamal Sabatin

Area
  - Total: 7.1 km^{2} (2.7 sq mi)

Population (2017)
  - Total: 7,048
  - Density: 990/km^{2} (2,600/sq mi)
- Name meaning: "Hovering round"

Husan (Arabic: حوسان) is a Palestinian town located 9 km (5.6 mi) west of Bethlehem, in the Bethlehem Governorate. According to the Palestinian Central Bureau of Statistics, Husan had a population of 7,048 in 2017.

Husan is located in the Seam Zone of the Israeli-occupied West Bank, such that it is separated from the rest of the West Bank by the Israeli West Bank barrier.

== Etymology ==
In Arabic, husan means "goodness and beauty". The name may also be derived from Hassan monastery, which later became Husan. In 1881, Edward Henry Palmer wrote that it came from "hovering round".

== History ==
The oldest remains found in the village date back to the Iron Age. Other remains date from the post-Babylonian captivity period and the Middle Ages. The original inhabitants came from the Arabian Peninsula and Yemen in the 3rd century. Ceramics from the Byzantine era have been found here.

=== Ottoman era ===
Husan, like the rest of Palestine, was incorporated into the Ottoman Empire in 1517, and in the census of 1596, the village appeared in the tax registers as being in the Nahiya of Quds of the Liwa of Quds. It had an all-Muslim population of 12 households and paid taxes on wheat, barley, summer crops, vineyards and fruit trees, vegetable and fruit garden, orchard, occasional revenues, goats and/or beehives.

In 1838 it was noted as a Muslim village in the District of el-'Arkub; Southwest of Jerusalem.

When Victor Guérin first passed by Husan in June 1863, he noted that it was located on a mountain. Later, in August the same year, he found that it contained only a small number of people, with houses grouped around a tower.

An Ottoman village list from about 1870 found that Husan had a population of 115, in 28 houses, though the population count included men only. Husan was listed as a plain village in the Hebron District to the West of Solomon's Pools.

In 1883, the PEF's Survey of Western Palestine described Hausan as a small stone village on a flat ridge, with a steep valley to the north and a well to the south.

In 1896 the population of Husan was estimated to be about 258 persons.

=== British Mandate era ===
In the 1922 census of Palestine, conducted by the British Mandate authorities, Husan had an all-Muslim population of 396, 219 males and 177 females. This had increased in the 1931 census to a total of 540, still all-Muslim, in 122 houses.

In the 1945 statistics the population of Husan was 770, all Muslims, who owned 7,252 dunams (725.2 ha; 1,792 acres) of land according to an official land and population survey. Of this, 1,972 dunams (197.2 ha; 487 acres) were for cereals, while 37 dunams (3.7 ha; 9.1 acres) were built-up (urban) land.

=== Jordanian era ===
In the wake of the 1948 Arab–Israeli War, and after the 1949 Armistice Agreements, Husan came under Jordanian rule.

In 1961, the population of Husan was 1,073.

=== Post-1967 ===
Since the Six-Day War in 1967, Husan has been under Israeli occupation. As a result of the restrictions following the occupation, many people in Husan have become unemployed, and the economic situation has severely declined, forcing many to work in the service sector and in agriculture to earn a living. Since 1996, Husan has been governed by a village council which is currently administrated by ten members appointed by the Palestinian Authority. Under the Oslo Accords, 7.2% of Husan's land was classified as Area B, the remaining 92.8% as Area C.

The population in the 1967 census conducted by the Israeli authorities was 1,149. In 1978, Husan had a total land area of 7,134 dunams (713.4 ha; 1,763 acres). Since the establishment of Betar Illit and land expropriations by the Israel Defense Forces, the town has been downsized to 1,425 1,425 dunams (142.5 ha; 352 acres).

On October 27, 1996, Hilmi Shusha, a 10 or 11-year-old Palestinian boy was beaten unconscious by an Israeli settler, after an incidence of alleged stone-throwing at passing vehicles. He died of his injuries the following day. In the months of January and February 2017, regional highway 375 nearest Husan was again the scene of frequent stone-throwing at passing Israeli motorists with some injuries reported. The incidents led to measures by the IDF to ensure the safety of Israelis driving in the area.

== Education ==
In 2009, there were five public schools in Husan, two for girls and three for boys, run by the Palestinian Ministry of Higher Education.

== Bibliography ==
- Barron, J.B., ed. (1923). Palestine: Report and General Abstracts of the Census of 1922. Government of Palestine.
- Conder, C.R.; Kitchener, H.H. (1883). The Survey of Western Palestine: Memoirs of the Topography, Orography, Hydrography, and Archaeology. Vol. 3. London: Committee of the Palestine Exploration Fund.
- Dauphin, C. (1998). La Palestine byzantine, Peuplement et Populations. BAR International Series 726 (in French). Vol. III : Catalogue. Oxford: Archeopress. ISBN 0-860549-05-4.
- Government of Jordan, Department of Statistics (1964). First Census of Population and Housing. Volume I: Final Tables; General Characteristics of the Population (PDF).
- Government of Palestine, Department of Statistics (1945). Village Statistics, April, 1945.
- Guérin, V. (1869). Description Géographique Historique et Archéologique de la Palestine (in French). Vol. 1: Judee, pt. 2. Paris: L'Imprimerie Nationale.
- Guérin, V. (1869). Description Géographique Historique et Archéologique de la Palestine (in French). Vol. 1: Judee, pt. 3. Paris: L'Imprimerie Nationale.
- Hadawi, S. (1970). Village Statistics of 1945: A Classification of Land and Area ownership in Palestine. Palestine Liberation Organization Research Center.
- Hartmann, M. (1883). "Die Ortschaftenliste des Liwa Jerusalem in dem türkischen Staatskalender für Syrien auf das Jahr 1288 der Flucht (1871)". Zeitschrift des Deutschen Palästina-Vereins. 6: 102–149.
- Hütteroth, W.-D.; Abdulfattah, K. (1977). Historical Geography of Palestine, Transjordan and Southern Syria in the Late 16th Century. Erlanger Geographische Arbeiten, Sonderband 5. Erlangen, Germany: Vorstand der Fränkischen Geographischen Gesellschaft. ISBN 3-920405-41-2.
- Mills, E., ed. (1932). Census of Palestine 1931. Population of Villages, Towns and Administrative Areas. Jerusalem: Government of Palestine.
- Palmer, E.H. (1881). The Survey of Western Palestine: Arabic and English Name Lists Collected During the Survey by Lieutenants Conder and Kitchener, R. E. Transliterated and Explained by E.H. Palmer. Committee of the Palestine Exploration Fund.
- Robinson, E.; Smith, E. (1841). Biblical Researches in Palestine, Mount Sinai and Arabia Petraea: A Journal of Travels in the year 1838. Vol. 2. Boston: Crocker & Brewster.
- Robinson, E.; Smith, E. (1841). Biblical Researches in Palestine, Mount Sinai and Arabia Petraea: A Journal of Travels in the year 1838. Vol. 3. Boston: Crocker & Brewster.
- Schick, C. (1896). "Zur Einwohnerzahl des Bezirks Jerusalem". Zeitschrift des Deutschen Palästina-Vereins. 19: 120–127.
- Socin, A. (1879). "Alphabetisches Verzeichniss von Ortschaften des Paschalik Jerusalem". Zeitschrift des Deutschen Palästina-Vereins. 2: 135–163.
