= Kafr al-Labad =

- Municipality type C

Arabic transcription(s)
  - Arabic: كفراللبد
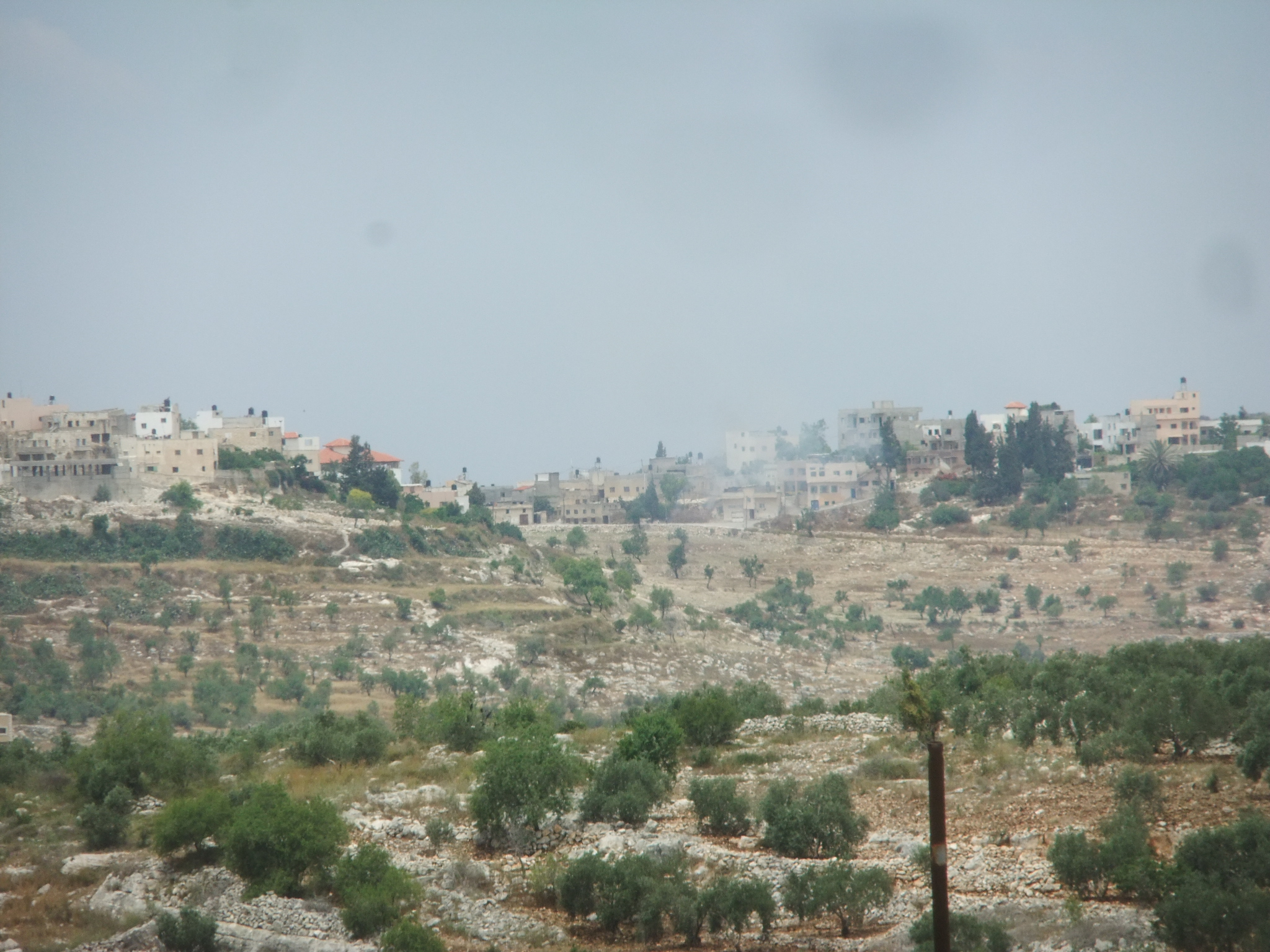
- Kafr al-Labad, from the east

- Location of Kafr al-Labad within Palestine
- Coordinates: 32°17′51″N 35°06′34″E
- Palestine grid: 160/189
- State: State of Palestine
- Governorate: Tulkarm

Government
  - Type: Municipality

Area
  - Total: 11.9 km^{2} (4.6 sq mi)

Population (2017)
  - Total: 4,747
  - Density: 399/km^{2} (1,030/sq mi)
- Name meaning: The village of the felt-cloth

Kafr al-Labad (Arabic: كفراللبد) is a Palestinian village in the Tulkarm Governorate in the northeastern West Bank, located 9 kilometers east of Tulkarm and two kilometers south of Anabta. Its population in 2017 was 4,747 according to the Palestinian Central Bureau of Statistics. It has a total land area of 11,917 dunams, of which 25% is used for agricultural purposes. The town's main agricultural products are olives, fruits and wheat.

== History ==
Byzantine ceramics have been found here.

=== Ottoman era ===
Kafr al-Labad, like all of Palestine, was incorporated into the Ottoman Empire in 1517. In the 1596 tax registers, Kafr al-Labad was part of the nahiya ("subdistrict") of Jabal Sami, part of the larger Sanjak of Nablus. It had a population of 57 households and 6 bachelors, all Muslims. The inhabitants paid a fixed tax rate of 33,3% on agricultural products, including wheat, barley, summer crops, olive trees, goats and beehives, in addition to occasional revenues; a total of 6,500 akçe.

In 1863 Victor Guérin visited, and found: 'the ruins of an ancient town, which is nowhere mentioned, at least under this name, in the sacred books. Important remains still exist, such as the lower courses of several buildings of cut stone, lying, with much regularity and without cement, upon each other. One of these, of rectangular form, and built east and west, measures 22 paces in length and 15 in breadth. The door was ornamented with monolith pilasters, still standing.

Another similar building belonging to this is somewhat smaller, but at a little distance is found a third more considerable, and built north and south, 50 paces long by 25 broad. There are two entrances, one on the north, with a circular arch, and the other on the south, rectangular. Within the enclosure, entirely constructed of cut stone of good dressing, and not cemented, runs a long court, with several parallel halls, whose partition walls show the same character as the wall of the external enclosure. Other buildings, also in cut stone, and partly overthrown, strew the soil with materials scattered or lying in heaps. Here and there are cisterns cut in the rock.’

In 1870/1871 (1288 AH), an Ottoman census listed the village in the nahiya (sub-district) of Wadi al-Sha'ir.

In 1882, the PEF's Survey of Western Palestine described Kefr el Lebad as “A small stone village on high ground, with a few olives. The valley to the north, near 'Anebta, flows with water in spring.”

Around the turn of the 20th century, Kafr al-Labad was one of the villages in which the Hannun Family of Tulkarm/Saffarin owned extensive estates. The Hannuns fostered close ties with the clans inhabiting the village.

=== British Mandate era ===
In the 1922 census of Palestine conducted by the British Mandate authorities, Kufr Labad had a population of 540, all Muslims, increasing in the 1931 census to 663 persons, all Muslim except 1 Christian, living in 167 houses.

In the early 1930s, Grace Mary Crowfoot noted how the women of Kafr al-Labad and Al Jib made pottery (without a wheel), looking much like ware made in the 8th and 7th BCE.

In the 1945 statistics the population of Kafr el Labad was 940, all Muslims, who owned 14,757 dunams of land according to an official land and population survey. 5,587 dunams were plantations and irrigable land, 2,257 used for cereals, while 18 dunams were built-up (urban) land.

=== Jordanian era ===
In the wake of the 1948 Arab–Israeli War, and after the 1949 Armistice Agreements, Kafr al-Labad came under Jordanian rule.

In 1961, the population of Kafr Labad was 1,126.

=== Post-1967 ===
Since the Six-Day War in 1967, Kafr al-Labad has been under Israeli occupation. In 1995, the Israeli military confiscated about 200 dunams of Kafr al-Labad's lands to enlarge the nearby Israeli settlement of Avnei Hefetz. In total, about 355 dunams of Kafr al-Labad's lands have been added to Avnei Hefetz, while an additional 20 have been confiscated for the settlement of Einav.

== Bibliography ==
- Barron, J.B., ed. (1923). Palestine: Report and General Abstracts of the Census of 1922. Government of Palestine.
- Conder, C.R.; Kitchener, H.H. (1882). The Survey of Western Palestine: Memoirs of the Topography, Orography, Hydrography, and Archaeology. Vol. 2. London: Committee of the Palestine Exploration Fund.
- Crowfoot, G.M. (1932). "Pots, ancient and modern". Palestine Exploration Fund Quarterly Statement: 179–187.
- Dauphin, C. (1998). La Palestine byzantine, Peuplement et Populations. BAR International Series 726 (in French). Vol. III : Catalogue. Oxford: Archeopress. doi:10.30861/9780860549055. ISBN 0-860549-05-4.
- Government of Jordan, Department of Statistics (1964). First Census of Population and Housing. Volume I: Final Tables; General Characteristics of the Population (PDF).
- Government of Palestine, Department of Statistics (1945). Village Statistics, April, 1945.
- Guérin, V. (1875). Description Géographique Historique et Archéologique de la Palestine (in French). Vol. 2: Samarie, pt. 2. Paris: L'Imprimerie Nationale.
- Hadawi, S. (1970). Village Statistics of 1945: A Classification of Land and Area ownership in Palestine. Palestine Liberation Organization Research Center.
- Hütteroth, W.-D.; Abdulfattah, K. (1977). Historical Geography of Palestine, Transjordan and Southern Syria in the Late 16th Century. Erlanger Geographische Arbeiten, Sonderband 5. Erlangen, Germany: Vorstand der Fränkischen Geographischen Gesellschaft. ISBN 3-920405-41-2.
- Mills, E., ed. (1932). Census of Palestine 1931. Population of Villages, Towns and Administrative Areas. Jerusalem: Government of Palestine.
- Palmer, E.H. (1881). The Survey of Western Palestine: Arabic and English Name Lists Collected During the Survey by Lieutenants Conder and Kitchener, R. E. Transliterated and Explained by E.H. Palmer. Committee of the Palestine Exploration Fund.
- al-Salim, Farid (Autumn 2011). "Landed Property and Elite Conflict in Ottoman Tulkarm". Jerusalem Quarterly (47). doi:10.70190/jq.I47.p65.
