= Timeline of the Gaza war (13 July 2024 – 26 September 2024) =

- Initial attacks; (7–27 October 2023); Invasion of the Gaza Strip; (28 October 2023 – 23 November 2023); First ceasefire; (24 November 2023 – 11 January 2024); Yemen airstrikes; (12 January 2024 – 6 May 2024); Rafah offensive; (7 May 2024 – 12 July 2024); Al-Mawasi attack; (13 July 2024 – 26 September 2024); Attack on Hezbollah headquarters; (27 September 2024 – 16 October 2024); Killing of Yahya Sinwar; (17 October 2024 – 26 November 2024); Israel–Lebanon ceasefire agreement; (27 November 2024 – 18 January 2025); Israel–Hamas ceasefire agreement; (19 January 2025 – 17 March 2025); March 2025 Israeli attacks on the Gaza Strip; (18 March 2025 – 15 May 2025); May 2025 Gaza offensive; (16 May 2025 – 19 August 2025); August 2025 Gaza offensive; (20 August 2025 – 2 October 2025); October 2025 Israel–Hamas ceasefire agreement; (3 October 2025 – present)

== July 2024 ==
=== 13 July ===
- The Gaza Health Ministry reported that at least 98 Palestinians were killed in Israeli attacks in the past 48 hours, bringing its count of the Palestinian death toll to 38,443. (Note: Casualty count includes both militants and civilians. For further information see Casualties of the Gaza war § Civilian to combatant ratio.)
- Palestinian health officials said that at least 90 Palestinians were killed in Israeli airstrikes in an area of al-Mawasi, allegedly targeting Hamas leaders Mohammed Deif and Rafa Salama.
- Al Jazeera reported that two men were killed in an Israeli drone strike on their car in the town of Khardali, Lebanon. The dead were allegedly the father and uncle of a Hezbollah militant previously killed by Israel. A politician of the Amal Movement was killed by a separate IDF attack in the town.
- Al Jazeera reported that at least 22 people were killed and 20 injured after Israeli forces strike hit a prayer room of a ruined mosque in the Al-Shati refugee camp. Among the dead was Abu Muhammad, commander of the Gaza Brigade, and Nimr Hamida, who was sentenced to six life sentences for fatal shooting attack and got released in the 2011 exchange deal.
- The Javier Milei government in Argentina designated Hamas a terrorist organisation and froze its assets.
- Hezbollah attacked Israel ten times, launching 30 rockets at the Kiryat Shmona area in three of the attacks, with most of them intercepted by Israel.
  - Two emergency squad members were injured by rockets.
  - Four female soldiers were injured and damage was caused property and infrastructure.
  - Hezbollah's Falaq rockets hit the Israeli community of Ma’ayan Baruch.
  - Four Israelis were injured from a rocket barrage on Kiryat Shmona.
  - a Home in Margalit suffered a direct rocket hit.
- The IDF reported hitting:
  - a Hamas platoon commander who took part in Hamas activities throughout Gaza and directed the transfer of funds disguised as humanitarian activity.
  - a Hamas facility that stored paragliders from the 7 October attacks.
- The IDF reported successfully intercepting two aerial targets headed towards Eilat from the east.
- A proxy of Hezbollah called "Saraya" acknowledged attacking Shebba Farms. Two of Saraya's militant were reportedly killed in the attack.

=== 14 July ===
- The Gaza Health Ministry reported that at least 141 Palestinians were killed in Israeli attacks in the past 24 hours, bringing its count of the Palestinian death toll to 38,584.
- Al Jazeera reported that one person was killed and four children were injured after Israeli forces hit a house belonging to the Abu Yousef family in the Abu Eskandar area of the Sheikh Radwan neighborhood.
- Wafa reported that five people were injured after Israeli forces strike hit a house belonging to the Shurrab family in the Salaam neighborhood, south of Khan Yunis.
- Al Jazeera reported that Israeli forces raided an apartment building in Wadi al-Joz, occupied East Jerusalem, cutting its electricity before demolishing the building that stood for almost a century.
- Al Jazeera reported that four people were killed and three injured after Israeli forces hit a residential building in Gaza City.
- A Palestinian rammed his car into people at the Nir Tzvi junction, wounding four, out of which one has died 2 weeks later. The ramming driver was killed in the incident.
- Israeli airstrikes hit houses in Gaza City killed at least 17 people and injured over 50 others.
- Al Jazeera reported that Israeli forces strikes in the UNRWA-run Abu Oreiban School in the Nuseirat refugee camp killed at least 17 people and injured over 80 people. The IDF said the location was a hideout for several terrorists and operational infrastructure to attack IDF troops.
- The Al-Quds Brigades claimed multiple attacks on IDF positions in Rafah and a command center in the Netzarim Corridor, as well as in areas of al-Abd Jaber, al-Tu’ma and Burj al-Asi, all southwest of the Yibna refugee camp.
- Hezbollah claimed attacks on Israeli soldiers near Hadab Yarin, a "newly created 91st Division headquarters" in Ayelet HaShahar, Ruwaisaat al-Alam and Ramtha in occupied Kfarchouba.
- Israeli forces strikes were reported in the Lebanese towns of Meiss Ej Jabal, Aita al-Shaab, Bani Haiyyan and Hula.
- Israeli forces raided the West Bank towns of Anabta, Kafr al-Labad, Umm Dar and Silwad.

=== 15 July ===
- The Gaza Health Ministry reported that at least 80 Palestinians were killed in Israeli attacks in the past 24 hours, bringing its count of the Palestinian death toll to 38,664.
- Three ships in the Red Sea, including the oil tanker Chios Lion and the cargo vessel Bentley I, were targeted by the Houthi movement using rockets, drones, and booby-trapped boats.
- Israeli forces bombed a house in the Maghazi refugee camp, killing four people.
- Israeli forces displaced a family of 50 after demolishing four houses belonging to the al-Araj family in the town of al-Walaja, south of occupied East Jerusalem.
- Three civilians were killed in an Israeli airstrike in Bint Jbeil, southern Lebanon.
- Muhammad Baraa Katerji, a Syrian businessman who was also an associate of President Bashar al-Assad, was killed along with his assistant in an Israeli drone strike near Al-Sabboura, Syria.
- Israeli forces killed three people including a child after bombing a house in the as-Salam Street in Deir el-Balah.
- One person was killed after Israeli forces bombed Kafr al-Mashrou, east of Rafah.
- Israeli forces mistakenly opened fire on a car they believed carried Palestinians in the West Bank, injuring two Israeli civilians.
- Israeli forces shot and seriously injured a Palestinian boy in Al-Shuyoukh Al-Arroub, north of Hebron.

=== 16 July ===
- The Gaza Health Ministry reported that at least 49 Palestinians were killed in Israeli attacks in the past 24 hours, bringing its count of the Palestinian death toll to 38,713.
- Israeli forces bombed the UNRWA-run Al-Razi School in the Nuseirat refugee camp, killing 25 people and injuring 73 more.
- Israeli forces bombed tents belonging to displaced families in the Attar area of the Mawasi UNRWA refugee camp, killing 18 people and injuring 26 more.
- A Palestinian man was shot dead by Israeli forces during a raid in Al-Bireh, West Bank.
- Israeli forces shot two Palestinians while raiding the Balata refugee camp.
- In the West Bank, Israeli forces arrested three men in the Arroub refugee camp north of Hebron, two men in Sa'ir, northeast of Hebron, one man in Deir Sammit, southwest of Hebron, one man from as-Samu, south of Hebron and another man from the village of Abu Nujaym, southeast of Bethlehem.
- A shootout near Nablus between Palestinians and Israeli settlers left three settlers injured.
- Israeli forces bombed a house in az-Zawayda, killing two people.
- Israeli settlers built an iron structure on private Palestinian land in the Tel Rumeida area of Hebron.
- Two people were injured after Israeli forces struck a motorcycle with missiles along the Nabatieh-Khardali road at the Zafateh-Arnoun town junction.
- Three Syrian children were killed in an Israeli airstrike on agricultural land in Umm al-Tut, Lebanon.
- The Liberia-flagged oil tanker Chios Lion was hit by a Houthi unmanned watercraft on the Red Sea.
- Israeli forces raided the towns of Ya'bad, Arrabeh, Faqqua and Jalbun in Jenin Governorate.
- More than 60 people including civilians were killed in Israeli strikes allegedly targeting Hamas militants and a PIJ commander including in an Israeli forces designated "safe zone" for civilians in Gaza.

=== 17 July ===
- The Gaza Health Ministry reported that at least 81 Palestinians were killed in Israeli attacks in the past 24 hours, bringing its count of the Palestinian death toll to 38,794.
- Al jazeera reported that Israeli forces bombed a house in az-Zawayda, killing eight people, three people were killed by two separate attacks on the same town.
- Al jazeera reported that five people were killed after Israeli forces bombed a house in Abasan al-Kabira, east of Khan Yunis.
- Al jazeera reported that nine people, including three children were killed after Israeli forces bombed the Cairo School in the Remal neighbourhood.
- Al jazeera reported that two people were killed by Israeli forces in the al-Shakoush area, northwest of Rafah.
- Al jazeera reported that eight people were killed by Israeli bombing in the Nuseirat camp. Two Palestinians were killed in an attack on a mosque in Nuseirat, while another Palestinian was killed in a separate attack in the same neighbourhood.
- Al jazeera reported that Israeli authorities forced a family to demolish their own home in Issawiya, north of occupied East Jerusalem.
- Al jazeera reported that Israeli forces bombed the Abdullah Azzam Mosque in Gaza, killing two people and injuring 15.

=== 18 July ===
- The Gaza Health Ministry reported that at least 54 Palestinians were killed in Israeli attacks in the past 24 hours, bringing its count of the Palestinian death toll to 38,848.
- The Knesset adopted a resolution stating that it "firmly opposes the establishment of a Palestinian state west of Jordan".
- A soldier of the IDF 188th Armored Brigade's 53rd Battalion died from injuries sustained from a Hezbollah drone attack in June.
- Israeli National Security Minister Itamar Ben-Gvir entered the Al-Aqsa mosque with police protection.
- Israeli forces claimed to have killed two PIJ fighters including the chief of the group's naval force in Gaza.
- An Israeli drone strike on a car in Ghazzeh in Lebanon's Beqaa Governorate killed Muhammed Jabara, both the Islamic Group and Hamas have claimed that he was a commander in their organizations.
- Israeli forces dropped leaflets across the Jenin refugee camp, threatening to kill wanted young men if they did not surrender themselves.
- Israeli forces bombed a home belonging to the al-Ramli family in Palestine Square in the center of Gaza City, killing at least two girls.
- Israeli forces bombed an apartment building belonging to the Abu Rakab family in az-Zawayda, killing at least five people.
- Four children were injured after an Israeli attack on the al-Ittihad Tower in the Nuseirat refugee camp.
- Israeli forces stormed the town of Tal, south of Nablus, and arrested two Palestinian sisters. They also stormed Nablus and Aqraba, where they raided the home of a former prisoner, and arrested an unknown number of Palestinian men in Deir Abu Mash'al, north of Ramallah.
- Israeli forces raided the West Bank towns of Teqoa and al-Khader, Silwad, Fasayil, Bani Na'im, An-Nazla ash-Sharqiya, An-Nazla al-Gharbiya and An-Nazla al-Wusta.
- Israeli forces bombed the Al-Falah School in the Zeitoun neighborhood, killing two people and injuring five.
- Hezbollah claimed an attack on "new spy equipment installed on a crane at Hadab Yarin" and espionage equipment installed at a new IDF centre in Metula.
- At least four people were killed in an Israeli airstrike in the vicinity of Safad al-Batikh in southern Lebanon.
- Five people were killed after Israeli forces bombed a house in the Bureij refugee camp.
- Israeli Prime Minister Netanyahu visited troops in Rafah and said control of the Philadelphi corridor and the Rafah crossing crucial to secure the release of hostages held by Hamas.
- An Israeli airstrike on a building in Jmaijmah in southern Lebanon killed Ali Jaafar Maatouk (also known as Habib Maatouk) and another unnamed person, both of whom were senior commanders of Hezbollah's Redwan Force.

=== 19 July ===
- One person was killed and 10 others were injured in a drone attack in Tel Aviv. The Houthis claimed responsibility for the attack, stating that they had used a new type of drone called "Jaffa".
- The National Resistance Brigades claimed an attack that destroyed an Israeli armoured personnel carrier in the Kaf al-Mashrou area of Rafah.
- Hamas and the Popular Resistance Committees attacked IDF troops in al Izba, southwest of Tal al Sultan.
- Israeli forces bombed a house in Block C of the Nuseirat refugee camp, killing eight people including children and injuring 15 more. Israeli forces bombed another house in the camp, killing four, and targeted a group of people in Al-Rashid Street, killing two people.
- Israeli forces raided Rafidiya, Jabal al-Shamali, al-Maajin, the al-Hurriya street area, and al-Mureij, near Nablus. Israeli forces also raided the towns of Salim and Deir al-Hatab, destroying security cameras belonging to Palestinians.
- Israeli forces attacked the al-Birka area, south of Deir el-Balah, killing two people and injuring one.
- A Palestinian man was critically injured during clashes with Israeli forces in Beit Ummar.

=== 20 July ===
- The Gaza Health Ministry reported that at least 71 Palestinians were killed in Israeli attacks in the past 48 hours, bringing its count of the Palestinian death toll to 38,919.
- Wafa reported that Israeli forces hit a house belonging to the Ayyad family in Muraie Abu Al-Amin, Sheikh Radwan, killing five people.
- Israeli forces bombed a house belonging to the Abu Jasser family in Jabalia, killing four people including two children.
- Three people were killed after Israeli forces bombed a home belonging to the Al-Batran family in the Bureij refugee camp.
- In the Nuseirat camp, Israeli forces bombed a house belonging to the al-Sharihi family, killing four people and also bombed a house belonging to the Abu Sidra family in the vicinity of Murad Al-Talaa Mosque, killing eight people.
- An Israeli drone killed a Palestinian riding a bicycle in Khan Yunis.
- Israeli forces bombed a community collage in the Tal al-Hawa neighborhood, killing six people.
- Israeli forces bombed a house belonging to the al-Sabbagh family in the az-Zarqa area, north of Gaza City.
- The Al-Qassam and al-Quds Brigades claimed to have destroyed a Merkava-4 tank with an al-Yassin 105 rocket in Shaboura, Rafah refugee camp. They also claimed to have detonated a booby-trapped tunnel in Tal as-Sultan, killing an unspecified number of Israeli soldiers.
- Israeli forces bombed oil storage facilities and a power plant in the Yemeni port of Al Hudaydah in retaliation to the Tel Aviv drone strike.
- Israeli forces bombed Aadloun in southern Lebanon, injuring an unspecified number of civilians.
- Three people including a child were killed after Israeli forces bombed a house belonging to the Khalifa family.
- Two Israeli soldiers were injured after Hezbollah attacks in the occupied Golan heights.
- The Al-Qassam Brigades placed a sticky bomb on an IDF vehicle and detonated it in the West Bank.
- The Al-Quds Brigades fired missiles at an IDF site in Nahal Oz.

=== 21 July ===
- The Gaza Health Ministry reported that at least 64 Palestinians were killed in Israeli attacks in the past 24 hours, bringing its count of the Palestinian death toll to 38,983.
- The IDF reported killing approximately 20 Hamas operatives from the Al-Shati Battalion, including a member who killed Sergeant First Class Tal Lahat, and Hamas operative Nemer Hamida.
- Anti-government protests broke out in Tel Aviv and West Jerusalem, calling for the release of hostages.
- Israeli National Security Minister Itamar Ben-Gvir threatened to "dismantle" the Palestinian Authority if the US imposed sanctions on other far-right Israeli ministers including himself.
- Israeli forces raided Tubas, clashing with the Al-Qassam Brigades and the Al-Quds Brigades' Tubas Battalion. Israeli forces also raided the village of Al-Mazra'a ash-Sharqiya, near Ramallah.
- The Houthis claimed an attack on the Liberia-flagged cargo vessel Pumba with missiles in the Red Sea.
- Two Lebanese soldiers were injured after Israeli forces shelled an army position on the outskirts of Alma ash-Shaab.
- In the village of Qusra, south of Nablus, two foreign activists and a Palestinian were assaulted by settlers from Esh Kodesh.
- Three people were killed after Israeli forces bombed an apartment building in Gaza City's Tuffah neighborhood.
- Israeli settlers burned down olive groves belonging to Palestinians in Madama, south of Nablus.

=== 22 July ===
- The Gaza Health Ministry reported that at least 23 Palestinians were killed in Israeli attacks in the past 24 hours, bringing its count of the Palestinian death toll to 39,006.
- Israeli forces bombed the eastern parts of Khan Yunis, killing at least 81 people and injuring over 250, 30 people remained missing under the rubble.
- Israel confirmed the death of two hostages held in Gaza by Hamas. They are Yagev Buchshtab, a sound technician, and Alex Dancyg, a historian.
- A Canadian national was shot and killed after allegedly attempting to conduct a stabbing attack in Netiv HaAsara.
- Israel ordered evacuations from eastern neighborhoods of Khan Yunis.
- Hezbollah claimed an attack on an IDF site in Malkia.
- Hamas claimed an attack on an IDF "command headquarters" in the Netzarim Corridor.
- Israeli authorities demolished a Palestinian home in 'Anata, northeast of the Old City in occupied East Jerusalem.
- The IDF announced the death of a soldier in a grenade explosion in the Gaza Strip.
- Hezbollah attacked the Israeli town of Tzuriel, injuring two people.
- Israeli settlers stormed Islamic shrines with police protection in Kifl Haris, north of Salfit.
- Israeli forces clashed with local Palestinian fighters during a raid in Tulkarm, injuring a Palestinian man. An improvised explosive was set off targeting the IDF.
- Israeli forces struck a media tent outside of the Al-Aqsa Martyrs' hospital, killing one journalist.

=== 23 July ===
- The Gaza Health Ministry reported that at least 84 Palestinians were killed in Israeli attacks in the past 24 hours, bringing its count of the Palestinian death toll to 39,090.
- The IDF reported Hamas rockets endangering Israeli and Gazan civilians alike, with one Hamas rocket falling inside Gaza and hitting a school in Nuseirat.
- Five Palestinians were killed in an Israeli drone strike in Tulkarm, including the leader of Hamas in Tulkarm and the head of the al-Aqsa Martyrs’ Brigades in Tulkarm.
- Israeli forces bombed 2 houses in Gaza City: in Sabra, killing eight people including two children; and in al-Sahaba, killing four people.
- Israeli forces attacked a house in the al-Alami area of the Jabalia refugee camp, killing four people.
- Israeli forces shot and killed two Palestinian men in Sa'ir and ash-Shuyukh, Hebron Governorate.
- Israeli forces arrested a Palestinian man in Izbat Shufa, south of Tulkarm, and arrested a 15-year-old in al-Amud neighbourhood in Silwan, occupied East Jerusalem.
- The Al-Qassam Brigades targeted an Israeli bulldozer with explosives in the al-Ghanim neighbourhood of Tulkarm Refugee Camp.
- Japan imposed sanctions on four Israeli settlers in the West Bank for the first time.
- Israeli authorities forced a Palestinian man to demolish his two-story house in the village of at-Tur in occupied East Jerusalem.
- Nine people including four children were killed by an Israeli attack on a house in Bureij.
- Israeli settlers set olive groves on fire in Burin, south of Nablus.
- The Al-Qassam Brigades claimed an ambush on the IDF near the separation fence adjacent to the village of al-Mutilla by detonating an explosive device to lure soldiers before launching a surprise attack and wounding three of them.
- Israeli settlers stormed the village of Huwara, south of Nablus, injuring two Palestinians.

=== 24 July ===
- The Gaza Health Ministry reported that at least 55 Palestinians were killed in Israeli attacks in the past 24 hours, bringing its count of the Palestinian death toll to 39,145.
- Israeli forces shot and killed a Palestinian customs officer in Tubas.
- A Palestinian man was shot and another one was run over after Israeli soldiers stormed the Qalandiya refugee camp and bulldozed a home.
- A 16-year-old was injured by Israeli forces in Beit Dajan, east of Nablus.
- The Al-Qassam Brigades and Al-Quds Brigades claimed to have destroyed an Israeli armoured personnel carrier in the centre of Bani Suheila, east of Khan Yunis.
- The IDF recovered the bodies of five hostages during an operation in Khan Yunis.

=== 25 July ===
- The Gaza Health Ministry reported that at least 30 Palestinians were killed in Israeli attacks in the past 24 hours, bringing its count of the Palestinian death toll to 39,175.
- A 23-year-old Syrian man died after being shot by Israeli forces in the Golan heights near Ruwayhinah village the evening prior.
- The Al-Qassam Brigades claimed to have killed Israeli soldiers after luring them into two tunnels in Rafah's Yabna refugee camp. It also claimed to have shelled Israeli positions with mortars near the az-Zelaal Mosque in eastern Khan Yunis with the Al-Quds Brigades.
- Israel announced that a soldier of the 401st Brigade was killed by being exposed to 'toxic fumes' in the southern Gaza Strip. Another soldier was killed after Hamas militants attacked an Israeli D9 bulldozer in Rafah, bringing the IDF death toll in the Gaza Strip to 330.
- Hamas attempted to fire several rockets into Israeli territory from the humanitarian zone in Khan Yunis, but these failed and fell near an UNRWA-run school, injuring several people and killing two. The IDF transferred the injured civilians to a field hospital in Deir al Balah.

=== 26 July ===
- Khadija School airstrike
- A new group called the Al Thawriyyun group claimed responsibility for attacks on the Ain al Asad Airbase in Iraq and the Conoco Mission Support Site in Syria.
- The IDF destroyed a Palestinian attack tunnel, 1 km long, that contained weapons, missiles, means for prolonged stay, and exit points in residential areas.

=== 27 July ===
- The Gaza Health Ministry reported that at least 83 Palestinians were killed in Israeli attacks in the past 48 hours, bringing its count of the Palestinian death toll to 39,258.
- Israeli forces bombed a house in northern Rafah, killing two people.
- At least one Palestinian was killed after Israeli forces bombed the Ard al-Mufti area, north of the Nuseirat refugee camp.
- Israeli forces stormed the village of al-Mazraa al-Gharbiya, northwest of Ramallah, shooting and injuring two Palestinian children.
- Israeli forces used 3 missiles to taget Hamas militants and large quantities of weapons in the Khadija School in Deir el-Balah, killing at least 30 people and injuring over 100.
- Israeli forces raided a house in Abasan al-Kabira, killing at least 15 people.
- Israel forces bombed displaced Palestinians' tents in the Old Cemetery area in central Khan Yunis, killing one person.
- Israeli forces bombed a motorcycle in Bani Suheila, killing two people including a child.
- Two Palestinian males, including a 17-year-old boy, were killed by an Israeli drone strike in the Balata Camp, West Bank.
- The al-Quds Brigades claimed to have captured an Israeli Evo Max drone while it was carrying out intelligence missions in eastern Khan Yunis.
- Two Hezbollah fighters were killed in an Israeli airstrike on Kafr Kila, Lebanon.
- At least 12 people were killed and 42 others were wounded by an alleged Hezbollah rocket attack on the Druze town of Majdal Shams in the occupied Golan Heights. Hezbollah denied responsibility for the attack.
- Israel ordered another evacuation of Khan Yunis, including some areas of Mawasi previously designated by Israeli forces as a "humanitarian zone".
- Al Jazeera citing testimony from the family reported that Israeli soldiers stormed a house in the Shujayea neighbourhood of Gaza City, injuring multiple members of the family, including an elderly woman who was critically wounded. Then, Israeli soldiers ran over her using a tank.

=== 28 July ===
- The Gaza Health Ministry reported that at least 66 Palestinians were killed in Israeli attacks in the past 24 hours, bringing its count of the Palestinian death toll to 39,324.
- A soldier of the Givati Brigade's Shaked Battalion died of wounds sustained in Rafah a week prior, bringing the IDF death toll to 331.
- Israeli forces shot a 17-year-old Palestinian in the Balata refugee camp and also shot at ambulance crews that tried to help him.
- Israeli forces attacked areas in Lebanon including Khiam, Tyre, Abbasiya, Burj el-Shemali, Taraiyya and a field between the towns of Shmustar and Taraiyya in the Bekaa Valley. There were no reported casualties.
- 219 trucks carrying humanitarian aid passed from Israel to Gaza.
- Israel paused operations in the Bani Suheila neighborhood to allow the delivery of humanitarian aid.

=== 29 July ===
- The Gaza Health Ministry reported that at least 39 Palestinians were killed in Israeli attacks in the past 24 hours, bringing its count of the Palestinian death toll to 39,363.
- Israeli settlers attacked the village of Qalqas, south of Hebron, and burned cars belonging to Palestinians.
- Two Hezbollah fighters were killed after an Israeli airstrike destroyed a motorbike near Meiss Ej Jabal.
- Israeli forces demolished a Palestinian home in Ein ad-Duyuk at-Tahta, near Jericho.
- Nine Israeli soldiers were accused of abusing a Palestinian detainee in the Sde Teiman detention camp in southern Israel, prompting an investigation by the IDF. Some Israelis protested against the arrest of the nine soldiers.
- Hezbollah claimed an attack on the "al-Baghdadi site" in northern Israel.
- Israeli forces bombed an apartment belonging to the Helles family near al-Wahda Tower in western Gaza City, killing three people including a woman.

=== 30 July ===
- The Gaza Health Ministry reported that at least 37 Palestinians were killed in Israeli attacks in the past 24 hours, bringing its count of the Palestinian death toll to 39,400.
- Israeli forces demolished houses in Beit Awwa, southwest of Hebron and Duma, southeast of Nablus.
- Israeli forces withdrew from Khan Yunis, ending the second battle for the city.
- At least 12 Palestinians were killed by an Israeli attack on the entrance of the Nuseirat refugee camp.
- Hezbollah attacked the "al-Sahl Battalion" in the Israeli community of Beit Hillel in response to an Israeli attack on Jebchit and Bayt Lif in southern Lebanon.
- One person was killed after a rocket attack on HaGoshrim in northern Israel.
- Nine Palestinians were killed by Israeli bombing whilst retrieving dead bodies from the Bureij camp.
- Israeli forces shot a man during a raid into the al-Ein refugee camp, west of Nablus. Israeli forces also shot a man close range at a junction near Beit Einun, north of Hebron, and blocked medical teams from reaching him, resulting in his death.
- Israel said it had carried out a strike in the suburbs of Beirut, targeting Fuad Shukr, the Hezbollah commander it accused of responsibility for the Majdal Shams attack. The strike killed Shukr, an Iranian advisor and five civilians and injured 74 according to the Lebanese Health Ministry.
- The Gaza Health Ministry declared a polio epidemic across the Gaza Strip.
- The US bombed a base south of Baghdad used by the Popular Mobilization Forces, killing four and injuring three.
- 213 trucks with humanitarian goods passed from Israel to Gaza.
- To allow humanitarian aid to be delivered Israel paused operations in the Al- Nasr neighborhood.

=== 31 July ===
- The Gaza Health Ministry reported that at least 45 Palestinians were killed in Israeli attacks in the past 24 hours, bringing its count of the Palestinian death toll to 39,445.
- One person was killed and four were injured after Israeli forces bombed Abasan al-Kabira.
- Hamas political leader Ismail Haniyeh was assassinated alongside one of his guards in Tehran, where he had travelled to from his residence in Qatar to attend the inauguration ceremony of the new Iranian President Masoud Pezeshkian.
- Al Jazeera Arabic journalists Ismail al-Ghoul and Rami al-Rifi were killed in an Israeli airstrike in the Al-Shati camp. The IDF reported that al-Ghoul was listed on Hamas' document from 2021 as an engineer at the Gaza brigade, and that he took part in the October 7 attacks and instructed others to document their attacks. The reports were denied by Al Jazeera, saying he was released in March after being detained for few hours, when allegedly no involvement in terrorist activities was found.
- Hamas claimed responsibility for a shooting that seriously wounded an Israeli settler near Beit Einun, northeast of Hebron.
- Israeli settlers attacked a Palestinian man in Qusra, south of Nablus.
- 173 trucks with humanitarian goods passed from Israel to Gaza. Israel paused operations in the Al Samach neighborhood to allow humanitarian aid to be delivered.

== August 2024 ==
=== 1 August ===
- The Gaza Health Ministry reported that at least 35 Palestinians were killed in Israeli attacks in the past 24 hours, bringing its count of the Palestinian death toll to 39,480.
- The IAF hit a house in the Nuseirat camp, killing at least three people.
- Israeli forces shelling hit a vehicle at the entrance to the Maghazi refugee camp, killing at least eight people.
- Israeli authorities released 15 Palestinian prisoners who were sent to the Al-Aqsa Martyrs Hospital in Deir al-Balah for their injuries during captivity.
- Israeli forces arrested four Palestinians after Israeli settlers seized their farmland in Hizma, occupied East Jerusalem.
- The IDF said that Mohammed Deif, the leader of the military wing of Hamas, was killed in an airstrike in al-Mawasi on 13 July.
- Israeli forces hit a school in eastern Shuja'iyya, killing at least 15 people. The IDF reported the strike was on a group of Hamas operatives hiding in the school with “many steps” taken including aerial surveillance and precision munitions to minimize danger for nearby civilians.
- Israel seized a further 790 hectares (1,950 acres) of land near the town of Salfit in the West Bank.
- Five Syrian civilians were killed and five Lebanese civilians injured in an Israeli airstrike in the vicinity of A-Nauka and Majdelyoun in southern Lebanon.
- A campaign that threatened the Israeli delegation at the Olympics and offered rewards for their murder, abduction, injury and theft, was removed from the internet by Israel's Cyber Directorate and Internet Association.
- A Palestinian man was shot by Israeli forces while on his motorcycle in southern Hebron.
- To allow humanitarian aid to be delivered Israel paused operations in the Tal a-Zahour neighborhood.

=== 2 August ===
- The IAF struck an apartment building in Gaza City's al-Jalaa Street, killing four people and injuring 12 others.
- Israeli forces struck a house in the Zeitoun neighborhood, killing a child and injuring four more.
- Israeli forces struck a house near the Abu Hamid Roundabout in Khan Yunis, killing four people.
- Two homes were caught on fire from stun grenades and tear gas during an Israeli raid in Umm Safa, north of Ramallah.
- Israeli bulldozers and settlers razed farmlands belonging to Palestinian families in Tulkarm.
- Three people were killed after Israeli forces strike near the Jordanian hospital in Tel al-Hawa.
- A PRCS volunteer was killed after being shot by Israeli forces during a raid on the Balata Camp.
- Former Grand Mufti of Jerusalem Sheikh Ekrima Sa'id Sabri was arrested for calling Ismail Haniyeh a "martyr".
- Palestinian militants fired rockets near Kiryat Malakhi, Nahal Oz and Sufa from the Gaza strip.

=== 3 August ===
- The Gaza Health Ministry reported that at least 70 Palestinians were killed in Israeli attacks in the past 48 hours, bringing its count of the Palestinian death toll to 39,550.
- At least nine Palestinians were killed in two Israeli drone strikes targeting cars in Zeita and Bal'a in Tulkarm.
- A Palestinian was shot in the abdomen by Israeli forces during a raid in Abwein, northwest of Ramallah.
- Sweden closed its embassy in Lebanon and evacuated its staff.
- Over 30 people including children and two journalists were arrested during Israeli raids across the West Bank.
- The family of Eitan Levy approved the republication of the video in which he was lynched and his dead body was abused by several Gazans on October, saying that the video "proves the civilians of Gaza are not innocent".
- A Hezbollah fighter was killed in an Israeli airstrike on a vehicle in Tyre, Lebanon.
- Five people including three women and a child were killed during an Israeli attack on Khan Yunis.
- Iranian authorities arrested multiple people including members of military and intelligence units, in connection with the assassination of Ismail Haniyeh.
- One person was killed after an Israeli drone struck a car at the Syrian side of the border with Lebanon.
- Hezbollah attacked the village of Avivim in northern Israel in response to the Israeli attacks on southern Lebanon.
- Israeli forces bombed the Hamama School that was sheltering displaced people in Sheikh Radwan twice, killing over 17 people and injuring over 60.
- A 17-year-old boy was killed and six others were injured in an Israeli airstrike on Deir Siriane in southern Lebanon's Marjeyoun District.
- Israeli settlers attacked the village of al-Mughayyir and burned farmers' tents and injured six people. Israeli settlers also attacked the town of Surif, north of Hebron, and burned over 40 olive trees.
- The Al Aqsa Martyrs' Brigades and the Ansar Brigades fired rockets targeting Nahal Oz.
- A Houthi missile struck the Liberian-flagged container ship Groton in the Gulf of Aden without causing casualties.

=== 4 August ===
- The Gaza Health Ministry reported that at least 33 Palestinians were killed in Israeli attacks in the past 24 hours, bringing its count of the Palestinian death toll to 39,583.
- Two Israeli civilians were killed and two more were injured by a stabbing attack in Holon. The attacker, a 35 year old Palestinian man from Salfit who crossed into Israel three days prior to the attack, was killed by an Israeli police officer who happened to be at the scene.
- A soldier from the IDF's 401st Armoured Brigade's 9th Battalion was critically injured while fighting in Rafah.
- Four Palestinians were killed after Israeli forces bombed a house belonging to the Amour family in the al-Fakhoura area of Jabalia.
- The IDF struck two schools in Gaza City's Sheikh Radwan neighborhood, Hassan Salama and Nasr, which according to the IDF, housed Hamas command and control rooms. The following day, the IDF said that one of the casualties in the attack was Jaber Aziz, commander of Hamas's Sheikh Radwan Battalion.
- A Palestinian man was assaulted by Israeli settlers somewhere in occupied East Jerusalem and was later arrested by the Israeli police. Israeli forces also made arrests in Qalqilya, the Shu'fat Camp, northeast of East Jerusalem and Silwan.
- Israeli forces bombed a house belonging to the al-Hasanat family in Deir el-Balah, killing three people.
- Israeli forces bombed tents housing displaced people at the Al-Aqsa Martyrs Hospital, killing at least three people and wounded 18 others.
- The IAF said it have killed a Hamas fighter in the Nazareth area.
- Israeli forces attempted to target a motorcycle with a drone in the Lebanese town of Rab El Thalathine but missed, causing no injury.
- Hezbollah claimed an attack on Birkat Risha and Manara in northern Israel.
- The Houthis claimed to have shot down a US MQ-9 Reaper drone over Sanaa.

=== 5 August ===
- The Gaza Health Ministry reported that at least 40 Palestinians were killed in Israeli attacks in the past 24 hours, bringing its count of the Palestinian death toll to 39,623.
- Two Israeli soldiers were moderately injured by shrapnel from a drone strike in Ayelet HaShahar.
- Two people were killed in the Lebanese village of Meiss Ej Jabal in Marjeyoun district by the IDF, who reported they were Hezbollah operatives that were spotted operating a drone.
- Five Palestinians were arrested by Israeli forces in the village of Husan, west of Bethlehem.
- A Palestinian woman died from injuries suffered during her arrest in Jenin by Israeli forces on May 21. She had been treated at a hospital in Afula and released on June 3.
- Israeli forces demolished two Palestinian homes in the village of al-Jalameh, northeast of Jenin.
- Bezalel Smotrich, the far-right Israeli Finance Minister, stated that he believes that blocking humanitarian aid to the Gaza Strip is "justified and moral" even if it causes two million Gazans to die of starvation, and expressed frustration that the international community would not allow that to happen.
- Seven Israeli soldiers were injured in the Gaza Strip, four of them seriously, after a Hamas operative hurled an explosive device at them.
- Palestinian militants in Khan Yunis fired 15 rockets into Israel, with one hitting and lightly injuring a truck driver near Re'im.
- Five Palestinian police officers were killed in an Israeli airstrike on their vehicle in Gaza City.
- Israel returned the bodies of 84 Palestinians to the Gaza Strip. The bodies will be buried in a mass grave after an examination to try to identify the bodies and determine cause of death. The Hostages and Missing Families Forum criticized the return because no bodies of Israeli hostages were received in exchange.
- Israeli forces raided the town of 'Aqqaba near Jenin, killing two people and injuring seven more.
- Five US personnel were injured in a suspected rocket attack on the Ain al-Asad Airbase in Iraq.
- A Palestinian woman from Jabalia was caught with a fake Israeli ID after she infiltrated into Israel.
- The United Nations completed its investigation over allegations by Israel that some UNRWA employees took part in the October 7 attack on Israel. Of the 19 staffers investigated, one was exonerated, nine were found guilty and terminated, and the evidence against the rest was found to be insufficient.
- The Washington post reported that the U.S. military has hit a drone production facility in Iraq, killing Houthi drone expert and four pro-Iranian militia operatives that planned an attack on U.S. forces.

=== 6 August ===
- The Gaza Health Ministry reported that at least 30 Palestinians were killed in Israeli attacks in the past 24 hours, bringing its count of the Palestinian death toll to 39,653.
- Israel announced that the remains of the last missing person from the October 7 attacks had been found.
- Hezbollah claimed an attack on a building used by Israeli forces in Avivim.
- Israeli forces arrested two young Palestinians in the Jalazone refugee camp, north of Ramallah; three Palestinians in Artas, Bethlehem and one Palestinian in Kafr Dan, west of Jenin.
- Four people were killed in an Israeli airstrike on the village of Mayfadoun in southern Lebanon.
- Five Palestinians were killed in two Israeli airstrikes in Jenin. The IDF reported the first strike hit gunmen shooting at troops, and the second targeted another cell that fired at forces.
- Four Palestinians were killed in an Israeli raid on Aqqaba.
- Three Palestinians were killed by Israeli forces during a raid on the village of Kafr Qud, west of Jenin.
- Hezbollah launched "swarms of drones" into northern Israel, targeting the headquarters of the IDF's Golani Brigade, an infantry brigade, and the headquarters of the Egoz Unit. Five Israeli civilians were injured in the attack.
- Pakistan announced that it would supply Iran with missiles if a regional conflict broke out with Israel. Days later the report was denied by the Pakistani foreign ministry.
- Israeli settlers attacked cars with Palestinian passengers near Marah Rabah.
- Israeli forces shot and injured a Palestinian man in Tammun, south of Tubas after he allegedly "carried out a shooting attack" in the illegal settlement of Beka'ot. Israeli forces blocked the PRCS from giving him medical treatment.
- The Al Thawriyyun Group claimed an attack on US forces in the Ain Al Asad air base in Iraq.
- The Federation of Jewish Communities in the Czech Republic reported that from October 7 until the end of 2023, there were 1,800 antisemitic incidents in the country, which represent a 254% monthly increase compared to 2022.
- At least three people were killed and 10 were wounded in an Israeli airstrike in an area housing displaced Palestinians designated as a "safe zone" by Israeli forces in Deir al- Balah.

=== 7 August ===
- The Gaza Health Ministry reported that at least 24 Palestinians were killed in Israeli attacks in the past 24 hours, bringing its count of the Palestinian death toll to 39,677.
- Israeli forces bombed an apartment building in the Tuffah neighborhood, killing at least three people.
- Israeli forces shot and killed two people during a raid in Beit Furik, east of Nablus and killed a Palestinian in Atuf plain, south of Tubas.
- Israeli forces shelled Khuza'a, east of Khan Yunis, killing a Palestinian woman and injuring others.
- Two sonic booms were detected near Beirut caused by Israeli warplanes.
- Two people were killed in an Israeli airstrike on a motorcycle near Jwaya in southern Lebanon.
- Hezbollah claimed an attack on the IDF near Jall el Aalam.
- A Palestinian World Central Kitchen employee was killed in Deir al-Balah.
- A 14-year old Palestinian was assaulted and detained by Israeli forces while another one was also injured during a raid in Hebron's Jabal Abu Rumman neighbourhood.

=== 8 August ===
- The Gaza Health Ministry reported that at least 22 Palestinians were killed in Israeli attacks in the past 24 hours, bringing its count of the Palestinian death toll to 39,699.
- Israeli forces bombed a house in the Bureij refugee camp, killing at least 10 people.
- Rockets from Lebanon hit the Israeli communities of Shlomi and al-Kabri while rockets from Israel hit the Lebanese villages of Rashaf, Hadada, and At Tiri.
- Israeli forces bombed the al-Zahraa School and the Abdel Fattah Hamoud School in eastern Gaza City, killing 12 Palestinians.
- Israeli forces bombed a house in the Nuseirat camp, killing four people.
- Hamas destroyed an Israeli armoured vehicle in the Tell al-sultan neighborhood and launched rockets towards Ashdod and Gan Yavne.
- To allow humanitarian aid to be delivered Israel paused operations in the Al- Tzachabah neighborhood.

=== 9 August ===
- Israeli forces re-invaded Khan Yunis for the third time since the start of the war.
- Two people were killed by an Israeli airstrike on the town of Naqoura in southern Lebanon.
- Israeli forces bombed an area where displaced people were sheltering in Al-Mawasi, Rafah, killing at least five people including two children.
- Hamas official Samer al-Hajj and another Hamas member were killed in an Israeli drone strike near Sidon, Lebanon.
- An Israeli officer from the Nahal Brigade's reconnaissance unit was seriously injured while fighting in the southern Gaza strip.
- A Palestinian man was killed in a quadcopter attack in al-Qarara, near Khan Yunis.
- Hezbollah claimed an attack on Israeli troops stationed at the Dovev Barracks.
- Israeli forces bombed a house in the western Nuseirat camp, killing four people.
- At least five people including two children were killed and injuries were reported in an Israeli airstrike in al-Mawasi humanitarian area.

=== 10 August ===
- The Gaza Health Ministry reported that at least 91 Palestinians were killed in Israeli attacks in the past 72 hours, bringing its count of the Palestinian death toll to 39,790.
- Over 90 Palestinians were killed when an Israeli strike hit the al-Tabin school in Gaza City. The IDF said that the facility was used by Hamas as a command center, with weapons and tunnel shafts in most of the buildings. The IDF named 19 militants who were killed in the attack, and stated that the use of three precise munitions could not have created the level of damage reported by Hamas.
- Al Jazeera reported that Israeli forces struck targets in the Lebanese village of Majdel Selm twice, injuring two people and also struck targets in Hula and Tayr Harfa.
- Al Jazeera reported that Israeli drone strike hit a home and killed one person in the Baraka area, south of Deir el-Balah.
- Al Jazeera reported that Israeli forces strike hit a mosque in the Nuseirat camp, killing at least three people.
- Al Jazeera reported that at least seven people were killed after Israeli forces strike hit the Mann area, east of Khan Yunis.
- Al Jazeera reported that Israeli forces strike hit and destroyed a residential building in the Nuseirat camp, killing at least ten people.
- Hezbollah launched explosive bombs at northern Israel.
- Al Jazeera reported that Israeli forces shot four Palestinians including two children in Beit Furik, east of Nablus and one Palestinian in Rummanah, west of Jenin.

=== 11 August ===
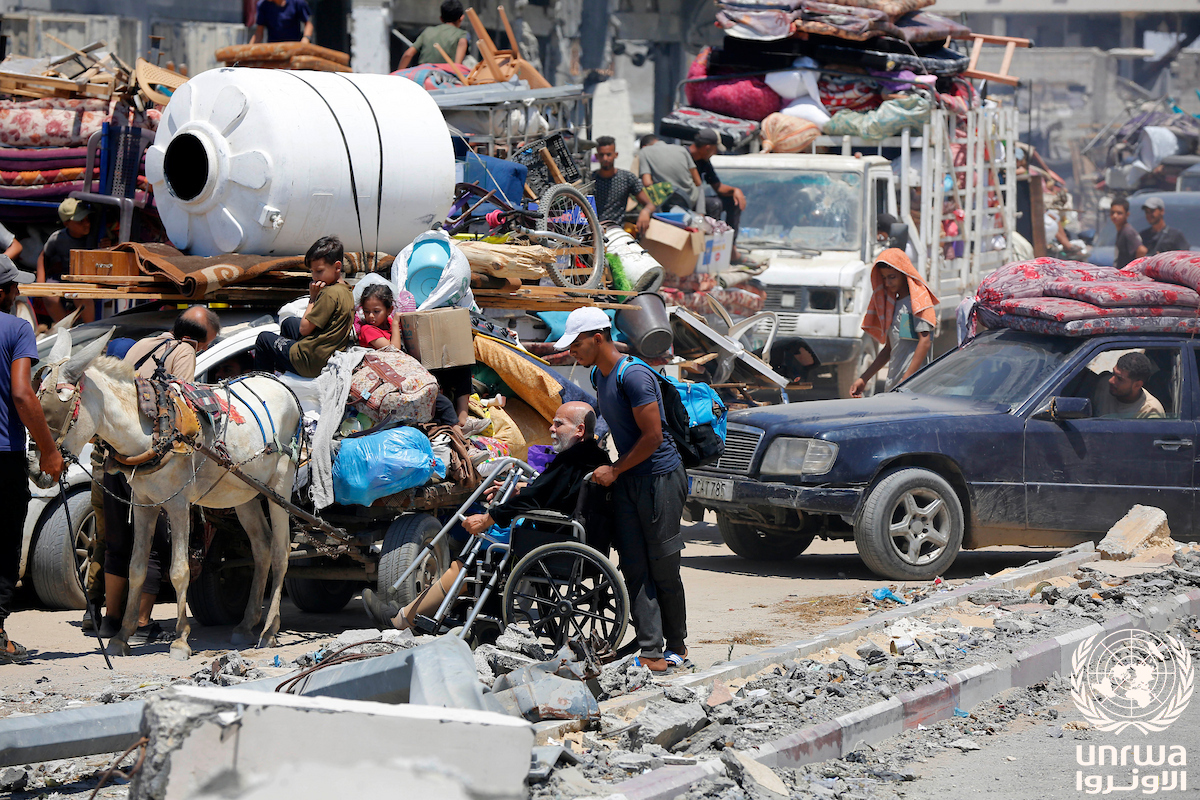
People evacuating from Hamad City in Khan Younis

- A 23-year old Jewish Israeli settler was killed and a 32-year old Israeli man was moderately wounded in a drive-by shooting attack on Route 90 near the Mehola junction. The two victims were driving two separate vehicles. The attacker(s) escaped with authorities conducting a manhunt for the perpetrator(s). Hamas later took responsibility for the attack.
- Israel ordered the evacuation of Khan Younis
- Two people were killed in an Israeli airstrike in Taybeh, southern Lebanon.
- Israel reported that three million pita loaves were being produced daily in seven bakeries in the Gaza Strip and 4629 aid trucks carrying food entered Gaza in July, while military operations were to be paused in the Fadaous neighborhood in Deir Al Balah between 10:00 and 14:00 to allow delivery of humanitarian aid.
- Israel announced a soldier of the Paratroopers Brigade's 101st Battalion was killed by a Hamas sniper in southern Gaza, bringing the IDF death toll in the Gaza Strip to 332.
- 194 trucks with humanitarian goods passed from Israel to Gaza.
- To allow humanitarian aid to be delivered Israel paused operations in the Fadaous neighborhood.

=== 12 August ===
- The Gaza Health Ministry reported that at least 107 Palestinians were killed in Israeli attacks in the past 48 hours, increasing its count of the death toll to 39,897.
- Israeli forces shot and detained a Palestinian man in Ramallah's at-Tira neighbourhood.
- An Israeli interceptor missile accidentally landed on top of a house in the moshav of Avdon, causing damage.
- Israeli forces clashed with Palestinians during a raid in Jenin's al-Marah neighborhood and a commercial store in the city's old town. Israeli forces also raided other places in the West Bank including Hebron, Beit Ummar, Tell, Talluza, Aqabat Jaber, Kafr Qaddum Hajjah and Rafat, resulting in the arrests of over 12 people.
- Three Palestinians including a paramedic were killed during Israeli shelling on Bani Suheila, east of Khan Yunis.
- Israeli settlers set up tents in Khirbet Umm al-Jimal in the northern Jordan Valley.
- Three people were killed after the IAF bombed a group of civilians in the vicinity of the Bader Mosque in the Zeitoun neighbourhood.
- Hamas spokesman Abu Obaida announced that Hamas members assigned to guard Israeli hostages had killed one male hostage and seriously injured two female hostages. After a 3-day investigation by Hamas, Abu Obaida stated that the guard that killed the hostage "acted in a vengeful manner, contrary to instructions" after receiving news that two of his children were killed by Israeli forces.
- An 18-year-old Hamas operative shot and seriously wounded an Israeli man and injured two Palestinian bystanders in Qalqilya. The Hamas operative, who was released from an Israeli prison in November 2023 during the Israel-Hamas prisoner swap, was subsequently shot dead by Israeli forces as he attempted to flee.
- At least 10 Palestinians were killed in an Israeli airstrike that destroyed a house in Abasan al-Kabira, southern Gaza.

=== 13 August ===
- The Gaza Health Ministry reported that at least 32 Palestinians were killed in Israeli attacks in the past 24 hours, increasing its count of the death toll to 39,929.
- Al Jazeera reported that a young Palestinian man was shot and killed by Israeli forces during a pre-dawn operation in Al-Am'ari in the West Bank.
- Hamas fired two rockets towards Tel Aviv, with one impacting the coast of the city and the other crashing inside Gaza.
- Al Jazeera reported that two Hezbollah fighters were killed in an Israeli airstrike on a car in Baraachit in southern Lebanon.
- Israeli forces temporarily closed a Hamas humanitarian aid road after an alleged Hamas attack.
- Al Jazeera reported that a 16-year-old Palestinian boy who was part of a crowd that was throwing Molotov cocktails over the barrier wall in the occupied East Jerusalem town of 'Anata was shot and killed by an Israeli sniper.
- Al Jazeera reported that Israeli settlers attacked Palestinian shepherds and activists who were accompanying them for safety in the village of Susya in Masafer Yatta, south of Hebron.
- 169 trucks with humanitarian goods passed from Israel to Gaza.

=== 14 August ===
- The Gaza Health Ministry reported that at least 36 Palestinians were killed in Israeli attacks in the past 24 hours, increasing its count of the Palestinian death toll in Gaza to 39,965.
- Al Jazeera reported that an Israeli drone struck the town of Tammun in the West Bank and killed four people, whose bodies were later seized by Israeli forces.
- Al Jazeera reported that Israeli forces demolished five structures belonging to Palestinians in Hebron.
- The Israeli government approved the creation of a new illegal settlement called Nahal Heletz in the illegal settlement cluster of Gush Etzion, Bethlehem, near Battir, a designated UNESCO World Heritage Site.
- Al Jazeera reported that five people including three children were killed after Israeli forces strike hit their home in As-Samin, Khan Yunis.
- The IDF shot a US citizen on the West Bank, later saying that it was "indirect and unintended", Reportedly the nearest Israeli soldier was 700 feet away.
- Al Jazeera reported that two members of the Palestinian Civil Defence were killed by Israeli forces in Rafah.
- An Israeli drone fell into the sea near Tel Aviv after suffering a "technical malfunction".
- Two people were killed and four were wounded in an Israeli drone strike that targeted a car in Marjayoun, southern Lebanon. Another person was killed by a drone strike in Blida, and there were no reports of casualties in a drone strike on Aabbassiyeh. The Israeli drone strikes came as retaliation for rockets fired by Hezbollah on Kiryat Shmona and the Western Gallilee earlier in the day. There were no reports of casualties as a result of the rockets fired by Hezbollah.
- The middle-east eye reported that an Israeli mob attacked Palestinian students in the town of Abu Snan.

=== 15 August ===
- The Gaza Health Ministry reported that at least 40 Palestinians were killed in the past 24 hours, increasing its count of the Palestinian death toll in Gaza to 40,005. The Ministry also reported that the real Palestinian death toll in Gaza is likely above 50,000 due to the thousands of missing people.
- The IDF said that at least 17,000 of the Palestinians killed since the start of the Israel-Hamas War were militants or members of Palestinian militant groups.
- Israeli forces assaulted and detained a Palestinian man in Masafer Yatta. Israeli settlers with the protection by the Israeli forces prevented Palestinian farmers from reaching their fields to harvest crops in Wadi Maain. Israeli settlers also set dozens of Olive trees on fire in Khalayel al-Loz, southeast of Bethlehem, where a group of settlers had raised Israeli flags over Palestinian lands in the area a few days earlier. In the Umm al-Jamal area in the northern Jordan Valley, Israeli settlers stole a flock of sheep belonging to a Palestinian farmer and took them to their own illegal outposts.
- More than 40 far-right young Israeli settlers attempted to break into Gaza through the Erez Crossing but were taken into question by Israeli security.
- An 11-year-old boy succumbed to 4th-degree burns sustained during the al-Tabin School bombing.
- A member of the IRGC's aerospace division was killed in an alleged Israeli airstrike in Syria.
- At least six Palestinians were killed after an Israeli airstrike hit a residential building in the Jabalia camp.
- At least one Palestinian was killed and eleven Palestinians were injured during an attack by over 70 masked Israeli settlers and soldiers in the villages of Jit in Qalqilya and in the town of Huwara in Nablus. The IDF called it as a "terrorist act".
- The Al-Quds Brigades, Al Aqsa Martyrs' Brigades and the Martyr Abdul Qader al Husseini Brigades fired rockets at IDF positions in the Netzarim Corridor.

=== 16 August ===
- One person was killed in an Israeli airstrike on Aitaroun in southern Lebanon.
- Four Palestinians, including three children, were killed in an Israeli airstrike on a tent camp in al-Mawasi.
- Hezbollah claimed an attack on an IDF site in Birkat Risha in northern Israel with "guided weapons", causing "confirmed casualties", as well as on IDF targets in Asi and Natu'a and the headquarters of the armoured brigades in Rawya barracks.
- Armed Israeli settlers assaulted Palestinian villagers and block their access to a spring in Khirbet Tana et-Tahta while another group of armed Israeli settlers attacked the al-Auja waterfalls area near Jericho and snatched 300 sheep at gunpoint.
- The Gaza health ministry reported its first confirmed polio case since 1999 in a 10-month old boy from Deir al-Balah.
- At least four Palestinians including three children were killed in an Israeli strike on a tent camp in al-Mawasi.
- Three people were killed during an Israeli raid in Tal al-Hawa, while several others were injured in a separate Israeli bombing of a home in the al-Farouq Square area in the Zeitoun neighborhood.
- The Mujahideen Brigades claimed an attack on an Israeli personnel carrier with a "Barrel bomb" IED in Rafah.

=== 17 August ===
- The Gaza Health Ministry reported that at least 69 Palestinians were killed in Israeli attacks in the past 48 hours, increasing its count of the Palestinian death toll in Gaza to 40,074.
- At least 18 members of one family were killed in an Israeli night attack on a warehouse used as a displaced persons camp in the Israeli-designated "safe-zone" in az-Zawayda. Israel reported it struck the place because rockets were fired from there toward Israel in recent weeks, and the place sheltered alleged "terrorist infrastructure”.
- At least ten people, including two children, were killed in an Israeli airstrike on Nabatieh in southern Lebanon. Israel reported that the strike targeted a Hezbollah weapons storage facility.
- An IAF drone struck and killed Hussein Ibrahim Kasseb, a commander in Hezbollah's Redwan Force. Hezbollah retaliated with 55 rockets launched at Israel. Two people where injured from the Hezbollah rockets.
- An Israeli quadcopter fatally shot a six-year-old boy in the head while he was sleeping in a tent in Hamad City, west of Khan Yunis.
- A joint airstrike by the IDF and Shin Bet on a vehicle in Jenin killed two Hamas members who were involved in the drive-by shooting attack on Route 90 on 11 August.
- Two soldiers of the Jerusalem Brigade's 8119th Battalion were killed by a Hamas roadside bomb at the Netzarim Corridor, bringing the IDF death toll in Gaza to 334.
- Israeli forces abducted a Palestinian man fluent in Hebrew in Khan Yunis and executed him using a quadcopter.

=== 18 August ===
- The Gaza Health Ministry reported that at least 25 Palestinians were killed in Israeli attacks in the past 24 hours, increasing its count of the Palestinian death toll in Gaza to 40,099.
- Israeli aircraft struck two apartments located in the Jabalia refugee camp, killing at least four Palestinians including children and women. A second airstrike on Jabalia injured at least seven children.
- An Israeli airstrike struck a home in Deir al-Balah, killing a man, a woman and their six children.
- An Israeli strike hit a home located in the Nuseirat refugee camp, killing seven Palestinians including three children. Another Israeli airstrike struck a house in the camp, killing five Palestinians and injuring 20 people including children.
- Israel forces opened fire near Hamad City, northwest of Khan Yunis, killing a woman and injuring more.
- A UNIFIL peacekeeper from Ghana was injured after Israeli forces bombed the Lebanese town of Ad-Dhahira located in southern Lebanon.
- An Israeli civilian security guard was killed after he was attacked by a Palestinian assailant armed with a hammer at the Bar-On industrial park near the Israeli settlement of Kedumim.

=== 19 August ===
- Hamas and the PIJ claimed responsibility for a suicide bombing on Lehi Road, in Tel Aviv that killed one person, the bomber (a middle aged man from Nablus), and moderately injured one civilian.
- In association with the Lehi Street bombing the Qassam Brigades announced a return to the strategy of suicide attacks in Israeli cities, which they had previously abandoned in 2006.
- The Gaza Health Ministry reported that at least 40 Palestinians were killed in Israeli attacks in the past 24 hours, increasing its count of the Palestinian death toll in Gaza to 40,139.
- Hezbollah claimed to repel Israeli soldiers that were trying to invade the Horsh Hadab Aina area in southern Lebanon.
- A Palestinian journalist was killed and another one was injured during an Israeli attack in Hamad City.
- An Israeli-Bedouin soldier of the 300th "Baram' Regional Brigade was killed in a Hezbollah rocket attack on Ya'ara, northern Israel.
- An Israeli fighter jet missile malfunctioned and struck a building housing Israeli troops in Khan Yunis, killing an officer of the Paratroopers Brigade's reconnaissance unit and wounding six others, and bringing the IDF death toll in the Gaza Strip to 335.
- The Palestinian Centre for Human Rights stated Israeli forces executed a Palestinian man in Khan Yunis.
- An Israeli strike on a house in Deir al-Balah killed a Palestinian woman and her six children. The IDF said that it targeted a significant PIJ operative.

=== 20 August ===
- The Gaza Health Ministry reported that at least 34 Palestinians were killed in Israeli attacks in the past 24 hours, increasing its count of the Palestinian death toll in Gaza to 40,173.
- The IDF announced the recovery of the bodies of six hostages in Khan Yunis who were abducted in the 7 October attacks.
- Israeli forces bombed a house belonging to the Zaid family in Bureij refugee camp in central Gaza, killing at least six people.
- Israeli forces bombed the Mustafa Hafez school in western Gaza, killing at least 12 people.
- Israeli forces bombed a market in Deir al-Balah, with witnesses stating the majority of casualties were children.
- Two people were killed in Israeli airstrikes on the village of Deira in southern Lebanon.
- At least nine Palestinians were killed in an Israeli drone strike on a market in Deir el-Balah.

=== 21 August ===
- The Gaza Health Ministry reported that at least 50 Palestinians were killed in Israeli attacks in the past 24 hours, increasing its count of the Palestinian death toll in Gaza to 40,223.
- Khalil Maqdah, a senior Fatah official and the brother of the head of the Lebanese branch of the Al-Aqsa Martyrs' Brigades, was killed by an Israeli airstrike in Sidon.
- 206 trucks with humanitarian goods passed from Israel to Gaza.
- To allow humanitarian aid to be delivered Israel paused operations in the Al Ghaban neighborhood.

=== 22 August ===
- The Gaza Health Ministry reported that at least 42 Palestinians were killed in Israeli attacks in the past 24 hours, increasing its count of the Palestinian death toll in Gaza to 40,265.
- Three Palestinians were killed in an Israeli drone strike on a house in Tulkarm.
- A soldier of the 401st Armoured Brigade's 46th Battalion was killed by an anti-tank missile in Rafah, bringing the IDF death toll in the Gaza Strip to 336.
- To allow humanitarian aid to be delivered Israel paused operations in the Al Shima neighborhood.

=== 23 August ===
- Seven people, including three Hezbollah fighters, were killed in several Israeli airstrikes on the Lebanese villages of Tayr Harfa, Ayta al-Jabal, Meiss Ej Jabal and Aitaroun.
- Three soldiers of the 16th Infantry Brigade (Jerusalem Brigade) was killed by a Hamas IED whilst searching a building in Gaza City. Another soldier was killed in clashes with Palestinian gunmen in an area within the Netzarim Corridor, bringing the IDF death toll in the Gaza Strip to 340.

=== 24 August ===
- The Gaza Health Ministry reported that at least 69 Palestinians were killed in Israeli attacks in the past 48 hours, increasing its count of the Palestinian death toll in Gaza to 40,334.
- At least 20 Palestinians were killed in several Israeli attacks in and around Khan Yunis, including 11 members of a single family.

=== 25 August ===
- The Gaza Health Ministry reported that at least 71 Palestinians were killed in Israeli attacks in the past 24 hours, increasing its count of the Palestinian death toll in Gaza to 40,405.
- Israel carried out preemptive strikes on Lebanon.
- Israel announced that a soldier of the Paratroopers Brigade was killed fighting in southern Gaza, bringing the IDF death toll in the Gaza Strip to 341.
- An Israeli Navy officer was killed by a malfunctioning missile launched by the Iron Dome on a Dvora-class fast patrol boat off the coast of Nahariya, northern Israel.
- A Palestinian man was killed and another was wounded after being shot by Israeli soldiers at an IDF checkpoint near the illegal Jewish settlement of Ariel, West Bank.
- A Hamas rocket targeting Tel Aviv struck an open area in Rishon LeZion.
- Israel said that it delivered 25,100 vaccine vials, enough to vaccinate 1.25 million people, to Gaza amid the polio outbreak.

=== 26 August ===
- The Gaza Health Ministry reported that at least 30 Palestinians were killed in Israeli attacks in the past 24 hours, increasing its count of the Palestinian death toll in Gaza to 40,435.
- An Israeli strike on the Al-Ezz Bin Abdul Salam School in Gaza City killed and wounded several people including women and children.
- A 47-year-old Palestinian man was killed after being shot by Israeli forces in Yatta in the West Bank.
- An Israeli drone strike in Nur Shams killed five people, including two children and a Hamas member released during the November 2023 prisoner exchange.
- A 40-year-old Palestinian man was killed by Jewish settlers during an attack on Wadi Rahal village in the West Bank.

=== 27 August ===
- The Gaza Health Ministry reported that at least 41 Palestinians were killed in Israeli attacks in the past 24 hours, increasing its count of the Palestinian death toll in Gaza to 40,476.
- The IDF said that it had rescued Qaid Farhan Al-Qadi, who had been held hostage by Hamas since October 7, in a "complex operation in the southern Gaza Strip".
- Israel announced that a soldier of the Nahal Brigade was killed fighting in southern Gaza, bringing the IDF death toll in the Gaza Strip to 341.
- A World Food Programme vehicle came under fire while it approached an IDF checkpoint at the Wadi Gaza Bridge in southern Gaza, causing no injuries. The organization halted its operations in Gaza the following day.
- 208 trucks with humanitarian goods passed from Israel to Gaza.
- To allow humanitarian aid to be delivered Israel paused operations in the Al Faruk neighborhood.

=== 28 August ===
- The Gaza Health Ministry reported that at least 58 Palestinians were killed in Israeli attacks in the past 24 hours, increasing its count of the Palestinian death toll in Gaza to 40,534.
- The IDF launched a military operation in the West Bank, killing at least 59 Palestinians and injuring at least 150 people.
- Israeli shelling on a school in Deir el-Balah killed eight Palestinians.
- A soldier of the Jerusalem Brigade was killed fighting Hamas in central Gaza, bringing the IDF death toll in the Gaza Strip to 342.
- Three PIJ and one Hezbollah militants were killed in an Israeli drone strike on a car on the Damascus-Beirut highway near Al-Zabadani junction in Rif Dimashq Governorate, southern Syria.
- The IDF recovered the body of a soldier killed during the 7 October attacks and held in Gaza since.
- The US imposed sanctions on an extremist Israeli settler and the organization Hashomer Yosh, which backs illegal Israeli outposts in the West Bank.
- Hamas senior official and former leader Khaled Mashal called for the resumption of suicide bombings on Israel.
- Reports claimed that Palestinian factions were considering a coup against Hamas leader Yahya Sinwar amid disagreements over the negotiations for a hostage release and ceasefire.

=== 29 August ===
- The Gaza Health Ministry reported that at least 68 Palestinians were killed in Israeli attacks in the past 24 hours, increasing its count of the Palestinian death toll in Gaza to 40,602.
- Israeli strikes in Nuseirat refugee camp and Deir el-Balah killed at least two girls and a woman.
- At least eight people including a child were killed in an Israeli bombing on al-Amal Hotel in Gaza City.
- The IDF said that it killed five Palestinian militants in a mosque in Tulkarm, including Mohammed Jaber, the commander of the PIJ-aligned Tulkarm Brigade.
- Flying shrapnel from an Israeli strike killed a girl in az-Zawayda and another girl in eastern Deir el-Balah.
- An Israeli strike struck a group of displaced people in Al-Amal neighbourhood of Khan Yunis, killing at least five Palestinians and wounding dozens including women and children.
- An IDF source claimed that Hamas' Rafah Brigade had ceased to function.
- Israel consented to a three-phase humanitarian pause aiming to allow around 640,000 Palestinian children to receive polio vaccines. Each phase would see a pause in fighting in Gaza for three days between 03:00 and 12:00.
- Nine members of one family including five infants and two women including a pregnant woman were killed in an Israeli airstrike struck on an apartment building in central Gaza.
- Four Palestinians were killed in an Israeli airstrike on the lead vehicle of an Anera aid convoy in southern Gaza. The IDF said that a vehicle in the front of the convoy was commandeered by armed men, while the humanitarian group which organized the convoy said that the dead were employees of the transportation company tasked with delivering the aid.
- An Israeli airstrike killed Muhammad Qatrawi, the commander of the PIJ's central Gaza brigade.
- The IDF said falsified polls with Hamas public support were shown in documents found in Gaza.

=== 30 August ===
- Israeli strikes in Abasan al-Kabira and Jabalia refugee camp killed at least five Palestinians including one child.
- The IDF said that its 98th division withdrew from Khan Yunis and Deir el-Balah after its month long operation, killing over 250 Palestinian militants and destroying dozens of militant sites. Palestinians said that civilians including women and children were also killed.
- Flying shrapnel from Israeli drone strikes in central Gaza killed two Palestinians including a child and injured eight others.
- Israeli soldiers killed Wissam Khazem, the leader of Hamas in Jenin, and two other militants during a shootout in the West Bank.
- Three Israeli soldiers were injured in two separate car bombings in the illegal settlement of Karmei Tzur and the Gush Etzion Junction. Both perpetrators were killed by security forces. Responsibility for the bombing was claimed by al-Aqsa Martyrs' Brigades and Hamas’ military wing. The bombs were assembled in Hebron, according to investigation.
- The US Navy vessel Cape Trinity started unloading 3,577 pallets of aid for Gaza at Israel's Ashdod port.

=== 31 August ===
- The Gaza Health Ministry reported that at least 89 Palestinians were killed in Israeli attacks in the past 48 hours, increasing its count of the Palestinian death toll in Gaza to 40,691.
- An Israeli strike on a home in Nuseirat refugee camp killed over 20 Palestinians.
- Two people were killed after an Israeli airstrike in Rafah.
- The Palestine Red Crescent Society said that Israeli forces fired at one of its ambulances in Jenin.
- An Israeli airstrike on a home near al-Ahli Arab Hospital killed at least three Palestinians and injured at least two children.
- The Gaza Health Ministry announced that Palestinian children began receiving polio vaccines for the first time.
- A squad commander of the Bislamach Brigade's 906th Battalion was killed and three others were injured during a shootout with two Hamas militants in Jenin. Both militants were also killed.
- The IDF recovered the bodies of six hostages taken during the 7 October attacks inside an underground tunnel in Rafah. Reports indicated that the hostages were killed shortly before their discovery. Among the hostages was Israeli-American Hersh Goldberg-Polin.
- Israeli forces attacked a house in the al-Tawbah area of the Jabalia refugee camp, killing at least two people.
- A Palestinian man died after experiencing alleged "systemic torture" while in an Israeli prison.

== September 2024 ==
=== 1 September ===
- The Gaza Health Ministry reported that at least 47 Palestinians were killed in Israeli attacks in the past 24 hours, increasing its count of the Palestinian death toll in Gaza to 40,738.
- Three Israeli police officers were shot dead by Palestinian gunmen of the Khalil al-Rahman Brigade during an ambush on their service car on Route 35 near the Idna-Tarqumiyah junction in the West Bank.
- Al Jazeera reported that an Israeli strike in Al-Mawasi, Rafah injured several people including children.
- Wafa reported that Israeli airstrikes hit two houses near Municipality Park in western Gaza City killed two Palestinians, including a girl, and injured six people.
- Gaza health officials said that an Israeli airstrike on the Safad School in Gaza City killed 11 people. The IDF said that it had targeted a Hamas command center.
- The Al-Aqsa Martyrs' Brigades in Jenin said that they were clashing with Israeli troops in the town of Al-Silah Al-Harithiya and had injured some Israelis.
- 208 trucks with humanitarian goods passed from Israel to Gaza.
- To allow humanitarian aid to be delivered, Israel paused operations in the Al-Rashid neighborhood in Gaza.

=== 2 September ===
- The Gaza Health Ministry reported that at least 48 Palestinians were killed in Israeli attacks in the past 24 hours, increasing its count of the Palestinian death toll in Gaza to 40,786.
- The Israeli government appointed Barak Hiram as the general of the Gaza Division after his predecessor, Avi Rosenfeld, resigned.
- Israel's largest trade union, the Histadrut, staged a general strike across Israel calling for a ceasefire agreement to release the hostages held by Hamas in Gaza. The strike ended after a few hours after a labor court judge ordered its end due to the "political nature" of the strike.
- An Israeli strike in the vicinity of Nuseirat refugee camp killed at least two people including one child.
- The UK halted 30 arms export licenses to Israel citing concerns that the equipment could be used to violate international law.
- Israeli bombardment struck a group of people queuing to buy bread near the UNRWA al-Fakhoura school in the Jabalia refugee camp, killing at least eight Palestinians and leaving several others wounded.
- Israeli settlers set fire to olive trees in the village of Al-Lubban ash-Sharqiya, south of Nablus.
- A Palestinian man was beaten to death by Israeli forces in Jenin.
- The UKMTO said that two unspecified projectiles hit the Panama flagged and Greek-owned ship Blue Lagoon near the Yemeni Port of Salif, while a drone hit the Saudi-flagged and owned oil tanker Amjad near Al Hudaydah.
- An Israeli soldier destroyed the facade of a home in Tulkarm with a bulldozer.

=== 3 September ===
- The Gaza Health Ministry reported that at least 33 Palestinians were killed in Israeli attacks in the past 24 hours, increasing its count of the Palestinian death toll in Gaza to 40,819.
- A Palestinian child was killed in Tulkarm after he was shot in the head by an Israeli sniper. His father was also injured.
- Four women from the same family were killed in an Israeli strike in the Al-Tannour neighborhood east of Rafah.
- An Israeli strike on a residential house near al-Aqsa Hospital injured five children.
- Nine Palestinians including at least five children and one woman were killed in an Israeli bombing on a residential building in the vicinity of a municipal park in central Gaza City.
- Israeli forces killed two Palestinians in the Thanabeh area, east of Tulkarm.
- An Israeli airstrike struck a house in the Daraj neighbourhood of Gaza City, injuring several Palestinians including children.
- A Palestinian man and a child were shot by Israeli forces during a raid in Ad-Dhahiriya, south of Hebron.
- An Israeli airstrike targeting a college housing displaced people in Gaza City killed at least seven Palestinians and injured at least 30 people, while trapping dozens under the rubble. The IDF said that it had targeted a Hamas command and control centre in the building.
- The United States Department of Justice charged Hamas leader Yahya Sinwar and five other militants with conspiracy to provide material support for terrorism, conspiracy to murder Americans, and five other counts each over the 7 October attacks.
- An Israeli strike on a house in Deir el-Balah killed a woman and wounded the rest of the family including two children.

=== 4 September ===
- The Gaza Health Ministry reported that at least 42 Palestinians were killed in Israeli attacks in the past 24 hours, increasing its count of the Palestinian death toll in Gaza to 40,861.
- The Islamic Resistance in Iraq claimed it had executed a drone attack on the port of Haifa.
- Israeli forces arrested three people and shot one person in Nablus, and two people in Bethlehem including a 15-year-old in al-Khader.
- Activist Greta Thunberg was arrested after refusing to leave the University of Copenhagen during a pro-Palestinian protest.
- Israeli bombing in Khan Yunis killed two Palestinians including one child.
- Israeli forces bombed the Sheikh Zayed Towers in Northern Gaza, killing at least six people.
- The IDF claimed to have killed 200 militants and discovered dozens of weapons in Tel al-Sultan in the span of one week during its military operation in Rafah.
- Meta Platforms' content moderation board ruled that the usage of the pro-Palestinian phrase "From the River to the Sea" did not break its rules against incitement and hate speech.
- The first stage of polio inoculation in Gaza concluded after vaccine distribution took place from September 1–3. The WHO announced that over 187,000 children were vaccinated.
- 222 trucks with humanitarian goods passed from Israel to Gaza.

=== 5 September ===
- Israeli strikes struck tents sheltering displaced people in the vicinity of al-Aqsa Hospital killing four Palestinian men and injuring two children. The IDF claimed that it had precisely struck one command-and-control centre run by Hamas and PIJ.
- Israeli forces bombed a car in Tubas, killing five young men and injuring another. Israeli forces later shot and killed a 16-year-old boy in the Far'a refugee camp and dragged his body out using a bulldozer.
- Israeli forces forcibly displaced Palestinian families in Jenin's al-Jabariyat neighborhood and set a house on fire in the Jenin refugee camp. Israeli forces also bulldozed the Nazareth Street, north of Jenin. Israeli forces forced six Palestinian families to evacuate in al-Damaj and Jorat al-Dahab neighbourhoods of the Jenin refugee camp.
- An Israeli strike in the vicinity of Kamal Adwan Hospital killed three Palestinians and injured many people including children.
- A Palestinian girl was shot by Israeli forces during a raid in Husan, west of Bethlehem.
- Four aid trucks with tents, food, and water were looted in the Gaza strip.
- Israel paused operations in the Al Awad neighborhood in Deir al Balah to allow the delivery of humanitarian aid.

=== 6 September ===
- An Israeli strike struck a home in the Tell al-Hawa neighbourhood of Gaza City, killing a Palestinian woman and her child and trapping several people under the rubble.
- Turkish-American activist Ayşenur Ezgi Eygi was killed after she was shot in the head by an Israeli sniper while participating in a protest against Israeli settlement expansion in Beita, Nablus. Another person was injured by shrapnel in the same incident.
- Two women and two children were killed in an Israeli airstrike on the Nuseirat refugee camp.
- A 13-year-old girl was killed by Israeli forces during a raid in Qaryut, south of Nablus.
- Eight Palestinians were killed and 15 people were wounded in an Israeli strike in a school sheltering displaced people in Jabalia. The IDF said that it had targeted a Hamas command center inside the school.
- The IDF concluded its large-scale West Bank military operation that had begun on 28 August.

=== 7 September ===
- The Gaza Health Ministry reported that at least 61 Palestinians were killed in Israeli attacks in the past 48 hours, increasing its count of the Palestinian death toll in Gaza to 40,939.
- An Israeli strike on an apartment building in the Bureij refugee camp killed at least four members of a Palestinian family and injured several others.
- An Israeli missile attack struck an apartment building in the Nasr neighbourhood of Gaza City, killing four Palestinians, including a girl, and injuring 10 people.
- An Israeli strike in the Nuseirat refugee camp killed eight Palestinians, including one child.
- An Israeli strike on the Amr Ibn al-Aas School, which was converted into an evacuation centre in the Sheikh Radwan neighbourhood in Gaza City, killed at least eight Palestinians and injured 20 people. The IDF said it had targeted a group of Hamas militants in a command room embedded inside the building.
- Israeli shelling in the Nuseirat refugee camp also killed five Palestinians, including three women and two children.
- A staff of the Palestinian Centre for Human Rights, his wife and two daughters were wounded; and his two brother-in-laws were killed in an Israeli airstrike on their apartment building located north of Gaza City.

=== 8 September ===
- The Gaza Health Ministry reported that at least 33 Palestinians were killed in Israeli attacks in the past 24 hours, increasing its count of the Palestinian death toll in Gaza to 40,972.
- Two Israeli missiles struck a tent in the Jabalia refugee camp, killing at least eight Palestinians, including a woman.
- An Israeli bomb hit a house in the Jabalia refugee camp, killing a Hamas official who was the deputy director of the Palestinian Civil Defense in north Gaza and his three family members and injuring and trapping several people including women and children under the rubble.
- An Israeli strike struck an apartment in the Bureij refugee camp, killing a woman and her child.
- A gun attack killed three Israeli civilians at the Allenby Bridge, which connects the West Bank and Jordan. Following the shooting, all Israeli land crossings with Jordan were closed, including Allenby Bridge, the Rabin crossing near Eilat and the Jordan River crossing near Beit She'an.
- An Israeli missile strike killed at least two Palestinians including a woman and her child in Khan Yunis.
- Israeli shelling hit a home in the Tuffah neighbourhood of eastern Gaza City, killing one Palestinian child and injuring several others.
- 208 trucks with humanitarian goods passed from Israel to Gaza.
- PIJ claimed responsibility for two rockets fired at Ashkelon from the Gaza Strip.
- The US is reportedly considering next steps on ceasefire negotiations due to added demands by Hamas. The Hamas denied the claim of US officials and said that it accepted January 2025 Gaza war ceasefire.

=== 9 September ===
- The Gaza Health Ministry reported that at least 16 Palestinians were killed in Israeli attacks in the past 24 hours, increasing its count of the Palestinian death toll in Gaza to 40,988.
- Israeli missile strikes hit Al-Mawasi, Khan Yunis Governorate, an Israeli-designated "safe zone". 19 to 40 people were killed, over 60 others were injured and trapped several people under the rubble. The IDF said that it targeted militants involved in Hamas-led October 7 attack, and a Hamas command and control center. The Hamas denied the claim.
- Around midnight between 8–9 September, Israeli airstrikes in Syria targeted a chemical arms research facility in Masyaf, a site on the Masyaf-Wadi al-Uyun road, a site in the Hayr Abbas area of Masyaf, two sites in Al-Rawi village and air defence factories south-southwest of Masyaf near Al-Bayda village. The airstrikes killed at least 27 people, including six civilians, four Syrian Army soldiers, eleven Syrians working with Iranian militias, two Hezbollah fighters and three unidentified people, according to the Syrian Observatory for Human Rights. However, Syrian authorities claimed that 18 people were killed in Israeli airstrikes.
- Israel authorities delivered a notice of their intent to seize Palestinian land in Asira al-Qibliya, Burin and Madama, south of Nablus.
- Six Palestinians including a woman and two children were killed, and several others were trapped under rubble after an Israeli strike on a residential home in Jabalia.
- The IDF determined after months of investigation that an airstrike which targeted militant Ahmed Ghandour also mistakenly killed three Israeli hostages: Nik Beizer, Ron Sherman, and Elia Toledano.

=== 10 September ===
- The Gaza Health Ministry reported that at least 32 Palestinians were killed in Israeli attacks in the past 24 hours, increasing its count of the Palestinian death toll in Gaza to 41,020.
- A prominent Hezbollah member, Muhammad Qassem al-Shaer, a commander of the Redwan Force, was assassinated by Israel through a drone strike on his motorcycle in the village of Qaraoun in the Beqaa Valley, Lebanon.
- September 2024 Al-Mawasi refugee camp attack by the IDF.
- Israeli bombs struck a residential apartment in north Gaza, killing five Palestinians, including two women and one child.
- Israeli bombs hit a food stand in the al-Shawa Square area in eastern Gaza City, killing at least five Palestinians.
- A Palestinian man and woman were killed by Israeli forces during a raid in Tulkarm.
- Israeli bombardment in the Bureij refugee camp killed a Palestinian girl and injured several others.
- 176 trucks carrying humanitarian aid passed from Israel to Gaza.
- Israel paused operations in the Abu Ra-ida neighborhood in Khan Yunis to allow the delivery of humanitarian aid.

=== 11 September ===
- The Gaza Health Ministry reported that at least 64 Palestinians were killed in Israeli attacks in the past 24 hours, increasing its count of the Palestinian death toll in Gaza to 41,084.
- An Israeli airstrike on a family home in eastern Khan Yunis killed at least 11 Palestinians including an infant.
- Israeli bombing on a home in Jabalia killed at least nine Palestinians including three children and two women.
- Wafa reported that Israeli navy fire near al-Mawasi killed a fisherman.
- A vehicle-ramming attack near the illegal settlement of Beit El killed an Indian origin-Israeli soldier.
- An IAF UH-60 Black Hawk helicopter crashed in Rafah while trying to evacuate a critically injured combat engineer, killing two soldiers and injuring seven others and bringing the IDF death toll in the Gaza Strip to 344.
- One person was killed in an Israeli drone strike in Meiss Ej Jabal in southern Lebanon.
- An Israeli airstrike on the UNRWA-run Al-Jawni school building, which was being used as a shelter in the Nuseirat refugee camp, killed at least 18 people including women, children and six UNRWA staff and injured at least 44 people. The IDF said that the IAF had struck a Hamas command and control centre, and listed the militants killed in the attack, such as a member of Hamas who fired mortars at troops, militants involved in the October 7 attack on Israel, and other members of Hamas' military wing.
- An Israeli strike on a house in southeast Khan Yunis killed one Palestinian child and wounded several others.
- Israeli airstrikes on a group of people waiting to buy bread outside a bakery in the al-Nasr neighbourhood of Gaza City killed three Palestinians and injured seven people.
- Three Palestinians were killed in an Israeli airstrike in Tulkarm. The IDF said the strike was part of a counter-terrorism operation.
- UNWRA reported that in recent days more than half a million children in Gaza Strip were vaccinated against Polio.
- Israeli bombardment of a residential apartment in the Tuffah neighbourhood of northern Gaza City killed at least four Palestinians including a woman and a child.

=== 12 September ===
- The Gaza Health Ministry reported that at least 34 Palestinians were killed in Israeli attacks in the past 24 hours, increasing its count of the Palestinian death toll in Gaza to 41,118.
- Two Syrians, including a "military figure", were killed in an Israeli missile strike on a car in Khan Arnabah in the Golan Heights.
- The World Health Organization reported reaching the target of polio vaccination for children of the Gaza strip.
- Wafa reported an Israeli strike on a home in Khan Yunis killed four Palestinian civilians including two brothers.
- Wafa reported that an Israeli drone strike killed a Palestinian civilian while riding a bicycle in the Qizan Rashwan area of southern Khan Yunis.
- Israeli bombardment wounded two children in the Shuja'iyya neighbourhood of Gaza City.
- The IDF claimed that it dismantled Hamas's Rafah brigade. It also claimed to have killed at least 2,308 militants, destroyed more than 13 km (8 miles) of tunnels and killed almost 250 militants in Tal as-Sultan in its operation in Rafah in recent weeks including a battalion commander and majority of the chain of command.
- An IDF gunfire in ad-Dhahiriya injured a child.

=== 13 September ===
- Israeli strikes including in Israeli-designated "safe zones" killed at least 19 Palestinians including women and children.
- The Palestinian Civil Defense reported that an Israeli bombardment on a house in al-Ishrin Street of the Nuseirat refugee camp killed a Palestinian woman and child and injured other people.
- The Palestinian Civil Defense reported that an Israeli strike on a house in al-Mawasi killed at least five Palestinians including two children.

=== 14 September ===
- The Gaza Health Ministry reported that at least 64 Palestinians were killed in Israeli attacks in the past 48 hours, increasing its count of the Palestinian death toll in Gaza to 41,182.
- An Israeli strike on a house in the Shujayea neighbourhood of Gaza City killed a Palestinian woman and injured several others.
- An Israeli strike on a house in the Tuffah neighbourhood of Gaza City killed at least 11 Palestinians including at least four children and three women and trapped several people under the rubble.
- An Israeli strike on a home in Nuseirat refugee camp killed two Palestinians and wounded others including children.
- An Israeli strike in the vicinity of a school in the northwest of Gaza City killed at least five Palestinians. The IDF claimed that it struck two buildings used by Hamas operatives for attacks and producing weapons.
- Two rockets were fired from Gaza at Ashkelon. One was intercepted and the other landed in the sea.
- An Israeli airstrike on a school used as shelter by displaced people in Gaza City killed at least five Palestinians including two children and a woman. The IDF said that it struck a group of Hamas operatives in a command room inside the building.

=== 15 September ===
- The Gaza Health Ministry reported that at least 24 Palestinians were killed in Israeli attacks in the past 24 hours, increasing its count of the Palestinian death toll in Gaza to 41,206.
- A "new hypersonic ballistic missile" from Houthi-controlled Yemen was launched towards Israel. The missile was partially intercepted, with pieces landing in fields and near a railway station within Central Israel. There were no direct injuries, but nine people were slightly injured while seeking cover. The missile was characterized as "the longest range" missile to have ever hit Israel, with the Houthis claiming that the missile had travelled 2,040 kilometres.
- Israeli forces clashed with Palestinians during a raid in Zeita, northwest of Tulkarm and the villages of Madama, Urif and Yitma, all south of Nablus. Israeli forces also raided Dar Salah and al-Khader near Bethlehem and attacked Deir Abu Mash'al, Umm Safa and Qarawat Bani Zeid near Ramallah.
- An Israeli strike in Nuseirat refugee camp killed the daughter and a son of a Palestinian Civil Defence officer and injured 15 others.
- An Israeli strike on a house in Sheikh Radwan neighbourhood of Gaza City killed a Palestinian girl and an elderly man and injured several others.
- An Israeli airstrike was reported on a school used as shelter by displaced people in Beit Hanoun. The IDF said that it targeted a group of Hamas operatives hiding in a command and control center inside the building, which it said was used for preparing rocket attacks.
- Palestinian Civil Defence reported that an Israeli airstrike on a water tanker in Central Gaza killed at least one Palestinian.
- An Israel Border Police officer was slightly injured in a stabbing attack at the Damascus Gate. The attacker, an Israeli citizen from the Arab town of Ar'ara, was shot dead by Israeli police.
- An Israeli strike on a home in Sheikh Radwan neighbourhood of northern Gaza City killed four Palestinians including a woman and two children went missing.
- An Israeli airstrike on a house in Zeitoun, Gaza killed six Palestinians including two children.
- An Israeli raid on a Palestinian family in Hebron resulted in a miscarriage for a pregnant Palestinian woman.
- 163 trucks carrying humanitarian aid passed from Israel to Gaza.

=== 16 September ===
- The Gaza Health Ministry reported that at least 20 Palestinians were killed in Israeli attacks in the past 24 hours, increasing its count of the Palestinian death toll in Gaza to 41,226.
- An Israeli strike on a home in Nuseirat refugee camp killed 10 Palestinians including children and women and injured 15 people.
- A Jewish goat herder and his companion were injured in an alteraction with Palestinians in an area near Mevo'ot Yericho that is "off-limits to Jews". In response, a group of Israeli settlers attacked Palestinian children and teachers at a school in the vicinity, injuring seven. Palestine Chronicle reported that the school's principal and other teachers were detained by Israeli soldiers escorting them.
- An Israeli strike on a bakery in a camp in al-Mawasi killed five Palestinians and wounded others.
- An Israel shelling on a group of people gathered near al-Nada residential towers of Beit Hanoun killed three Palestinian men.
- An Israeli strike on a tent sheltering displaced people in the vicinity of Khan Younis killed six Palestinians including children.
- An Israel strike in Gaza City killed six Palestinians including two children.
- A Palestinian woman was wounded and several Palestinians were assaulted by Israeli settlers in Hebron.
- An Israel strike on a house in southwest Gaza City killed three Palestinians including a woman and a child.
- IDF confirmed the death of the head of PIJ Rafah rocket unit in a drone strike in Khan Yunis. There is no confirmation from PIJ.
- 168 trucks carrying humanitarian aid passed from Israel to Gaza, along with 2 nobile clinics and 6 gas tankers.
- Israel paused operations in the Abu Ra-ida neighborhood in Khan Yunis to allow the delivery of humanitarian aid.

=== 17 September ===
- The Gaza Health Ministry reported that at least 26 Palestinians were killed in Israeli attacks in the past 24 hours, increasing its count of the Palestinian death toll in Gaza to 41,252.
- An Israel strike on a house in the Sabra neighbourhood of Gaza City killed at least three Palestinians including a woman and a child.
- Israeli artillery and air strikes on a residential building in Bureij refugee camp killed eight Palestinians and trapped an estimated 80 people under the rubble. Palestinian Civil Defence said that Israeli jets targeted them when they arrived at the site and one of their staff was wounded, forcing them to pull back.
- Israeli forces arrested over 30 Palestinians in the West Bank, including a child, a journalist and the wife of PFLP leader Ahmad Sa'adat.
- The Shin Bet claimed to have thwarted a Hezbollah attempt to assassinate a former senior defence official with a claymore mine.
- At least 12 people were killed and thousands of others including Hezbollah members and civilians were wounded across Lebanon and Syria following explosions of thousands of pagers used by Hezbollah. Among those injured was the Iranian ambassador to Lebanon, Mojtaba Amani.
- 182 trucks carrying humanitarian aid passed from Israel to Gaza.
- Israel paused operations in the Abu Ali neighborhood in Khan Yunis to allow the delivery of humanitarian aid.
- An explosion in a building in Tel al-Sultan killed four Israeli soldiers and injured five others, bringing the IDF death toll to 348. A female paramedic was killed in the explosion, making her the first female Israeli soldier killed in the invasion of Gaza.

=== 18 September ===
- The Gaza Health Ministry reported that at least 20 Palestinians were killed in Israeli attacks in the past 24 hours, increasing its count of the Palestinian death toll in Gaza to 41,272.
- Wafa reported that Palestinian Red Crescent crews were attacked by Israeli soldiers while trying to “trying to evacuate a sick child” in Nablus.
- The US military confirmed that the Houthi movement had downed two MQ-9 Reaper drones within a week.
- Israeli forces bombed a vehicle on the road in al-Mawasi opposite the Red Cross field hospital in Rafah, killing two people and injuring at least eleven more.
- Israeli forces bombed the Ibn al-Haytham School in Shujayea, killing eight people including five women and children and injuring more. The IDF said that it precisely struck a group of Hamas operatives in a command room inside the building.
- A Palestinian man was assaulted by Israeli settlers in Khallet al-Dabaa in Masafer Yatta.
- Another series of explosions involving Hezbollah communication devices occurred across Lebanon. At least 30 people were killed, while 750 others were injured.
- Israeli strikes killed at least 48 Palestinians including nine children.
- Israeli soldiers killed a 16 year old Palestinian boy in Shu’fat refugee camp. Israeli soldiers shot and killed another Palestinian teenager near Nilin, west of Ramallah.
- 182 trucks carrying humanitarian aid passed from Israel to Gaza.
- Israel paused operations in the Al Awad neighborhood to allow the delivery of humanitarian aid.

=== 19 September ===
- The Palestinian Information Center and Shehab News Agency reported that an Israeli strike on a house in Jabalia refugee camp killed a Palestinian couple. Palestinian Civil Defence said that the male victim was its member, while the female victim was pregnant.
- Wafa reported that an Israeli quadcopter strike in Nuseirat refugee camp wounded numerous civilians, the majority of them children.
- An Israeli air strike in southern Gaza killed Ahmed al-Ghoul, the brother of Ismail al-Ghoul.
- Al Jazeera reported that Israeli artillery strikes caused civilian casualties in Nuseirat refugee camp.
- Hezbollah's chief, Hassan Nasrallah delivered a speech in response to the explostions of Hezbollah's communication devices that took place earlier in the week. In his speech, Nasrallah acknowledged that Hezbollah suffered an "unprecedented blow", and accused Israel of effectively declaring war against Hezbollah.
- Areas near the northern Israeli town of Beit Hillel were hit by drones from Lebanon. A projectile also hit Ya'ara, reportedly injuring several people.
- Two Israeli soldiers were killed in Hezbollah attacks in the vicinity of the Lebanese border.
- Israeli artillery shelling killed two Palestinians including a child in Zeitoun neighbourhood of Gaza City.
- Al Jazeera reported that Israeli gunfire in Qabatiya injured a Palestinian child. The IDF said that it killed seven Palestinian gunmen including a commander of a local militant group. Israeli soldiers were later seen throwing the bodies of four Palestinians, including one suspected militant, from a roof before seizing them. The IDF said that it was investigating the incident.
- Al Jazeera reported that an Israeli strike on a house in Daraj neighbourhood of Gaza City killed seven Palestinians including two women.
- Al Jazeera reported that an Israeli strike on a house in Jabalia killed six Palestinians including three children.
- Israel paused operations in the Rov neighborhood to allow the delivery of humanitarian aid.
- The al Aqsa Martyrs' Brigades claimed a shooting attack on an IDF outpost on Mount Ebal.
- The IDF said that 100 launchers and 1000 ready-to-launch rockets were destroyed on airstrikes by IAF's fighter jets.

=== 20 September ===
- An Israeli strike on a home in Nuseirat refugee camp killed nine Palestinians including three children and four women and wounded several others.
- Syrian state media reported that an Israeli strike on a car carrying a "senior figure" to Damascus airport killed at least one person. This strike killed a senior commander of Kataib Hezbollah and wounded another person.
- Israeli airstrikes on two houses in the Mesbah area of Rafah killed at least 13 Palestinians including women and children.
- Israel launched an airstrike in Dahieh, Beirut targeting Hezbollah's operations commander Ibrahim Aqil. At least 45 people, including Aqil, senior Hezbollah commander Ahmed Mahmoud Wahabi, 13 other high ranking Hezbollah militants, three children and seven women were killed, while 68 others were injured.
- Israeli forces stormed Anabta. The IDF also shot an injured a Palestinian in the Rachel's Tomb compound, north of Bethlehem.
- Palestinians including a woman and two children were wounded in a pepper spray attack by Israeli settlers in Deir Nidham.
- An Israeli strike on a house in Daraj neighbourhood of Gaza City killed six Palestinians including two women.
- An Israeli strike on a house in the centre of Gaza City killed six Palestinians including three children and two women.
- Five children were retrieved from under the rubble of a targeted house in Zeitoun neighborhood of Gaza City.
- The IAF said that it struck 20 targets including Hamas military buildings and militants, killing several militants including prominent member Muhammad Mansour.

=== 21 September ===
- The Gaza Health Ministry reported that at least 119 Palestinians were killed in Israeli attacks in the past 72 hours, increasing its count of the Palestinian death toll in Gaza to 41,391.
- At least two civilians were killed in an air strike in Nuseirat.
- An air strike on an apartment in the Batn as-Sameen area of southern Khan Yunis killed six Palestinians including three women.
- The Gaza Health Ministry said that five of its workers were killed and several others were wounded in an Israeli strike in its warehouses in the Musbah area of southern Gaza.
- An Israeli air strike on Zeitoun school in Gaza City killed at least 21 Palestinians including 13 children and six women including a pregnant woman and injured at least 30 others including nine children. The IDF claimed that it targeted a group of Hamas operatives in a command room inside the building, which it said was used to carry out attacks against Israeli targets.
- The IDF claimed to have "almost completely dismantled" Hezbollah's military chain of command.
- Israeli forces wounded a 15-year old Palestinian boy in Qarawat Bani Hassan.
- The al Aqsa Martyrs' Brigades claimed a shooting attack on an IDF outpost on Mount Gerizim.
- Israeli police arrested a Palestinian woman carrying a large knife and a fake ID in a school in Hod Hasharon.

=== 22 September ===
- The Gaza Health Ministry reported that at least 40 Palestinians were killed in Israeli attacks in the past 24 hours, increasing its count of the Palestinian death toll in Gaza to 41,431.
- Hezbollah attacked the Israeli Ramat David Airbase using Fadi-1 and Wadi-2 missiles, injuring one person while a separate Hezbollah attack on the Krayot and Lower Galilee regions injured three people.
- The Islamic Resistance in Iraq claimed a drone attack on an unspecified "vital target" in Israel and launched four other attacks.
- Israeli forces raided the Al Jazeera bureau in Ramallah, confiscating equipment and tearing down a poster of slain Al Jazeera journalist Shireen Abu Akleh before ordering the office's closure for 45 days.
- An Israeli soldier of the Kfir Brigade's Haruv Reconnaissance Unit was "seriously injured" during clashes in Jenin.
- Hezbollah claimed an attack on a complex belonging to the Israeli Rafael Company which specializes in electronic equipment in retaliation to the pager attacks.
- Israeli soldiers injured three Palestinians including two children in the Old City of Nablus.
- An Israeli airstrike on the Kafr Qasim School which was serving as shelter for displaced Palestinians in Al-Shati refugee camp killed seven Palestinians including two children. The IDF claimed that it struck Hamas operatives operating from the school.
- Four Palestinians were found dead after Israeli forces attacked the al-Attatirah area, east of Rafah, two people were killed by Israeli shelling in Khuza'a, east of Khan Younis and a Palestinian was killed after an Israeli quadcopter opened fire on civilians west of the Nuseirat camp.
- An Israeli airstrike on Khaled bin al-Walid school which was serving as shelter for displaced Palestinians in Nuseirat refugee camp killed three Palestinians including a woman and her child and several people were injured. The IDF said that it struck Hamas operatives in a command and control center inside the compound.

=== 23 September ===
- The Gaza Health Ministry reported that at least 24 Palestinians were killed in Israeli attacks in the past 24 hours, increasing its count of the Palestinian death toll in Gaza to 41,455.
- An Israeli strike on a home in the vicinity of Al-Aqsa Martyrs Hospital killed five Palestinians including a woman and her four children.
- The Islamic Resistance in Iraq said that it launched a drone attack on observation base of the IDF's Golani Brigade.
- A worker at the Lachish IDF base was killed after attempting to carry out a stabbing attack.
- Lebanese were warned to avoid homes that store Hezbollah's missiles through SMS messages and the IDF.
- An Israeli drone strike in Khuza’a injured many Palestinians including children.
- The IDF conducted over 1,600 strikes in Lebanon, killing at least 558 people and injuring more than 1,835 others including children, women and paramedics according to the Lebanese Health Ministry. The IDF said that it struck several Hezbollah targets including weapons directly threatening Israel in Lebanese homes.
- A Hamas field commander was killed in an Israeli airstrike in southern Lebanon.
- The al Aqsa Martyrs' Brigades clashed with Israeli forces near the illegal settlements of Kokhav Ya'akov and Karmei Tzur.

=== 24 September ===
- The Gaza Health Ministry reported that at least 12 Palestinians were killed in Israeli attacks in the past 24 hours, increasing its count of the Palestinian death toll in Gaza to 41,467.
- The Islamic Resistance in Iraq stated that it launched a drone strike on a target in the Golan Heights.
- A resident of East Jerusalem was detained for allegedly "identifying with a terrorist organization" and for wearing an item linked to the Islamic State.
- Hezbollah launched a Fadi-2 missile targeting an airfiled near Afula and an alleged explosives factory.
- An Israeli soldier was arrested while on holiday in Marrakesh and will be tried in Morocco for "committing war crimes" in Gaza.
- Israeli settlers attacked Palestinian shepherds in the Hamma area, northern Jordan Valley.
- An Israeli air strike on a home in Nuseirat refugee camp killed six Palestinians including three women and injured 21 people. A separate Israeli air strike in Nuseirat refugee camp killed 11 Palestinians. Israeli forces later targeted an ambulance near al-Awda Hospital in the Nuseirat refugee camp.
- An Israeli air strike on a residential house in al-Tawam area of northwest Gaza City killed four Palestinians including two children.
- An Israeli airstrike on a home in al-Nasr area of northeast Rafah killed a Palestinian woman and her four children.
- Israeli forces bombed a house in Bureij, killing three people.
- A Palestinian man was injured during an Israeli raid in Azzun, east of Qalqilya.
- The PIJ announced that two of their fighters from its Syria-based Martyr Ali al Aswad Brigade were killed in southern Lebanon, the Popular Resistance Committees also announced that one of their fighters died in southern Lebanon.

=== 25 September ===
- The Gaza Health Ministry reported that at least 28 Palestinians were killed in Israeli attacks in the past 24 hours, increasing its count of the Palestinian death toll in Gaza to 41,495.
- Israel returned 88 bodies to Gaza in a container truck, providing no information about the names, ages, or location where the victims had been killed. Health officials at Nasser Hospital refused to bury the bodies until they were identified.
- Al Jazeera English reported that Israeli strikes in Karak killed 15 civilians.
- An Israeli strike on a home in Hay al-Nasr, northeast of Rafah, killed a Palestinian woman and her five children.
- The Islamic Resistance in Iraq said that it launched a drone strike targeting an IDF site in the Golan Heights.
- Three people were killed after Israeli forces bombed a house in the Zinjo neighbourhood, south of Gaza City.
- Al Jazeera reported that the agricultural land was destroyed during an IDF raid in Beit Lahia.
- At least three people were killed and 13 others were injured in an Israeli airstrike on Ain Qana, Lebanon.
- Four people were killed and seven others were wounded in an Israeli airstrike on Joun, Lebanon.
- Al-Manar journalist and cameraman Kamel Karaki was killed in an Israeli airstrike in Qantara, southern Lebanon.
- Three people were killed in an Israeli airstrike on Maaysrah, northern Lebanon.
- Four people were killed in an Israeli airstrike targeting Bint Jbeil, southern Lebanon.
- Two people were killed and 27 injured during the bombardment of Tebnine, southern Lebanon.
- At least seven people were killed and 38 others were injured in Israeli airstrikes in the Baalbek-Hermel Governorate of northeastern Lebanon.
- Israeli forces critically injured a doctor in Azzun.
- A pregnant Palestinian woman and her four children including a seven-month old infant were among the six people killed in an Israeli air strike on a home in the Bureij refugee camp.
- An Israeli strike in Maroun al-Ras injured two people.
- An Israeli strike in Ainata injured one person.
- Hezbollah missile strikes in Sa'ar injured two people.
- Seven hundred British soldiers were sent to British-controlled parts of Cyprus in preparation to evacuate UK citizens from Lebanon.
- The IDF claimed to have destroyed 60 Hezbollah intelligence directorate targets.
- The IAF struck a total of 280 Hezbollah sites across Lebanon, including weapons depots and rocket launchers. The Lebanese Health Ministry announced that at least 72 people were killed and 392 others were injured in the attacks.
- Five people including an infant were killed in an Israeli air strike in Chehour.
- A Palestinian woman was killed and at least four others including two women, a child and an elderly man were injured by Israeli gunfire in Anzah.
- An Israeli air strike on a house in Byblos killed one person.
- Four Palestinians including two women were killed in an Israeli air strike on a house northeast of Rafah.
- Two drones were launched at Eilat from Iraq. One drone struck the Port of Eilat, slightly injuring two people, and the other was intercepted.
- A Hezbollah rocket hit a cable car at the Mount Hermon ski resort.
- Global Affairs Canada announced that two Canadian citizens were killed by Israeli attacks in Lebanon.
- An explosion in Tyre caused a nearby building to collapse, killing a French citizen.
- IDF chief Herzi Halevi said that the airstrikes in Lebanon were laying the foundation for a ground offensive into Lebanon.
- Hezbollah claimed that its air defense units forced two Israeli aircraft to return from Lebanese airspace and said that it targeted Kiryat Motzkin with rockets and Fadi-1 missiles.
- The IDF said that it killed over 40 Hamas operatives.

=== 26 September ===
- The Gaza Health Ministry reported that at least 39 Palestinians were killed in Israeli attacks in the past 24 hours, increasing its count of the Palestinian death toll in Gaza to 41,534.
- The IAF struck a total of 280 Hezbollah sites across Lebanon, including weapons depots and rocket launchers. The Lebanese Health Ministry announced that at least 72 people were killed and 392 others were injured in the attacks.
- Three people were killed by Israeli bombings in Ayta ash Shab, while a Syrian national was killed and three injured in Qana.
- Israeli forces bombed Tyre, resulting in two killed and one wounded in Cadmus, five wounded in Burj al-Shemali, four wounded in Tyre proper, two wounded in al-Qalila, one wounded in Hanaouay and one wounded in Houmayri.
- An Israeli strike in Sheikh Radwan killed a Palestinian child.
- An Israeli strike on a three-storey building in Younine killed at least 19 Syrians and a Lebanese, majority of them women or children and injured eight others.
- Approximately 45 rockets were launched from Lebanon towards northern Israel.
- Hezbollah said that its missiles targeted Rafael Advanced Defense Systems facilities in the Zevulun area.
- Three people were killed after Israeli forces bombed a house in eastern Khan Yunis.
- An Israeli air strike destroyed a bridge in the Lebanese side of the Lebanon–Syria border in the northeastern Hermel region and injured five people. The IDF claimed that it destroyed an infrastructure used by Hezbollah to transfer weapons from Syria.
- The IDF conducted a 15 hours raid in Jenin.
- An Israeli strike on Hafsa al-Faluja School in Jabalia used by displaced people as a shelter killed at least 15 Palestinians including women and children and wounded others. The IDF claimed that it targeted Hamas members who planned attacks targeting Israel in a command and control centre inside the compound.
- An Israeli airstrike in Dahieh targeting Mohammed Hussein Srur, the commander of Hezbollah's drone unit, killed two people and injured at least 15 others including a woman.
- Hezbollah fired more than 130 rockets into northern Israel, striking areas in Mount Meron, Safed, Birya and Kiryat Ata, injuring an Israeli man.
- Al Jazeera Arabic reported that an Israeli strike on a civilian car in Bureij refugee camp killed a Palestinian and others were wounded.
- A missile was launched from Yemen towards Tel Aviv.
- An elderly French woman was killed in an Israeli strike in southern Lebanon.
- An aid worker from the US-based charity organization HEAL Palestine was killed in her car by Palestinian gunmen in Khan Yunis.
