= Hamama School bombing =

August 2024 bombing of a school in an Israeli attack

- Part of the Gaza war
- Location: Sheikh Radwan, Gaza City
- Date: 4 August 2024
- Target: Hamama school
- Attack type: Aerial bombing
- Deaths: 17+ Palestinians
- Injuries: 60+ Palestinians
- Perpetrator: Israel Defense Forces

On 4 August 2024, the Israel Defense Forces (IDF) bombed Hamama School in the neighborhood of Sheikh Radwan, Gaza City. The school had been sheltering people displaced by the Israeli invasion of the Gaza Strip, including women and children. Per Gaza's Civil Defense, 17 people were killed and "many others" were wounded, while the school itself was "completely destroyed". The attack was one of a number of attacks on schools during the Israeli invasion of Gaza.

The Israeli army stated that the school was being used by Hamas to plan and carry out attacks against Israeli troops, as well as to manufacture and store weapons. Hamas criticized this claim as a false pretext "for targeting defenseless civilians". The Palestinian resistance movement called the attack a continuation of Israel's "brutal war of extermination" in Gaza.

== Background ==
On 6 July, United Nations Relief and Works Agency for Palestine Refugees in the Near East (UNRWA)-ran al-Jawni school sheltering 2,000 refugees at the Nuseirat refugee camp in central Gaza was targeted by an IDF raid which killed sixteen Palestinians. On 7 July, the IDF targeted the Latin Patriarchate-owned Holy Family School located in Gaza City housing hundreds of refugees, killing four. On 8 July, IDF force struck a different Nuseirat UNRWA-run school in, causing several injuries requiring treatment in a local hospital. Philippe Lazzarini, the head of UNRWA, stated two-thirds of all UNRWA schools in the Gaza Strip had been hit since October 2023.

A United Nations Security Council Resolution adopted on 25 March 2024 had demanded an immediate ceasefire in the Gaza war. The attack on the Hamama School coincided with truce talks in Egypt.

== Attack ==
On 4 August, Israeli aircraft struck the Hamama School with a missile. Then, while first responders were rescuing victims of the initial strike, three additional missiles were fired at the school, killing more people and trapping some under rubble. This tactic is commonly used by the Israeli military. No warning was given prior to the first strike.

Women and children were among the casualties. According to the Gaza Civil Defense, the al-Hamama School was targeted alongside the adjacent al-Huda School, which share a playground.

== See also ==
- Timeline of the Gaza war (13 July 2024 – 26 September 2024)
- Timeline of the Israeli–Palestinian conflict in 2024
- Outline of the Gaza war
- Israeli war crimes in the Gaza war
- Gaza genocide
- Attacks on schools during the Israeli invasion of Gaza
