= Lehi Street bombing =

August 2024 attack in Israel

- Part of the Gaza war
- Location: Lehi Street (Note: Street named after the 1940's militant group named Lehi), Tel Aviv, Israel
- Date: 18 August 2024 c. 20:00 (UTC+2)
- Target: unknown
- Attack type: suicide bombing
- Weapon: Explosives in a backpack
- Deaths: 1 (attacker)
- Injuries: 1 (bystander)
- Perpetrators: Hamas; PIJ
- Assailant: Jafar Muna
- Motive: Palestinian political violence

The Lehi Street bombing was a failed suicide bombing in Lehi Street (Hebrew: רחוב לח"י) in Tel Aviv, Israel, on August 18, 2024. Hamas claimed responsibility for the attack, stating it was executed in collaboration with Palestinian Islamic Jihad. The premature detonation resulted in the death of the attacker and injuries to a 33-year-old bystander.

Israeli security forces confirmed the use of a powerful explosive device and the attack's terrorist nature. Following this incident, Hamas' militant wing declared a return to suicide attacks in Israeli cities, a strategy they had largely abandoned since the 2000s.

The bombing occurred shortly after the arrival of US Secretary of State Antony Blinken in Tel Aviv to negotiate a ceasefire and hostage deal in the Gaza war.

== Background ==
The use of suicide bombings (Arabic: العمليات الاستشهادية, romanized: martyrdom operations) by Palestinian factions emerged in the 1990s. Between 1994 and 2005, these attacks resulted in 735 Israeli deaths and 4,554 injuries, predominantly targeting Israeli civilians at locations such as shopping centers, public buses, transit stations, cafes, nightclubs, and restaurants. The tactic peaked during the Second Intifada (2000–2005), garnering significant Palestinian support and leading to the formation of a martyrdom cult around the attackers.

Suicide bombings in the 1990s and 2000s had a profound impact on Israel's civilian population, significantly affecting Israeli society and hardening attitudes toward Palestinians as potential peace partners in a two-state solution. These attacks influenced Israeli Prime Minister Ariel Sharon's decision to build the West Bank barrier. By 2005, Hamas shifted its strategy from suicide attacks to adopting a Hezbollah-like approach, leveraging Iranian support and smuggling routes to develop a substantial rocket arsenal, using it to attack Israeli urban centers. Hamas and other groups have also shifted to other forms of violence, including shootings, stabbings, and car ramming attacks.

Hamas has justified suicide bombings both practically and doctrinally. Practically, they have emphasized the harm and deterrence these attacks inflict on Israeli society. Doctrinally, they have glorified martyrdom as the highest form of jihad and Islamic belief. Hamas has framed suicide attacks as a testament to "Palestinian innovative genius" and has contended that they establish a "balance of fear" by causing significant casualties and psychological distress in Israel.

In the weeks before the Lehi Street bombing, Israel is thought to have assassinated two of the three top leaders of Hamas. On 31 July 2024, Ismail Haniyeh was killed in a bombing in Iran. Israel have not officially claimed the attack but no other assailant has been credibly accused.

In 2014, left wing UK news outlet Novara Media attributed the Qassam Brigades' temporary abandonment of suicide attacks to Mohammed Deif's leadership moving the Brigades towards hostage taking and rocket attacks. By contrast, in 2024 pro-Israel media lobby group CAMERA held Deif personally responsible for the deaths of 80 Israeli civilians, mostly in suicide bombings, when they criticized the way BBC Arabic reported on an Israeli airstrike intended to kill Deif. The airstrike killed over 90 people, and in a biography summary that BBC Arabic aired with their report in the incident they mentioned suicide bombings attributed to Deif but used language CAMERA objected to, allegedly referring to the bombings as "military operations" when CAMERA thought they should be referred to as "terrorist attacks".

== Bombing ==
The bombing occurred on the night of Sunday 18 August 2023, on Lehi street in Tel Aviv.

The attack was carried out by a middle-aged man carrying a full backpack, as captured by CCTV footage shortly before the explosion. The bomb detonated, killing the bomber and moderately injuring a 33-year-old passerby on an electric scooter with shrapnel. The explosion also set a truck on fire but caused relatively limited damage overall. The reason for the premature detonation remained unclear.

The explosion could have resulted in many more casualties had the bomb detonated in a more crowded area, sparing nearby locations such as a synagogue and a shopping center. Some sources therefore theorized that the bomb exploded prematurely, with Ynet characterizing the operation as "botched".

Four days after the bombing, Hamas revealed the identity of the bomber as Jafar Muna, a resident of Nablus. According to Israeli police, Muna "had no prior criminal record". On September 18, 2024 Hamas released a video of Muna's last statement.

== Investigation ==
By October 2024, Israel charged eight Hamas operatives with involvement in the bombing, with the operation directed by Abada Bilal, a senior Hamas operative in Turkey.

== See also ==
- Martyrdom in Palestinian culture
- Religious views on suicide § Islam
- Islamic view of death § Suicide
- History of Hamas
