= Misbah =

Muslim Arabic name

Misbah (Arabic: مصباح, romanized: Miṣbāḥ) or Musbah is a Muslim Arabic name meaning "lamp" or "light". This name has originated from The Qur'an from Ayatu-n-Nur, also known as the Ayat of light, from the following verse:

"God is the Light of the heavens and the earth. The parable of His light is, as it were, that of a niche containing a lamp; the lamp is [enclosed] in glass, the glass [shining] like a radiant star: [a lamp] lit from a blessed tree - an olive-tree that is neither of the east nor of the west the oil whereof [is so bright that it] would well-nigh give light [of itself] even though fire had not touched it: light upon light! God guides unto His light him that wills [to be guided]; and [to this end] God propounds parables unto men, since God [alone] has full knowledge of all things"

In this verse from the Qur'an, it typically means the lantern that shows the way.

== Pronunciation ==
The name Misbah is often pronounced with the "h" silent.

== As a given name ==
=== Misbah ===
- Misbah El-Ahdab (born 1962), Lebanese politician
- Misbah-ul-Haq (born 1974), Pakistani cricketer
- Misbah Khan (cricketer) (born 1986), Pakistani cricketer
- Misbah Khan (politician) (born 1989), German politician
- Misbah Rana (born 1994), Scottish child abductee
- Misbah Wajid, Pakistani politician

=== Musbah ===
- Musbah Jamli, Malaysian politician
- Musbah bint Nasser (1884–1961), queen consort of Jordan

== As a surname ==
=== Misbah ===
- Abu Taher Misbah (born 1956), Bangladeshi Islamic scholar
- Hicham Misbah (born 1977), Moroccan football player
- Musarrat Misbah (born 1959), Pakistani beautician and actress
- Norhafiz Zamani Misbah (born 1981), Malaysian football player

=== Musbah ===
- Mustafa El-Musbah, Libyan volleyball player

== See also ==
- An-Nur, the 24th surah in the Quran
- Kharbatha al-Misbah, a municipality in Ramallah and al-Bireh Governorate, Palestine
- Zouk Mosbeh, a town in Keserwan-Jbeil Governorate, Lebanon
