= As-Sawiya =

as-Sawiya
- Municipality type D (Village council)

Arabic transcription(s)
  - Arabic: الساويه
  - Latin: as-Sawiya (official) al-Sawaiya (unofficial)
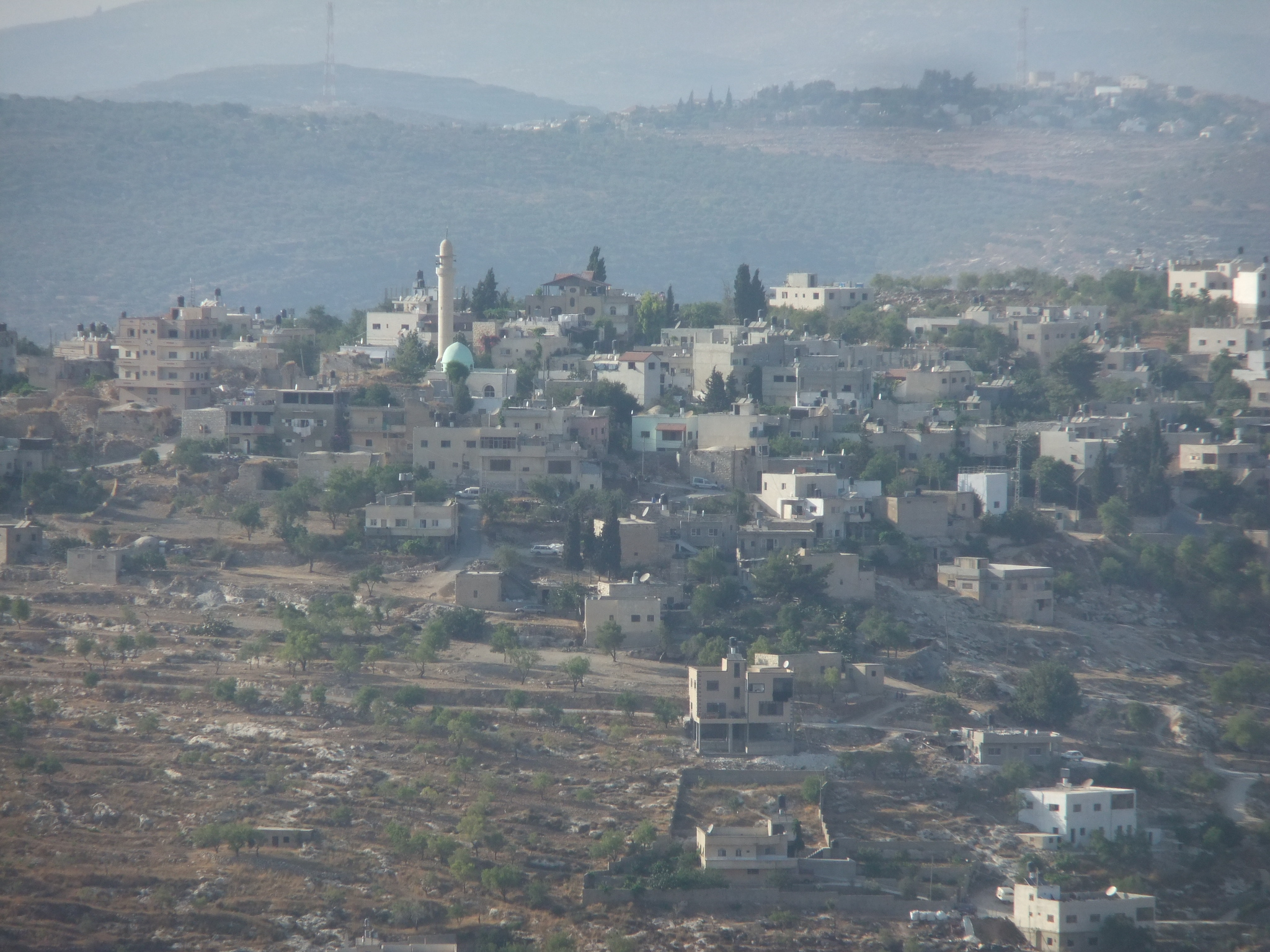
- As-Sawiya

- Location of as-Sawiya within Palestine
- Coordinates: 32°05′05″N 35°15′28″E
- Palestine grid: 174/165
- State: State of Palestine
- Governorate: Nablus

Government
  - Type: Village council (from 1994)

Population (2017)
  - Total: 2,761
- Name meaning: "The level place"

As-Sawiya (Arabic: الساويه) is a Palestinian town in the Nablus Governorate of the State of Palestine, in the northern West Bank, located 18 kilometers south of Nablus. According to the Palestinian Central Bureau of Statistics (PCBS), the town had a population of 2,761 inhabitants in 2017.

== Location ==
As-Sawiya is 15 km south of Nablus. It is bordered by Talfit and Qaryut to the east, Al-Lubban ash-Sharqiya to the south, Iskaka and Al Lubban ash Sharqiya to the west, and Yatma, Qabalan and Yasuf to the north.

== History ==
At the village site, sherds from IA II (8th and 7th century BCE), the Persian or the early Hellenistic period, Crusader era/ Ayyubid dynasty, Mamluk and early Ottoman era have been found.

In the 12th and 13th centuries, during the Crusader era, As-Sawiya was inhabited by Muslims, according to Ḍiyāʼ al-Dīn. He also noted that followers of Ibn Qudamah lived here. Syrian historian Al-Yunini mentions the village in the context of the 13th-century Mongol invasion.

=== Ottoman era ===
As-Sawiya was incorporated into the Ottoman Empire in 1517 with all of Palestine, and in 1596 it appeared in the tax registers as being in the Nahiya of Jabal Qubal of the Liwa of Nablus. It had a population of 40 households and 2 bachelors, all Muslim. They paid a fixed tax-rate of 33.3% on agricultural products, including wheat, barley, summer crops, olive trees, occasional revenues, goats and beehives; a total of 8,610 akçe. All of the revenue went to a Waqf.

In the 18th and 19th centuries the village formed part of the highland region known as Jūrat ‘Amra or Bilād Jammā‘īn. Situated between Dayr Ghassāna in the south and the present Route 5 in the north, and between Majdal Yābā in the west and Jammā‘īn, Mardā and Kifl Ḥāris in the east, this area served, according to historian Roy Marom, "as a buffer zone between the political-economic-social units of the Jerusalem and the Nablus regions. On the political level, it suffered from instability due to the migration of the Bedouin tribes and the constant competition among local clans for the right to collect taxes on behalf of the Ottoman authorities."

In 1838 Robinson noted As-Sawiya being situated on a hill, located in the Jurat Merda district, south of Nablus.

In 1870 Victor Guérin found that it had three hundred inhabitants, and that the villagers had a mosque.

In 1870/1871 (1288 AH), an Ottoman census listed the village in the nahiya (sub-district) of Jamma'in al-Thani, subordinate to Nablus.

In 1882, the PEF's Survey of Western Palestine described Sawiya as "a little village on a hill overhanging the road."

=== British Mandate era ===
In the 1922 census of Palestine conducted by the British Mandate authorities, As-Sawiya (called: Sawiyeh) had a population of 476, all Muslims, while in the 1931 census it had 128 occupied houses and a population of 596, again all Muslim.

In the 1945 statistics Es Sawiya had a population of 820, all Muslims, with 10,787 dunams of land, according to an official land and population survey. Of this, 4,394 dunams were plantations and irrigable land, 3,412 used for cereals, while 40 dunams were built-up (urban) land.

=== Jordanian era ===
In the wake of the 1948 Arab–Israeli War and after the 1949 Armistice Agreements, As-Sawiya came under Jordanian rule.

The Jordanian census of 1961 found 1,151 inhabitants.

=== post-1967 ===
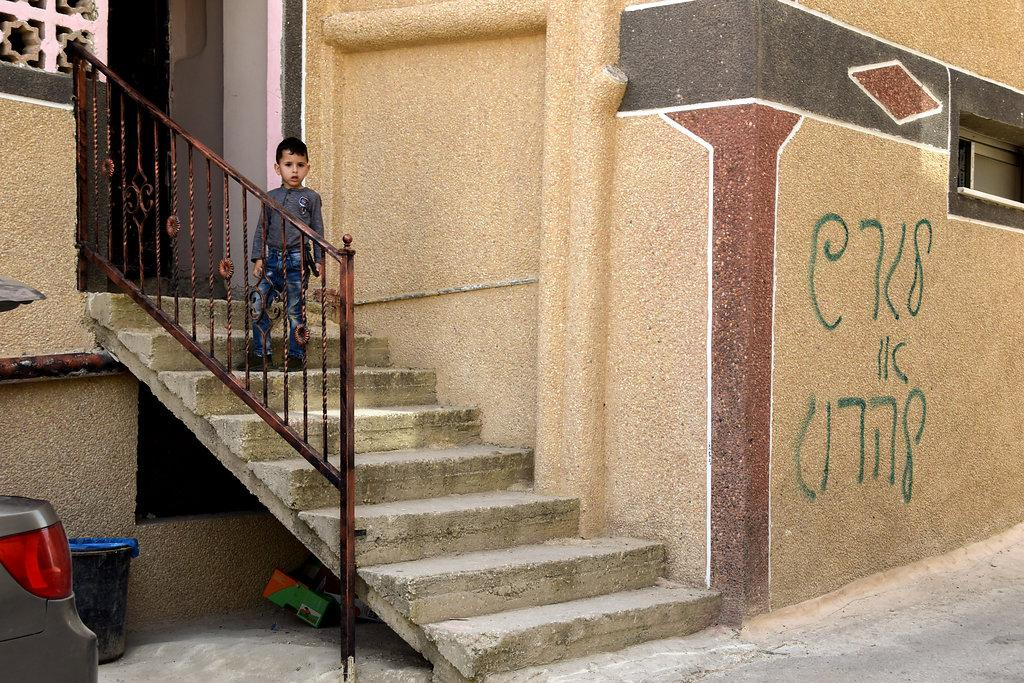
"Kill or deport." Graffiti spray-painted in Hebrew by Israeli settlers on the wall of a home in As-Sawiya, 2018

Since the Six-Day War in 1967, As-Sawiya has been under Israeli occupation.

After the 1995 accords, approximately 14% of villageland was classified as Area B, the remaining 86% as Area C. Israel has confiscated 1,551 dunums of village land for the Israeli settlement of Alie, and 376 dunams for Rechalim.

As-Sawiya is entirely dependent on its agricultural land. Prior to the start of the Second Intifada in 2000, about 250 of the village's residents worked in Israel, but by 2004, only three continued working there.

The primary crops grown in as-Sawiya are wheat, olives, grapes, figs, and beans. The land is also used for grazing livestock. Some residents produce yoghurt from their cows and sell it. Local residents sell olive oil to nearby villages such as Lubban as well. Stone-cutting is the most important industry in the town after agriculture.

=== Israeli settler violence ===
According to locals, village life has been "deeply affected" by harassment from Jewish settlers. "People cannot go and harvest their land. The settlers take our olives, they throw rocks at people." According to Yesh Din: "settlers of Eli [..] have taken possession of a number of hills around the original settlement nucleus, have seriously impaired the ability of Palestinians from the nearby villages of Qaryut, Luban al-Sharqiyah and Al-Sawiyah to reach thousands of dunams that they own and depend on for their livelihoods. Even where they still have some minimal access (usually for two or three days a year, during the olive harvest), their produce is damaged and farmers are physically attacked and are simply unable to tend to their crops properly." It has been reported that "settlers painted a star of David and slogans such as "Death to Arabs" on the village mosque and in 2011 3 were injured as settlers opened fire on the village. and setting fire to a girls school in the village and scrawling a Hebrew message on a nearby wall: “Greetings from the hilltops.”

== Khan as-Sawiya (Khirbet Berkit) ==
Just north-east of the village researchers described the ruins of a khan (caravanserai), at a site known as Khan as-Sawieh or Khirbet Berkit. Byzantine pottery, old tombs and cisterns have been found in the Khan as-Sawieh area. Denys Pringle lists the khan among the Crusader remains in Palestine. In 1838 Robinson found the khan in ruins, and so did de Saulcy in 1850. In the 1882 the PEF's Survey of Western Palestine (SWP) described it as "a small square building, also a ruined Khan; the walls are standing to some height, and drafted stones are used at the corners. Rock-cut tombs exist just south, showing the place to be an ancient site. The name of the site is Khurbet Berkit."

Khirbet Berkit has been described by Charles William Wilson (1836–1905) as likely being identical with first-century CE Borceos, and a nearby ruin called ’Aina with Anuath; Anuath and Borceos are the border town or towns mentioned by Josephus as standing at the border between Samaria and Judea.

Near the spring by the khan, Wilson describes a large oak-tree, ballut in Arabic, of a size very seldom found in what he terms as Southern Palestine.

== Bibliography ==
- Barron, J.B., ed. (1923). Palestine: Report and General Abstracts of the Census of 1922. Government of Palestine.
- Conder, C.R.; Kitchener, H.H. (1882). The Survey of Western Palestine: Memoirs of the Topography, Orography, Hydrography, and Archaeology. Vol. 2. London: Committee of the Palestine Exploration Fund.
- Dauphin, C. (1998). La Palestine byzantine, Peuplement et Populations. BAR International Series 726 (in French). Vol. III : Catalogue. Oxford: Archeopress. ISBN 0-860549-05-4.
- Drory, Joseph (1988). "Hanbalis of the Nablus Region in the Eleventh and Twelfth Centuries". Asian and African Studies. 22: 93–112.
- Ellenblum, R. (2003). Frankish Rural Settlement in the Latin Kingdom of Jerusalem. Cambridge University Press. ISBN 9780521521871.
- Finkelstein, I.; Lederman, Zvi, eds. (1997). Highlands of many cultures. Tel Aviv: Institute of Archaeology of Tel Aviv University Publications Section. ISBN 965-440-007-3.
- Government of Jordan, Department of Statistics (1964). First Census of Population and Housing. Volume I: Final Tables; General Characteristics of the Population (PDF).
- Government of Palestine, Department of Statistics (1945). Village Statistics, April, 1945.
- Guérin, V. (1875). Description Géographique Historique et Archéologique de la Palestine (in French). Vol. 2: Samarie, pt. 2. Paris: L'Imprimerie Nationale.
- Hadawi, S. (1970). Village Statistics of 1945: A Classification of Land and Area ownership in Palestine. Palestine Liberation Organization Research Center.
- Hütteroth, W.-D.; Abdulfattah, K. (1977). Historical Geography of Palestine, Transjordan and Southern Syria in the Late 16th Century. Erlanger Geographische Arbeiten, Sonderband 5. Erlangen, Germany: Vorstand der Fränkischen Geographischen Gesellschaft. ISBN 3-920405-41-2.
- Mills, E., ed. (1932). Census of Palestine 1931. Population of Villages, Towns and Administrative Areas. Jerusalem: Government of Palestine.
- Palmer, E.H. (1881). The Survey of Western Palestine: Arabic and English Name Lists Collected During the Survey by Lieutenants Conder and Kitchener, R. E. Transliterated and Explained by E.H. Palmer. Committee of the Palestine Exploration Fund.
- Pringle, D. (1997). Secular buildings in the Crusader Kingdom of Jerusalem: an archaeological Gazetter. Cambridge University Press. ISBN 0521-46010-7.
- Robinson, E.; Smith, E. (1841). Biblical Researches in Palestine, Mount Sinai and Arabia Petraea: A Journal of Travels in the year 1838. Vol. 2. Boston: Crocker & Brewster.
- Robinson, E.; Smith, E. (1841). Biblical Researches in Palestine, Mount Sinai and Arabia Petraea: A Journal of Travels in the year 1838. Vol. 3. Boston: Crocker & Brewster.
- Saulcy, L.F. de (1854). Narrative of a journey round the Dead Sea, and in the Bible lands, in 1850 and 1851. Vol. 1, new edition. London: R. Bentley.
- Talmon-Heller, Daniella (1994). "Popular Hanbalite Islam in 12th–13th Century Jabal Nablus and Jabal Qasyūn". Studia Islamica. 79: 103–120. doi:10.2307/1595838. JSTOR 1595838.
- Wilson, C.W. (1881). Picturesque Palestine, Sinai and Egypt. Vol. 1. New York: D. Appleton.
