= Al-Lubban ash-Sharqiya =

- Municipality type C

Arabic transcription(s)
  - Arabic: اللبّن الشرقية
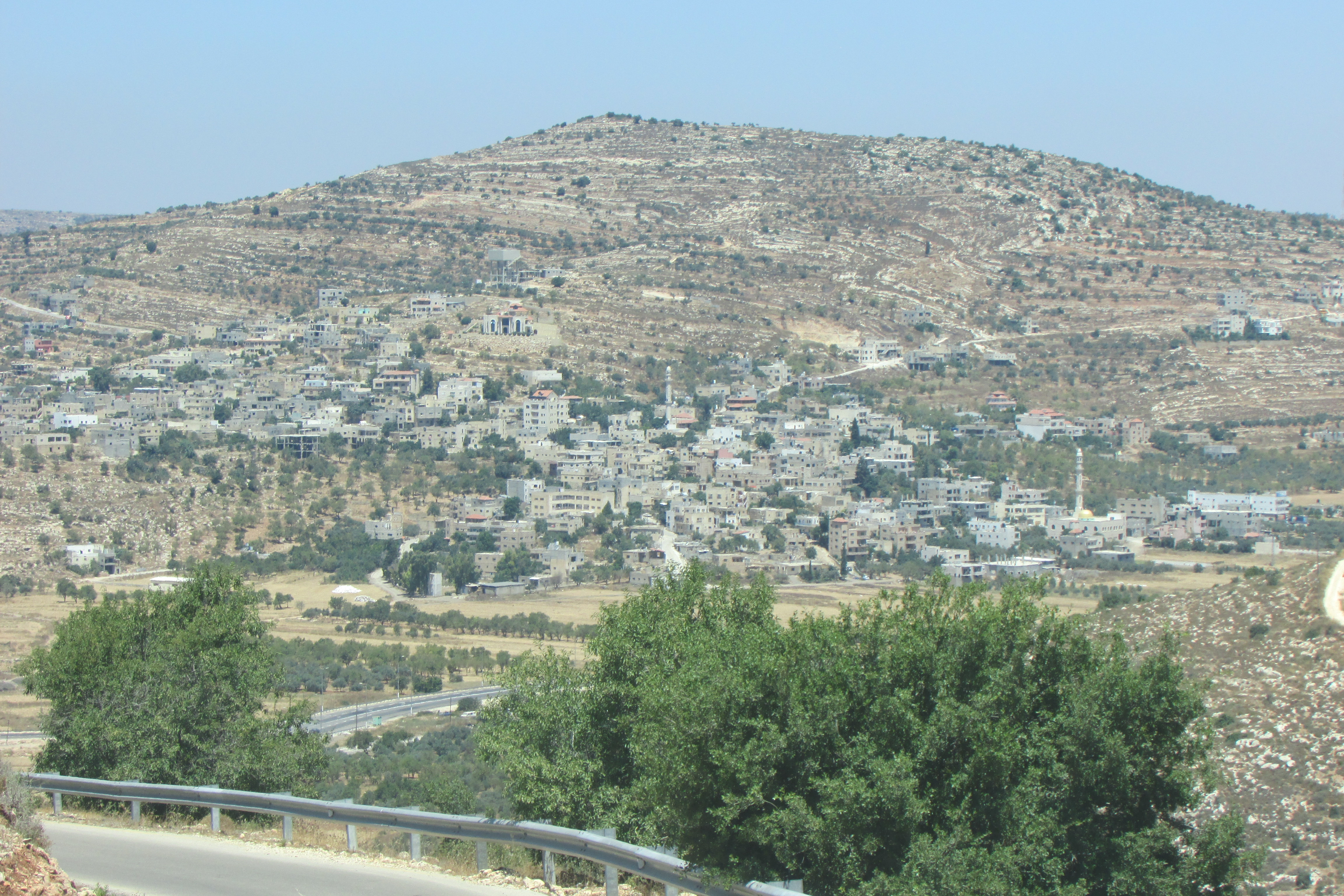

- Location of Al-Lubban ash-Sharqiya within the State of Palestine
- Coordinates: 32°04′16″N 35°14′28″E
- Palestine grid: 175/160
- State: State of Palestine
- Governorate: Nablus Governorate

Government
  - Type: Municipality
- Elevation: 586 m (1,923 ft)

Population (2017)
  - Total: 2,640
- Name meaning: White or Frankincense

Al-Lubban ash-Sharqiya (Arabic: اللبّن الشرقية) is a Palestinian village in the northern West Bank, 20 kilometers south of Nablus, in the Nablus Governorate of the State of Palestine. The town has a total land area of 12,075 dunams of which 200 dunams is built-up area. The village is just north of the historic Khan al-Lubban caravansary.

In 2012, the nearby village of Ammuriya was joined with Al-Lubban ash-Sharqiya into one Municipal Council, also called Al-Lubban ash-Sharqiya.

== Location ==
Al-Lubban ash-Sharqiya is bordered by Qaryut and As Sawiya to the east, As Sawiya, Iskaka and Salfit to the north, Khirbet Qeis to the west, and 'Abwein and Sinjil to the south.

== History ==
=== Iron Age through Abbasid period ===
Al-Lubban ash-Sharqiya has been identified with biblical Lebonah.

Pottery and sherds from Iron Age II, Hellenistic, Hellenistic/Roman and Byzantine period have been found, as have sherds from the Umayyad/ Abbasid periods.

=== Crusaders, Ayyubids, and Mamluks ===
The village was known as "Lubanum" to the Crusaders, and sherds from the Crusader/Ayyubid period have also been found there.

Muhammad ibn Abd al-Wahid al-Makhzumi al-Lubanni (d. 1260), a qadi (Islamic judge) in Baalbek, was born in the village in AH 593/1196 CE. In the 1320s, it was marked as Casale Lepna on the map of Marino Sanuto.

Sherds from the Mamluk period have also been found there.

=== Ottoman period ===
In 1517, the village was incorporated into the Ottoman Empire with the rest of Palestine. Under the name "Lubban as-Sawi", the village appeared in the 1596 Ottoman tax registers as being in the Nahiya of Jabal Qubal of the liwa of Nablus. It had a population of 75 Muslim households. They paid a fixed tax-rate of 33.3% on agricultural products, including wheat, barley, summer crops, olives, and goats or beehives; a total of 15,454 akçe. Half of the revenue went to a Waqf.

In the 18th and 19th centuries, the village formed part of the highland region known as Jūrat ‘Amra or Bilād Jammā‘īn. Situated between Dayr Ghassāna in the south and the present Route 5 in the north, and between Majdal Yābā in the west and Jammā‘īn, Mardā and Kifl Ḥāris in the east, this area served, according to historian Roy Marom, "as a buffer zone between the political-economic-social units of the Jerusalem and the Nablus regions. On the political level, it suffered from instability due to the migration of the Bedouin tribes and the constant competition among local clans for the right to collect taxes on behalf of the Ottoman authorities."

In 1838, it was noted as el-Lubban, a village in the Jurat Merda district, south of Nablus. It was also noted that it was inhabited, having the appearance of an old place, with rock cut tombs above it. French explorer Victor Guérin visited the village in 1863, and found it to be in a poor state, but with beautiful old elements as part of the houses. The population was estimated to be 300.

In 1870/1871 (AH 1288), an Ottoman census listed the village in the nahiya (sub-district) of Jamma'in al-Thani, subordinate to Nablus. In the 1882 PEF's Survey of Western Palestine (SWP), the village was described as being perched on a terrace on the hill, with ancient tombs close by.

=== British Mandate ===
In the 1922 census of Palestine, conducted by the British Mandate authorities, Al-Lubban ash-Sharqiya (called Lubban Sharqi) had a population of 356, all Muslims, increasing in the 1931 census to a population of 474 Muslims and one Christian, in a total of 116 houses.

In the 1945 statistics Lubban Sharqiya had a population of 620, all Muslims, with 12,545 dunams of land, according to an official land and population survey. Of this, 2,424 dunams were plantations and irrigable land, 5,605 used for cereals, while 34 dunams were built-up land.

=== Jordanian period ===
In the wake of the 1948 Arab–Israeli War, and after the 1949 Armistice Agreements, Al-Lubban ash-Sharqiya came under Jordanian rule. It was annexed by Jordan in 1950.

In 1961 the population of Lubban Sharqiye was 984.

=== 1967 war to Oslo Accords ===
Since the Six-Day War in 1967, Al-Lubban ash-Sharqiya has been under Israeli occupation. The population of Lubben Sharqiya in the 1967 census conducted by Israel was 823, of whom 37 originated from the Israeli territory.

=== Since Oslo Accords ===
Under the Oslo Accords of 1995, 33% of village land was classified as Area A (full Palestinian control), 25% as Area B (partial Palestinian control), and the remaining 40% as Area C (full Israeli control). Israel has confiscated 1,144 dunums of land from Al Lubban ash Sharqiya for the establishment of the Israeli settlements of Alie and Ma’ale Levona, and additional land for service roads.

On 5 November 1990 at Al-Lubban ash-Sharqiya, a local villager, Ali el Khatib, aged 65 was gunned down while riding his donkey to an olive grove, and a few second later, gunfire from the same Israeli Peugeot killed Miriam Salman Rashid while she was standing outside her home. The car then sped off towards Eli. On the basis of evidence collected in an intensive investigation, police concluded that it was an operation undertaken by members of the Kach militant organization in retaliation for Meir Kahane's murder in New York earlier that day. Three Kach activists, among them David Ha'ivri, were arrested on suspicion, but the case never came to trial due to lack of evidence.

According to the Palestinian Central Bureau of Statistics (PCBS), al-Lubban ash-Sharqiya had a population of 2,465 in the 2007 census and 2,640 by 2017. The population is primarily made up of two clans, the Daraghmeh and Awaysa.

In 2009 two members of Yesh Din wrote in Haaretz about settlers from Eli who had taken control over land in the area, which had seriously damaged the ability of the villagers from Al-Lubban ash-Sharqiya to work their land. According to the writers, this was part of a systematic strategy to remove all Palestinians from Area C, and the authors concluded that "an infrastructure of Jewish terror is being created in the West Bank."

On 4 May 2010 a fire broke out in the main mosque of al-Lubban al-Sharqiyya, destroying carpets and religious texts. Police forensics officers were called in to determine whether it was arson or an electrical failure, while the PA said the fire was started by settlers in a price tag attack. Israel firefighters later said the fire seemed to was deliberately set, and that the likely cause was arson. Later the same year, the olive harvest became one of the most violent for years on the West Bank, and olive trees belonging to the village, and situated near the Israeli settlement of Eli, were torched, though Eli residents say it was a "pruning fire that got out of control." The family of Rasmia Awase found 40 olive trees they had planted two decades earlier on their plot near the settlement of Eli chopped down when they came to harvest the fruits. They blamed the destruction on Eli settlers.

In February 2012 an IDF soldier from the Golani Brigade, together with two women were arrested for defacing a village home with graffiti "Mohammed is a Pig". Security cameras in the village showed one of them destroying construction material.

In March 2012 the UN published a report about the take-over by Israeli settlers of water resources on the West Bank, including the spring Ein El Mukheimer near al-Lubban al-Sharqiyya, traditionally used by villagers for irrigation and domestic purposes.

According to the village head of Al-Lubban ash-Sharqiya, the villagers were only allowed near another local spring, Ain Arik, for a few days of the year during harvest time. The rest of the year they would be stopped by the Israeli military.

One family, the Daraghmehs, have repeatedly complained of harassment from Israeli settlers, saying that both animals and crops have been destroyed. In response, both local and international supporters have come to their aid.

== Khan al-Lubban ==
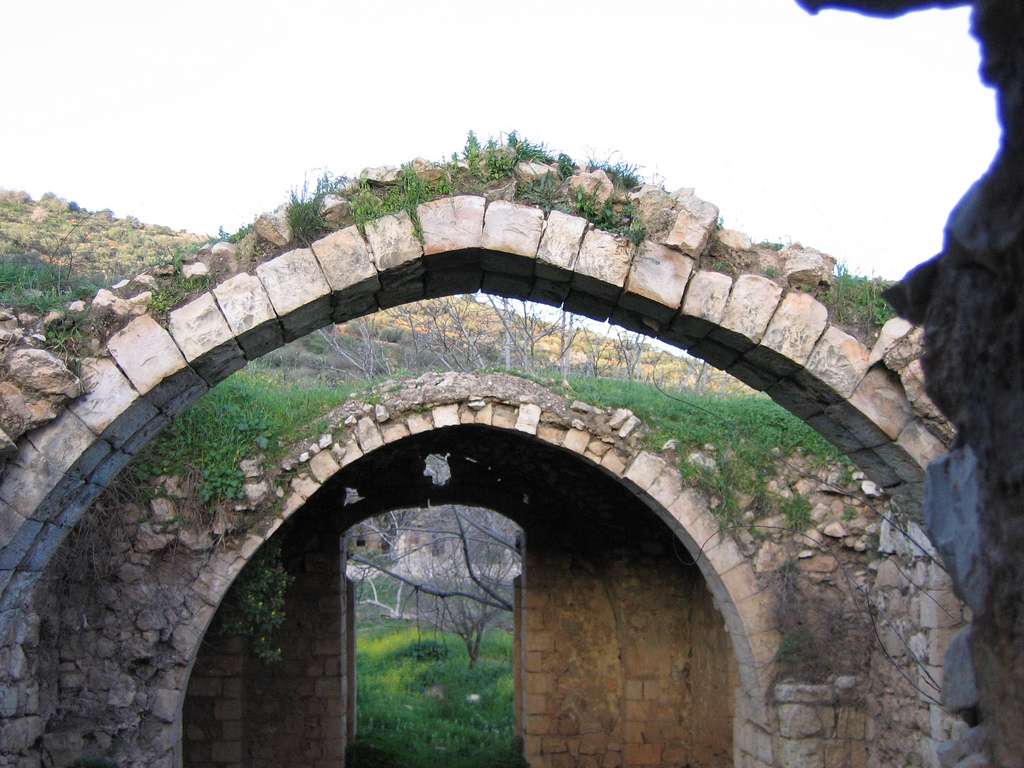
Arches of Khan al-Lubban

Between al-Lubban ash-Sharqiya and Sinjil is the Khan al-Lubban caravansary. The exact date of its construction is not clear, although its architectural style indicates it was built during the Mamluk or early Ottoman eras. Large parts of its western and northern sides were restored and reconstructed in the later Ottoman period as indicated by the size and style of the stones. Factors behind its construction include its important location as a crossroads between central Palestine's major towns and the close proximity of a freshwater well.

In the spring of 1697, Henry Maundrell stayed at the Khan first on the way south to Jerusalem, and then on the way back. Maundrell was also the first person to identify the place as "Lebonah" (Judges 21:19).

In 1838 Edward Robinson found the Khan "in ruins", but noted near it a "fine fountain of running water", the same was found by de Saulcy in 1850. In 1882, the Khan was also described as "ruined", but with a fine spring beneath it.

During the British Mandate period, the authorities took advantage of its strategic position and used Khan al-Lubban as a police station. The Jordanians continued to use the complex for the same purpose following the 1948 Arab-Israeli War. Presently, the site is open to the public and recent work has been carried out to accommodate more visitors.

Because of its proximity to the larger caravansary towns of Nablus and al-Bireh, Khan al-Lubban only consists of a single story, unlike most caravansaries which have two or more. The layout of Khan al-Lubban is square-shaped, with each side measuring roughly 23 meters in length. Most of the original building remains intact, with the entrance way bordered by stables on both sides and leading into a courtyard. The eastern and western rooms served administrative functions while the northern rooms served as visitor lodging.

== Demography ==
Some residents of Lubban have their origins in al-Walaja.

== See also ==
- al-Lubban al-Gharbi
- List of Israeli price tag attacks

== Bibliography ==
- Barron, J.B., ed. (1923). Palestine: Report and General Abstracts of the Census of 1922. Government of Palestine.
- Conder, C.R.; Kitchener, H.H. (1882). The Survey of Western Palestine: Memoirs of the Topography, Orography, Hydrography, and Archaeology. Vol. 2. London: Committee of the Palestine Exploration Fund.
- Dauphin, C. (1998). La Palestine byzantine, Peuplement et Populations. BAR International Series 726 (in French). Vol. III : Catalogue. Oxford: Archeopress. ISBN 0-860549-05-4.
- Ellenblum, R. (2003). Frankish Rural Settlement in the Latin Kingdom of Jerusalem. Cambridge University Press. ISBN 9780521521871.
- Finkelstein, I.; Lederman, Zvi, eds. (1997). Highlands of many cultures. Tel Aviv: Institute of Archaeology of Tel Aviv University Publications Section. ISBN 965-440-007-3.
- Government of Jordan, Department of Statistics (1964). First Census of Population and Housing. Volume I: Final Tables; General Characteristics of the Population (PDF).
- Government of Palestine, Department of Statistics (1945). Village Statistics, April, 1945.
- Guérin, V. (1875). Description Géographique Historique et Archéologique de la Palestine (in French). Vol. 2: Samarie, pt. 2. Paris: L'Imprimerie Nationale.
- Hadawi, S. (1970). Village Statistics of 1945: A Classification of Land and Area ownership in Palestine. Palestine Liberation Organization Research Centre. Archived from the original on 2018-12-08.
- Hütteroth, W.-D.; Abdulfattah, K. (1977). Historical Geography of Palestine, Transjordan and Southern Syria in the Late 16th Century. Erlanger Geographische Arbeiten, Sonderband 5. Erlangen, Germany: Vorstand der Fränkischen Geographischen Gesellschaft. ISBN 3-920405-41-2.
- Maundrell, H. (1703). A Journey from Aleppo to Jerusalem: At Easter, A. D. 1697. Oxford: Printed at the Theatre.
- Mills, E., ed. (1932). Census of Palestine 1931. Population of Villages, Towns and Administrative Areas. Jerusalem: Government of Palestine.
- Palmer, E.H. (1881). The Survey of Western Palestine: Arabic and English Name Lists Collected During the Survey by Lieutenants Conder and Kitchener, R. E. Transliterated and Explained by E.H. Palmer. Committee of the Palestine Exploration Fund.
- Pedahzur, Ami; Perliger, Arie (2011). Jewish Terrorism in Israel. London: Columbia University Press. ISBN 978-0231154475.
- Pringle, D. (1997). Secular buildings in the Crusader Kingdom of Jerusalem: an archaeological Gazetter. Cambridge University Press. ISBN 0521-46010-7.
- Pringle, D. (1998). The Churches of the Crusader Kingdom of Jerusalem: L-Z (excluding Tyre). Cambridge University Press. ISBN 0521390370.
- Robinson, E.; Smith, E. (1841). Biblical Researches in Palestine, Mount Sinai and Arabia Petraea: A Journal of Travels in the year 1838. Vol. 2. Boston: Crocker & Brewster.
- Robinson, E.; Smith, E. (1841). Biblical Researches in Palestine, Mount Sinai and Arabia Petraea: A Journal of Travels in the year 1838. Vol. 3. Boston: Crocker & Brewster.
- Röhricht, R. (1893). (RRH) Regesta regni Hierosolymitani (MXCVII-MCCXCI) (in Latin). Berlin: Libraria Academica Wageriana.
- Saulcy, L.F. de (1854). Narrative of a journey round the Dead Sea, and in the Bible lands, in 1850 and 1851. Vol. 1, new edition. London: R. Bentley.
