= Ammuriya, Nablus =

Ammuriya
- Local Development Committee

Arabic transcription(s)
  - Arabic: عمورية
  - Latin: ʽAmuria (official) ʽAmuriya (unofficial)
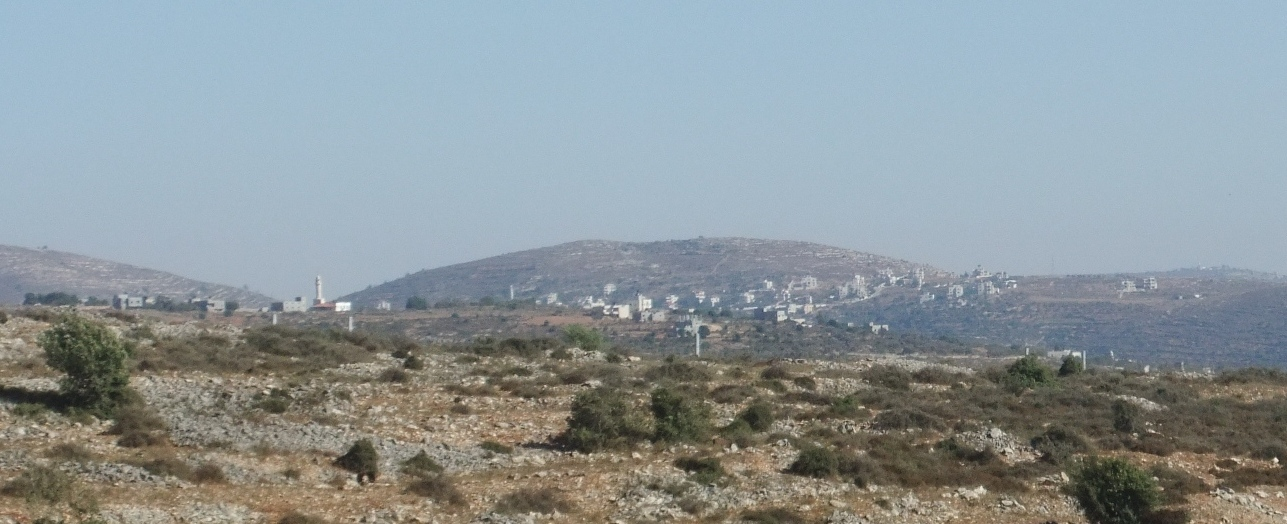
- Jilijliya to the right, ʽAmmuriya to the left.

- Location of ʽAmmuriya within Palestine
- Coordinates: 32°3′51″N 35°12′41″E
- Palestine grid: 169/163
- State: State of Palestine
- Governorate: Nablus

Government
  - Type: Local Development Committee
  - Head of Municipality: Sulaiman Hakawati

Population (2017)
  - Total: 371

Ammuriya (Arabic: عمورية, romanized: ʿAmmūriya, also spelled Amuria) is a Palestinian village in the Nablus Governorate of the State of Palestine in the northern West Bank, located south of Nablus. According to the Palestinian Central Bureau of Statistics (PCBS) census, Ammuriya had a population of 371 in 2017. There were 48 households and five business establishments in the village.

In 2012, Ammuriya was joined with al-Lubban ash-Sharqiya into a single municipality called after the latter town.

== Location ==
Nearby localities include Iskaka to the north, al-Lubban ash-Sharqiya to the east, Abwein to the south, Arura and Mazari an-Nubani to the southwest and Salfit to the northwest.

== History ==
Pottery sherds from Iron Age II, Hellenistic/Roman, Crusader/Ayyubid and Mamluk eras have been found here. A burial cave dating back to the Roman period was found here.

=== Ottoman era ===
In 1596, it appeared in Ottoman tax registers as "ʽAmmuriya", a village in the nahiya of Jabal Qubal in the Nablus Sanjak. It had a population of 7 households and 1 bachelor, all Muslim. The villagers paid taxes on wheat, barley, summer crops, olive trees, goats and beehives, and a press for olive oils or grapes; a total of 2,000 akçe.

In the 18th and 19th centuries, the village formed part of the highland region known as Jūrat ‘Amra or Bilād Jammā‘īn. Situated between Dayr Ghassāna in the south and the present Route 5 in the north, and between Majdal Yābā in the west and Jammā‘īn, Mardā and Kifl Ḥāris in the east, this area served, according to historian Roy Marom, "as a buffer zone between the political-economic-social units of the Jerusalem and the Nablus regions. On the political level, it suffered from instability due to the migration of the Bedouin tribes and the constant competition among local clans for the right to collect taxes on behalf of the Ottoman authorities."

In 1838, Edward Robinson noted it as a village in the Jurat Merda district, south of Nablus.

In 1870/1871 (1288 AH), an Ottoman census listed the village in the nahiya (sub-district) of Jamma'in al-Thani, subordinate to Nablus.

In 1882, the PEF's Survey of Western Palestine (SWP) described it as "A small village on high ground".

=== British Mandate era ===
In the 1922 census of Palestine, conducted by the British Mandate authorities, the population was 69, all Muslim, increasing in the 1931 census 85 Muslims in 19 houses.

In the 1945 statistics the population was 120, all Muslims, with 3,112 dunams of land, according to an official land and population survey. Of this, 1,753 dunams were used for cereals, while 6 dunams were built-up land.

=== Jordanian era ===
In the wake of the 1948 Arab–Israeli War, and after the 1949 Armistice Agreements, ʽAmmuriya came under Jordanian rule.

The Jordanian census of 1961 found 157 inhabitants.

=== 1967, and aftermath ===
In 1967 the village came under Israeli occupation after the Six-Day War, and the same year the population was found to be 130.

In 1997, it was described as "a very small village surrounded by orchards".

In 2012, Ammuriya was joined with al-Lubban ash-Sharqiya in a single municipality called after the latter town.

== Demography ==
The people of Ammuriya have their origins in the area of Jerusalem.

== Bibliography ==
- Barron, J.B., ed. (1923). Palestine: Report and General Abstracts of the Census of 1922. Government of Palestine.
- Conder, C.R.; Kitchener, H.H. (1882). The Survey of Western Palestine: Memoirs of the Topography, Orography, Hydrography, and Archaeology. Vol. 2. London: Committee of the Palestine Exploration Fund.
- Finkelstein, I.; Lederman, Zvi, eds. (1997). Highlands of many cultures. Tel Aviv: Institute of Archaeology of Tel Aviv University Publications Section. ISBN 965-440-007-3.
- Government of Jordan, Department of Statistics (1964). First Census of Population and Housing. Volume I: Final Tables; General Characteristics of the Population (PDF).
- Government of Palestine, Department of Statistics (1945). Village Statistics, April, 1945.
- Hadawi, S. (1970). Village Statistics of 1945: A Classification of Land and Area ownership in Palestine. Palestine Liberation Organization Research Center. Archived from the original on 2018-12-08.
- Hütteroth, W.-D.; Abdulfattah, K. (1977). Historical Geography of Palestine, Transjordan and Southern Syria in the Late 16th Century. Erlanger Geographische Arbeiten, Sonderband 5. Erlangen, Germany: Vorstand der Fränkischen Geographischen Gesellschaft. ISBN 3-920405-41-2.
- Mills, E., ed. (1932). Census of Palestine 1931. Population of Villages, Towns and Administrative Areas. Jerusalem: Government of Palestine.
- Palmer, E.H. (1881). The Survey of Western Palestine: Arabic and English Name Lists Collected During the Survey by Lieutenants Conder and Kitchener, R. E. Transliterated and Explained by E.H. Palmer. Committee of the Palestine Exploration Fund.
- Perlmann, Joel: The 1967 Census of the West Bank and Gaza Strip: A Digitized Version. Annandale-on-Hudson, N.Y.: Levy Economics Institute of Bard College. November 2011 – February 2012. [Digitized from: Israel Central Bureau of Statistics, Census of Population and Housing, 1967 Conducted in the Areas Administered by the IDF, Vols. 1–5 (1967–70), and Census of Population and Housing: East Jerusalem, Parts 1 and 2 (1968–70).]
- Robinson, E.; Smith, E. (1841). Biblical Researches in Palestine, Mount Sinai and Arabia Petraea: A Journal of Travels in the year 1838. Vol. 3. Boston: Crocker & Brewster.
