= Yasuf =

- Municipality type D (Village council)

Arabic transcription(s)
  - Arabic: ياسوف
  - Latin: Yassuf (official); Yasouf (unofficial)
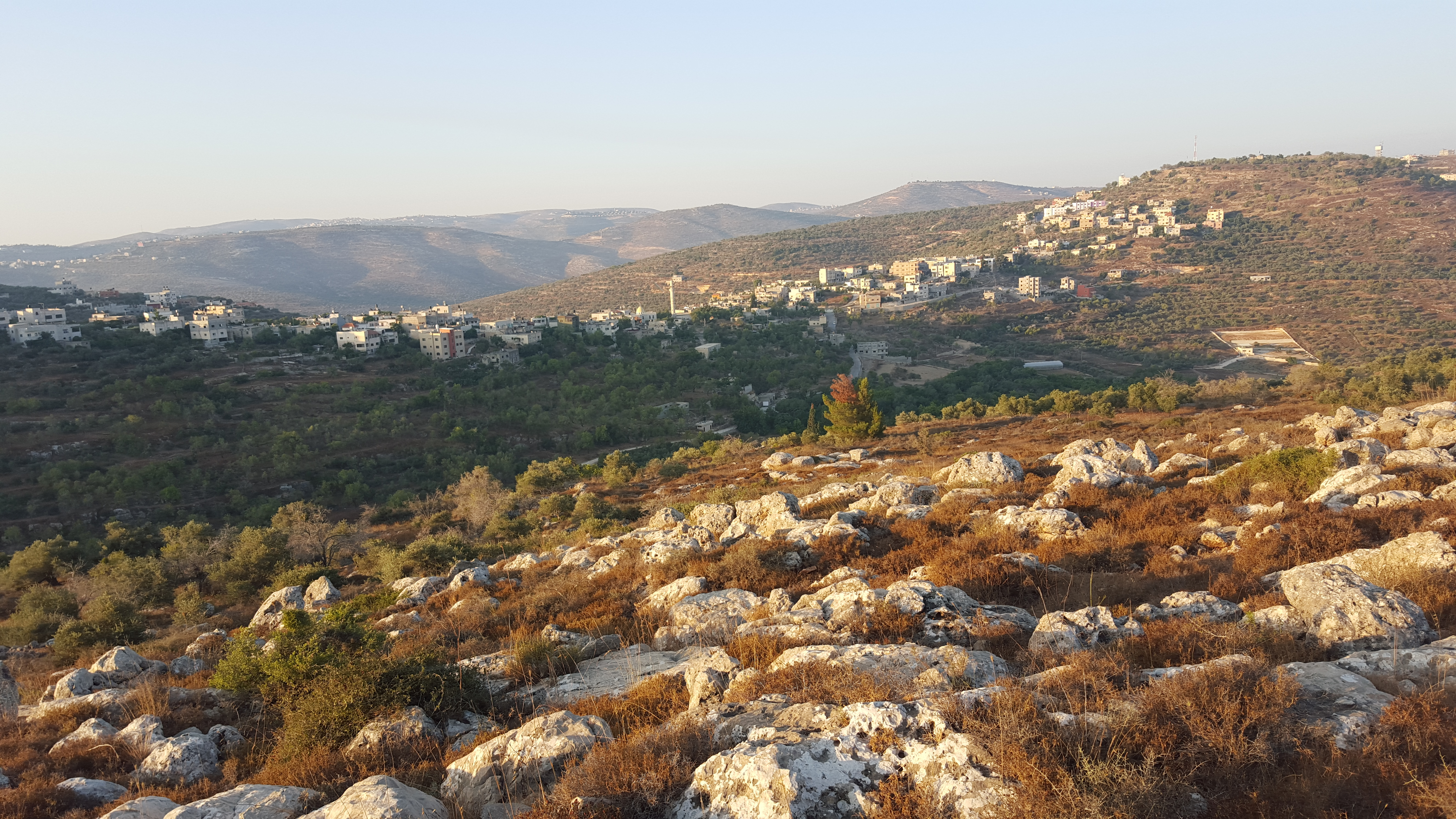

- Location of Yasuf within Palestine
- Coordinates: 32°06′32″N 35°14′20″E
- Palestine grid: 172/168
- State: State of Palestine
- Governorate: Salfit

Government
  - Type: Village council

Area
  - Total: 8.6 km^{2} (3.3 sq mi)
- Elevation: 575 m (1,886 ft)

Population (2017)
  - Total: 2,093
  - Density: 240/km^{2} (630/sq mi)
- Name meaning: from personal name

Yasuf (Arabic: ياسوف) is a Palestinian village in the Salfit Governorate of the State of Palestine, in the northern West Bank, northeast of Salfit, 37 kilometres (23 mi) southwest of Nablus and adjacent to the Israeli settlement of Kfar Tapuach. According to the Palestinian Central Bureau of Statistics, it had a population of 2,093 in 2017. About 87% of the population relies on agriculture for income, while the remainder work in the public sector.

== Location ==
Yasuf is 6 kilometers (3.7 mi) north-east of Salfit. It is bordered by Yatma and Za'tara to the east, As-Sawiya to the east and south, Iskaka to the south and west, Jamma'in to the west and north, and Huwwara to the north.

== History ==
Yasuf is an ancient village that is known from all periods. Potsherds from the Iron Age II (8th and 7th centuries BCE), have been found, and also from the Hellenistic/Roman, Crusader/Ayyubid, Mamluk and early Ottoman era. Byzantine ceramics have also been found.

NE and SW of the village is a large cemetery, with tombs carved into rock, some with arcosolia.

=== Iron age ===
Yasuf is identified with the Israelite village of Yashuv (ישב) mentioned in the Samaria Ostraca.

=== Classical antiquity ===
During the Roman period it was one of three important markets for fruits, grains and legumes in the northern Judean mountains, southern Samaria, and the region of Lod.

The village is mentioned by its current name in the Samaritan Book of Joshua, and in the "Samaritan Chronicle", its name is recorded as Jusepheh. According to the former, a story recounts how two Samaritan brothers, Ephraim and Menashe of Yasuf, hosted a Jewish pilgrim for the night and swapped the doves the pilgrim intended to offer as a sacrifice in the Temple of Jerusalem with mice. When their actions were discovered, they were punished and forced into servitude in the Temple.

The Samaritan Tolidah preserves a tradition that the wife of the Roman emperor Hadrian was a Samaritan from Yasuf. Therefore, after his conquest of Jerusalem, Hadrian placed a copper tablet in Nablus declaring that no Jew was permitted to reside there.

In a Samaritan text, the town was known to have been inhabited by Samaritan High Priests.

=== Middle ages ===
During the Crusader period Diya' al-Din (1173–1245) writes that there was a rural mosque in Yasuf, indicating that there was a significant Muslim population in the village at the time. He also noted that followers of Ibn Qudamah lived here.

Yakut (1179–1229) noted that Yasuf was a "village of Nabulus in the Filastin province. It is celebrated for its abundance of pomegranates."

=== Ottoman period ===
The village was incorporated into the Ottoman Empire in 1517 with all of Palestine, and in 1596 it appeared in the tax registers under the name of Yasuf ar-Rumman. It was in the Nahiya of Jabal Qubal of the Liwa of Nablus, with a population of 41 households and 8 bachelors, all Muslim. The villagers paid taxes on wheat, barley, summer crops, olives, goats and beehives; a total of 6,700 akçe. 1,5/24 of the revenue went to a Waqf.

In the 18th and 19th centuries the village formed part of the highland region known as Jūrat ‘Amra or Bilād Jammā‘īn. Situated between Dayr Ghassāna in the south and the present Route 5 in the north, and between Majdal Yābā in the west and Jammā‘īn, Mardā and Kifl Ḥāris in the east, this area served, according to historian Roy Marom, "as a buffer zone between the political-economic-social units of the Jerusalem and the Nablus regions. On the political level, it suffered from instability due to the migration of the Bedouin tribes and the constant competition among local clans for the right to collect taxes on behalf of the Ottoman authorities."

French explorer Victor Guérin visited the village in 1870, and he found it to have about 350 inhabitants. The village appeared ancient, with old masonry reused in houses and walls. The village had an excellent supply of water which was collected in a pool, near the steps down was a beautifully carved niche with a shell motif. This pool provided water for gardens of olive and pomegranate trees.

In 1870/1871 (1288 AH) an Ottoman census listed the village in the nahiya (sub-district) of Jamma'in al-Thani, subordinate to Nablus.

In the 1882 PEF's Survey of Western Palestine (SWP), Yasuf is described as, "an ancient village," located in a valley, with a Roman road passing nearby. Inside the village is "a good spring ... and olives. A beautiful garden of pomegranates exists north of the spring. The water comes out of a cleft in a cliff, near which is an ancient well with steps. There is a sacred place, with a large oak (Sindian), and a ruined shrine, south-west of the village, near 'Ain er Raja. There are drafted stones in many houses, and remains of well-built enclosures, now ruined. Many well-cut rock tombs are also found on either side."

Also in the village were "rock-cut tombs with kokim [...]". A subterranean channel led out from the spring that contained small fish and there were pillar shafts there too. To the west of the village under an oak tree lay the ruins of a Maqam (shrine) for Sheikh Abu Hasan among the remains of other old drystone enclosures. To the north of the maqam was a rock-cut tomb, "with three loculi under arcosolia." Tombs also lay to the northeast and southwest with well-cut arched doors. In the valley to the northwest was a modern vault with a mihrab.

=== British Mandate period ===
In the 1922 census of Palestine conducted by the British Mandate authorities, Yasuf had a population of 172, all Muslims, while in the 1931 census it had 61 occupied houses and a population of 257, still all Muslim.

In the 1945 statistics the population was 360, all Muslims, while the total land area was 6,068 dunams, according to an official land and population survey. Of this, 928 were allocated for plantations and irrigable land, 1,991 for cereals, while 35 dunams were classified as built-up areas.

=== Jordanian period ===
In the wake of the 1948 Arab–Israeli War, and after the 1949 Armistice Agreements, Yasuf came under Jordanian rule.

The Jordanian census of 1961 found 585 inhabitants here.

=== 1967–present ===
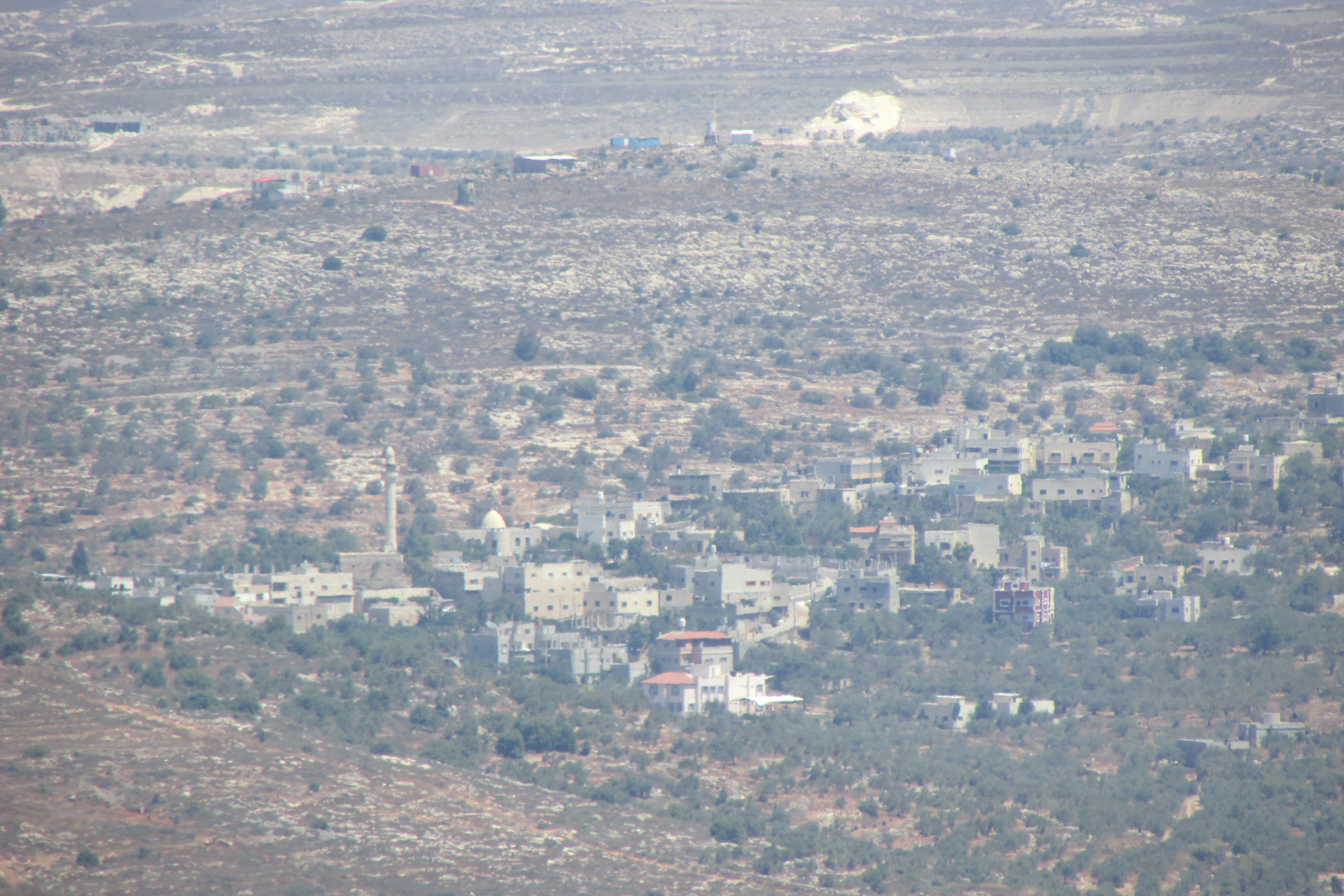
Yasuf from afar

Since the Six-Day War in 1967, Yasuf has been under Israeli occupation.

After the 1995 accords, 25.5% of village land is defined as Area B land, while the remainder 74.5% is Area C. Israel has made numerous confiscations of village land, including confiscating 602 dunums for the establishment of the Israeli settlement of Kfar Tapuah.

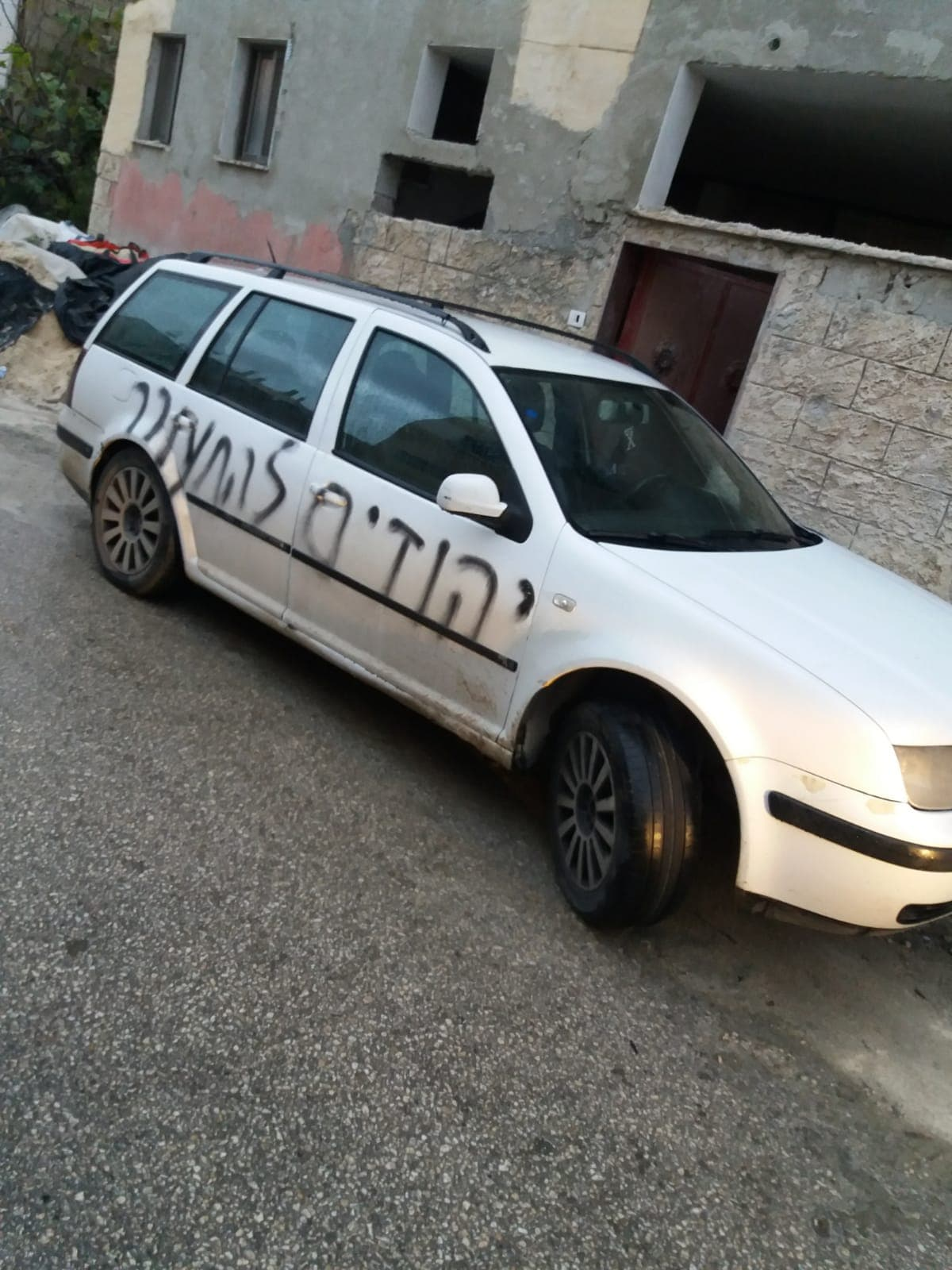
"Price tag" action on Dec 2018 in Yasuf, The Hebrew writing is "Jews wake up"

On 11 December 2009, Yasuf's Al-Kabir Mosque was vandalized and burnt. Israeli police suspect the action was undertaken by Israeli settlers. Prayer carpets and holy books were destroyed in the fire, and the arsonists left behind graffiti reading, "We will burn all of you," and, "Prepare to pay the price." A few months previous radical settlers declared that Palestinians in the West Bank would pay a "price tag" every time Israeli forces dismantled illegal Israeli settlement structures. Following the incident, Israeli forces opened fire on 100 Palestinian residents of the village who were protesting the arson.

In January 2010 the extremist settler Rabbi Yitzhak Shapira was arrested by the Israeli police for alleged involvement in the torching of the mosque. He denied any involvement, and was later released due to lack of evidence.

In April 2010 the settlers spray-painted elsewhere in the village the words "Thank you God, for not making me a Gentile".

== Israeli settler attacks ==
On October 6, 2014 Israeli settlers from Taffouh settlement ruined about 100 olive trees in Yasuf and 20 others in Burin, said Ghassan Daghlas, who is in charge of monitoring illegal settlers' activities in the area.

== Tell Abu Zarad ==
Near Yasuf lies a significant archaeological tell known as Tell Abu Zarad. Positioned atop an dominating hill (PAL 171/167), it is home to a Muslim tomb-shrine dedicated to Sheikh Abu Zarad (or Abu az-Zurd). This location may be identified with a biblical named Tappuah, which is also associated with a place of the same name mentioned in a Qumran text. The majority of the potsherds found here date back to the Middle Bronze Age and Iron Age II.

== Bibliography ==
- Barron, J.B., ed. (1923). Palestine: Report and General Abstracts of the Census of 1922. Government of Palestine.
- Conder, C.R.; Kitchener, H.H. (1882). The Survey of Western Palestine: Memoirs of the Topography, Orography, Hydrography, and Archaeology. Vol. 2. London: Committee of the Palestine Exploration Fund.
- Conder, C.R. (1876). "Samaritan Topography". Quarterly Statement – Palestine Exploration Fund. 8 (4): 182–197. doi:10.1179/peq.1876.8.4.182.
- Dauphin, C. (1998). La Palestine byzantine, Peuplement et Populations. BAR International Series 726 (in French). Vol. III : Catalogue. Oxford: Archeopress. ISBN 0-860549-05-4.
- Drory, Joseph (1988). "Hanbalis of the Nablus Region in the Eleventh and Twelfth Centuries". Asian and African Studies. 22: 93–112. Archived from the original on 2018-03-01.
- Ellenblum, R. (2003). Frankish Rural Settlement in the Latin Kingdom of Jerusalem. Cambridge University Press. ISBN 9780521521871.
- Finkelstein, I.; Lederman, Zvi, eds. (1997). Highlands of many cultures. Tel Aviv: Institute of Archaeology of Tel Aviv University Publications Section. ISBN 965-440-007-3.
- Government of Jordan, Department of Statistics (1964). First Census of Population and Housing. Volume I: Final Tables; General Characteristics of the Population (PDF).
- Government of Palestine, Department of Statistics (1945). Village Statistics, April, 1945.
- Guérin, V. (1875). Description Géographique Historique et Archéologique de la Palestine (in French). Vol. 2: Samarie, pt. 2. Paris: L'Imprimerie Nationale.
- Hadawi, S. (1970). Village Statistics of 1945: A Classification of Land and Area ownership in Palestine. Palestine Liberation Organization Research Center.
- Hütteroth, W.-D.; Abdulfattah, K. (1977). Historical Geography of Palestine, Transjordan and Southern Syria in the Late 16th Century. Erlanger Geographische Arbeiten, Sonderband 5. Erlangen, Germany: Vorstand der Fränkischen Geographischen Gesellschaft. ISBN 3-920405-41-2.
- Le Strange, G. (1890). Palestine Under the Moslems: A Description of Syria and the Holy Land from A.D. 650 to 1500. Committee of the Palestine Exploration Fund.
- Mills, E., ed. (1932). Census of Palestine 1931. Population of Villages, Towns and Administrative Areas. Jerusalem: Government of Palestine.
- Palmer, E.H. (1881). The Survey of Western Palestine: Arabic and English Name Lists Collected During the Survey by Lieutenants Conder and Kitchener, R. E. Transliterated and Explained by E.H. Palmer. Committee of the Palestine Exploration Fund.
- Safrai, Z. (1994). The economy of Roman Palestine (Illustrated ed.). Routledge. ISBN 0-415-10243-X.
