= Nofei Nehemia =

Israeli settlement in the West Bank

Nofei Nehemia: נופי נחמיה (Hebrew)
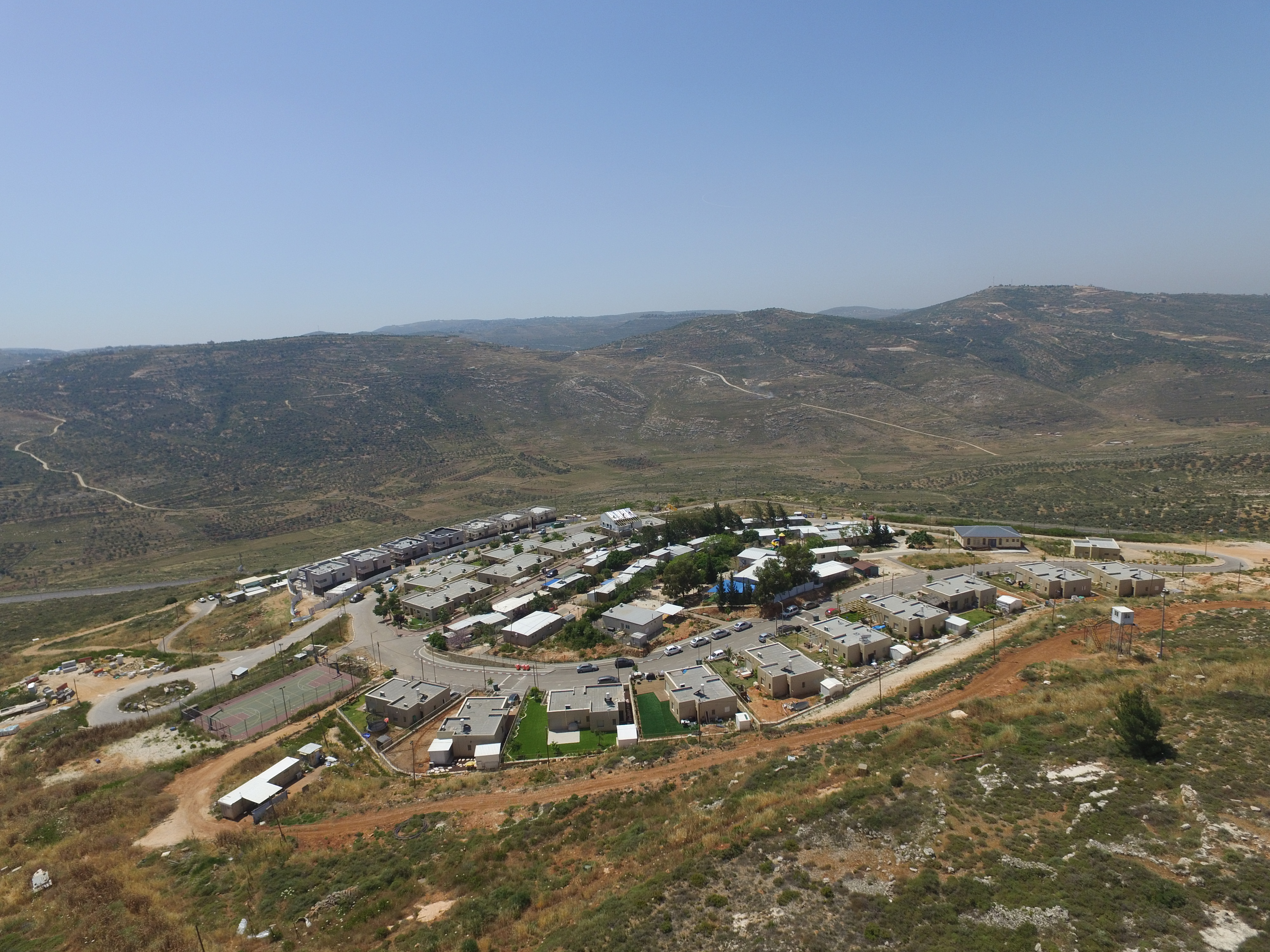
- Etymology: Nehemia's view
- Location within the Northern West Bank
- Coordinates: 32°5′53.19″N 35°14′9.01″E
- Country: Israel
- District: Judea and Samaria Area
- Council: Shomron
- Region: West Bank
- Affiliation: Jewish
- Founded: 2002
- Founder: Amana
- Website: www.yeshuv.org/nofi-nechemiya.html

Nofei Nehemia (Hebrew: נוֹפֵי נְחֶמְיָה) is an Israeli settlement in the West Bank, in the jurisdiction of the Shomron Regional Council in the northern West Bank. It is officially within the boundaries of Rehelim, a nearby Israeli settlement. First established in 2002, it is situated adjacent to Rehelim on Route 60, between Kfar Tapuach and Eli. The village also lies adjacent to the Palestinian towns of Iskaka and Yasuf. A few dozen families live on the village.

The international community considers Israeli settlements in the West Bank illegal under international law, but the Israeli government disputes this.

== History ==
The village is named after Nehemia Ben Yehuda, the head of a family who owns a crane company who have been very involved in assisting the establishment of settlements in the West Bank.

The village was established in 2002 as an illegal outpost. In 2003, the Israeli government pledged to dismantle the village.

In January 2021, under Benjamin Netanyahu, the Israeli government decided to legalize Nofei Nehemia by reclassifying it as a “neighborhood” of the Rehelim settlement, which itself was an illegal outpost that was legalized a few years prior. In June 2022 a group of around 20 people from Nofei Nehemia – mostly teenagers – attempted to establish an outpost on land belonging to Iskaka; this led to a confrontation between the settlers and the people of Iskaka in which a Palestinian man was killed.
