= Rehelim =

Israeli settlement in the West Bank

Rehelim: רְחלים (Hebrew)
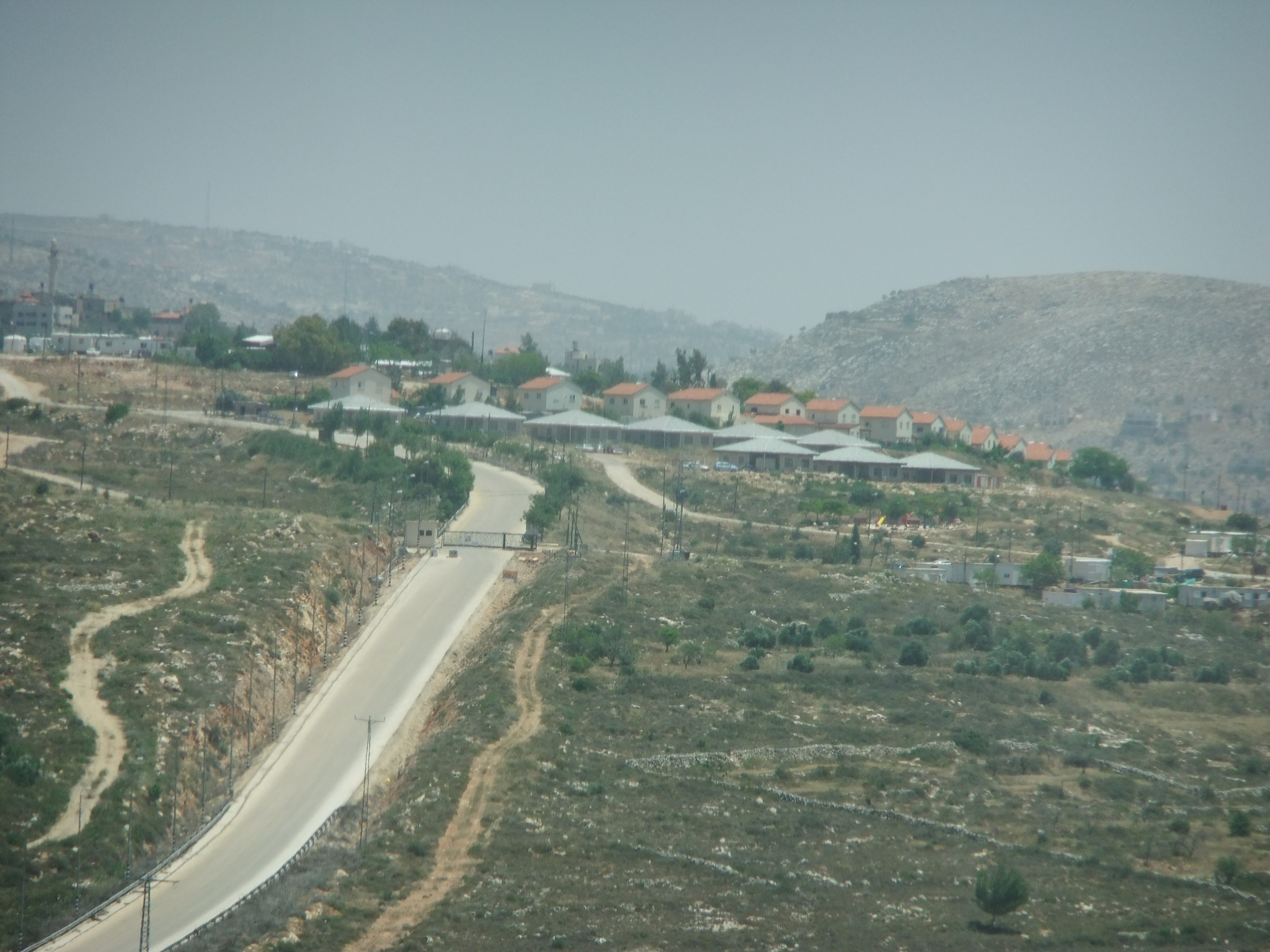

- Location within the Northern West Bank
- Coordinates: 32°6′10″N 35°15′26″E
- Country: Palestine
- District: Judea and Samaria Area
- Council: Shomron
- Region: West Bank
- Affiliation: Amana
- Founded: 1991
- Population (2024): 1,260

Rehelim (Hebrew: רְחלים) is an Israeli settlement in the northern West Bank. Located on Route 60, between Kfar Tapuach and Eli, east of Ariel and adjacent to the Palestinian towns of Yatma and Qabalan, it falls under the jurisdiction of Shomron Regional Council. The settlement was established in 1991 and in 2024 it had a population of 1,260.

In 2021, under Benjamin Netanyahu, the Israeli government decided to legalize the illegal, nearby outpost of Nofei Nehemia, by reclassifying it as a “neighborhood” of the Rehelim settlement, which itself was an illegal outpost that was legalized a few years prior. The international community considers Israeli settlements in the West Bank illegal under international law, but the Israeli government disputes this.

== History ==
On 27 October 1991, busloads of Israeli settlers were on their way to a protest in Tel Aviv against the peace negotiations in Madrid, when one of the buses came under attack from Palestinians. The driver, Yitzhak Rofeh from West Jerusalem, and Rachel Drouk, of Shilo, were killed. After Rachel's funeral, women from settlements all over the West Bank set up tents at the site, and remained there despite official disapproval. For a long time, only women and children lived there. It was named "Rehelim" (plural of the name "Rachel") after 3 Rachels: Rachel Drouk; Rachel Weiss, who was killed in the Jericho bus firebombing; and the matriarch Rachel. According to one of its founders, Shabtay Bendet, who left Rehelim later to work for the Peace Now NGO as director of their settlements watch, “We created facts on the ground without any approval from the government and only worked tried to get permission after the fact."

According to ARIJ, Israel confiscated 376 dunams of land from the Palestinian village of As-Sawiya in order to construct Rehelim.

In 1999, the Council of the European Union reported that Rehelim had gained retroactive approval from the Israeli government on the basis of its location being on survey land that was transferred to state land. In 2007 the Israel Central Bureau of Statistics listed a change in the status of Rehelim as belonging to the area of Kfar Tapuach, and not an independent settlement. However, the settlement was officially recognised in 2012.

In 2016, Rehelim opened its doors to Yehuda Libman, a rabbi formerly of the settlement of Yitzhar and a lieutenant colonel in the Israel Defense Forces reserves, allowing him to establish the Pri Ha'aretz yeshiva on the settlement's outskirts. Two years later, a Palestinian woman was killed by a rock thrown at her vehicle near Rehelim. The Shin Bet subsequently arrested five students from the yeshiva, alleging they were responsible for the attack.

In January 2021, under Benjamin Netanyahu, the Israeli government decided to legalize the illegal, nearby outpost of Nofei Nehemia, by reclassifying it as a “neighborhood” of the Rehelim settlement, which itself had been an illegal outpost that was legalized a few years prior. In 2024, it had a population of 1,260.

== Economy ==
The Tura boutique winery is located in Rehelim. The winery was founded in 2003 as Erez Winery, and renamed in 2005. The grapes are grown in vineyards on Har Brakha- at an elevation of 840 meters. In 2010, the winery was producing some 12,000 bottles annually, chiefly from Cabernet Sauvignon, Merlot and Chardonnay grapes.
