= Salfit Governorate =

Governorate of Palestine

Coordinates: 32°7′5.5″N 35°5′25″E

- Governorate
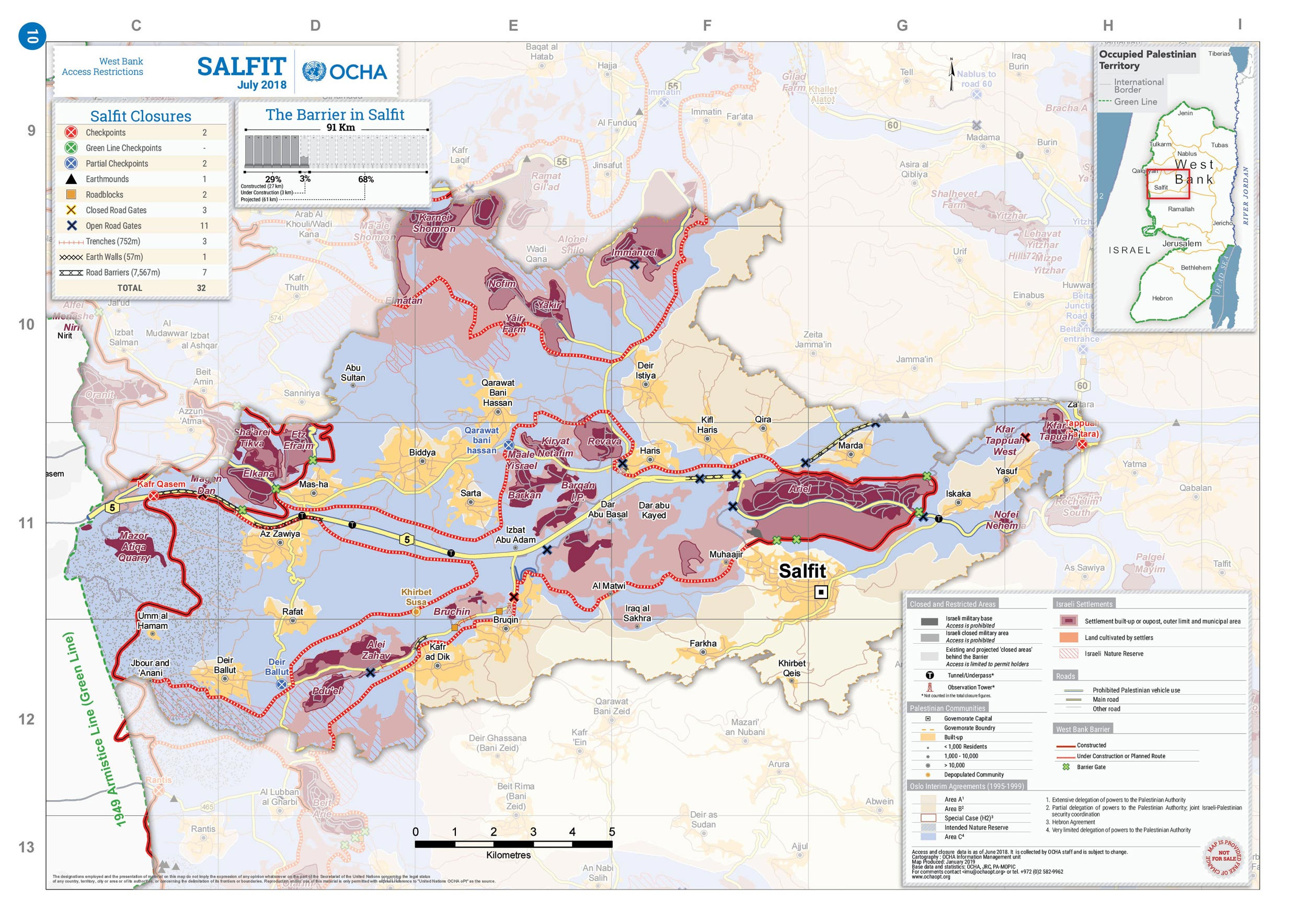
- 2018 United Nations map of the area, showing the Israeli occupation arrangements in the governorate

- Interactive map of Salfit Governorate
- Country: Palestine

Area
  - Total: 191 km^{2} (74 sq mi)

Population (2017)
  - Total: 75,444
- This figure excludes the Israeli West Bank Settlements

Salfit Governorate (Arabic: محافظة سلفيت) is one of the 16 Governorates of the State of Palestine. It is located in the northwestern West Bank, held under Israeli occupation, bordered by the governorates of Ramallah and al-Bireh to the south, Nablus to the east and Qalqilya in the north as well as, Israel to the west. Its district capital and largest city is Salfit. According to the Palestinian Central Bureau of Statistics (PCBS), the governorate had a population of 75,444 inhabitants in mid-year 2017. In the PCBS's census in 1997, which registered 46,671 residents, refugees accounted for 7.7% of the total population. There were 37,613 male residents and 36,143 females.

== History ==
During the Ottoman period, the region later forming the Salfit Governorate belonged to Jabal Nablus. Like other regions of Nablus' peripheral hinterland, it followed the provincial center, led by a closely knit web of economic, social and political relations between Nablus’ urban notables and the city’s surroundings. With the help of rural trading partners, these urban notables established trading monopolies that transformed Jabal Nablus’ autarkic economy into an export-driven market, shipping vast quantities of cash crops and finished goods to off-shore markets. Increasing demand for these commodities in the Ottoman Empire’s urban centers and in Europe spurred demographic growth and settlement expansion in the lowlands surrounding Jabal Nablus.

In the 18th and 19th centuries, the territory of the Salfit Governorate comprised part of Bilad Jamm'ain.Situated between Dayr Ghassāna in the south and the present Route 5 in the north, and between Majdal Yābā in the west and Jammā‘īn, Mardā and Kifl Ḥāris in the east, this area served, according to historian Roy Marom, "as a buffer zone between the political-economic-social units of the Jerusalem and the Nablus regions. On the political level, it suffered from instability due to the migration of the Bedouin tribes and the constant competition among local clans for the right to collect taxes on behalf of the Ottoman authorities.”

== Location ==
It extends from the village of Za'tara in the east and ends near the Israeli city of Kafr Qasim. It is bordered by the Nablus governorate on the eastern side; the governorates of Nablus and Qalqiliya on the northern side; to the south Ramallah and Al-Bireh; and the Green Line from the west.

The city of Salfit is located in the eastern part of the city, about 34 km north of the city of Ramallah; 20 km from the Green Line (Armistice Line 1949); and approximately 26 km south of Nablus, And about 35.5 km southeast of the city of Qalqiliya.

== Population ==
The population of Salfit Governorate, according to the general population census 2017, conducted by the Palestinian Central Bureau of Statistics about 75,444 people, or 2.6% of the population of the West Bank, and 1.57% of the population of Palestine in 1967. 37,613 are male and 36,143 are female.

== Education ==
The Directorate of Education and Higher Education in Salfit has 71 public schools distributed in the villages and towns of the governorate, in addition to the schools of Zeta Jama'in village in Nablus governorate.

And two private schools in Salfit and Badia,

Higher Education: A branch of Al-Quds Open University has been located in the governorate center since the 1998/99 school year and a service office in Bidia city since 2006. Work is ongoing on the construction of Al Zaytoonah University for Science and Technology in East Salfit in the Wad Al Sha'er lands.

The number of illiterates (15 years and over) according to the census of 2017 = 1750 citizens in Salfit Governorate, or 2.3% of the population.

== Health ==
The 18 clinics and government health centers are located in all the villages and towns of the governorate.

The governorate has only one hospital, the Yasser Arafat Governmental Hospital, which provides services to residents of Salfit, southern Nablus and northern Ramallah.

The number of registered births in the governorate of Salfit in 2015 = 2014 births, and the number of deaths recorded in the same year 214 deaths.

According to the 2017 census, 60.1% of citizens have health insurance in Salfit Governorate.

== Sports and culture ==
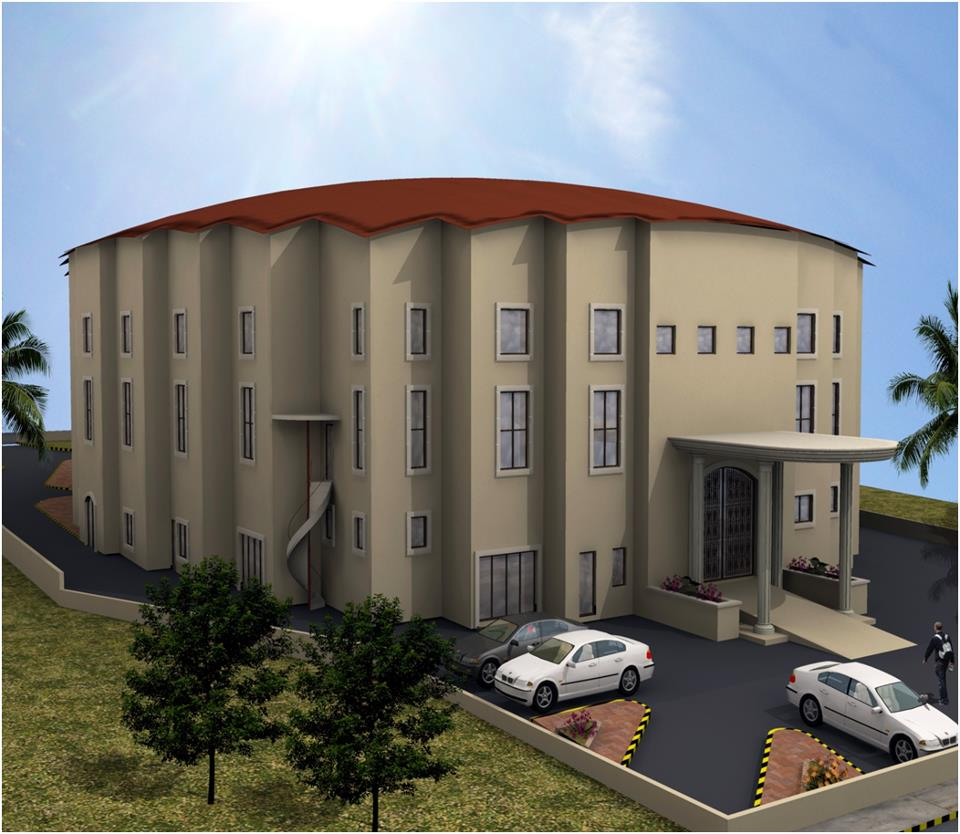
Salfit Sports Hall

The number of sports clubs, youth centers and women's clubs in Salfit governorate in 2016 = 23 is as follows: (16 sports clubs + 6 youth centers + 1 women's club).

Preservation of primitive playgrounds in a number of communities, a closed gymnasium and a training camp in the city of Salfit.

Cultural centers numbered 13,016 (all cultural centers, no theaters, museums or cinemas).

== Religious endowments and shrines ==
There are 39 houses in Salfit Governorate, 26 of which are within the boundaries of the villages and 13 are outside but belong to the village. The corner and Kufr al-Deek are the most villages that contain the maqamat, followed by Salfit, Kafl Hares and Badia.

The number of mosques operating in 2016 = 74 mosques.

Some sites Maqamat

Haris village: the shrine of Sheikh Hussein, the shrine of Sheikh Osman, and the shrine of Abu Abdullah.

Deir Istiya town: The shrine of Sheikh Khater.

Qarawat Bani Hassan town: the shrine of Amr ibn al-Aas.

Badia City: Sheikh Al Dajani Shrine, Sheikh Hamdan Shrine.

Kefl Hares town: the tomb of the Prophet Al-Nun, the shrine of Salah al-Din al-Ayyubi, the shrine of the Prophet with the Kifl.

Kafr El Deek town: The Tomb of Sheikh Imbeh.

Marda village: the tomb of the Prophet Thuraya, the shrine of Imam Badr, and the shrine of Sheikh Juma.

Zawia town: the shrine of Sheikh Qassem.

Salfit city: the shrine of Abu Attab, the shrine of Taruja.

== Archaeology ==
The Salfit Governorate contains 140 archaeological sites that reflect a cultural diversity that dates back to different periods, such as Assyrian, Roman and Islamic, some of which were destroyed under the wall of annexation and expansion. The other is Deir Qala in the village of Derblout, Khirbet al-Shajara in Salfit, and Simean monastery in Kafr El Deek. There are also 32 graves, most of which were exposed to desecration and vandalism.

From archaeological sites:

Yasuf Village: Abu Zard Hill.

Kafr El Deek town: The Monastery of Samaan.

Salfit City: Khirbet al-Shajara, Khirbat Jalal al-Din and Khirbet Ras Qora.

Badia City: Khirbat Karam Issa and the Jebel Al Ras, Khallet Jarrah and Qurna Ali.

Bruqin town: Khirbet Qirqash.

Deir Balout town: Deir Qala.

Marda village: Khirbet Abu Rawa'a and Khirbet Deir Bajala.

Zawiya town: Old mosque.

== Localities ==
- Biddya
- Bruqin
- Deir Ballut
- Deir Istiya
- Farkha
- Haris
- Iskaka
- Kafr ad-Dik
- Kifl Hares
- Marda
- Mas-ha
- Qarawat Bani Hassan
- Qira
- Rafat
- Sarta
- Yasuf
- az-Zawiya
