= Hanbali (nisba) =

Hanbali (Arabic: الحنبلي) is an Arabic nisba that means "of Hanbal", implying a follower of the Hanbali Madhhab.

People using it in their names it include:

- Ibn Hamdan al-Hanbali — Hanbalite Muslim scholar and judge.
- Diya al-Din al-Maqdisi al-Hanbali — Hanbali Islamic scholar.
- Ibn Rajab al-Hanbali — Hanbali Islamic scholar.
- Mujir al-Din al-Hanbali — Jerusalemite qadi and Palestinian historian.
- Ibn al-Imad al-Hanbali — Muslim historian and faqih of the Hanbali school.
- Muhammad Abd al-Rahim al-Hanbali (ar) — member of Izz ad-Din al-Qassam Brigades.

== See also ==
- Arabic name
