= Iskaka =

- Municipality type D (Village council)

Arabic transcription(s)
  - Arabic: إسكاكا
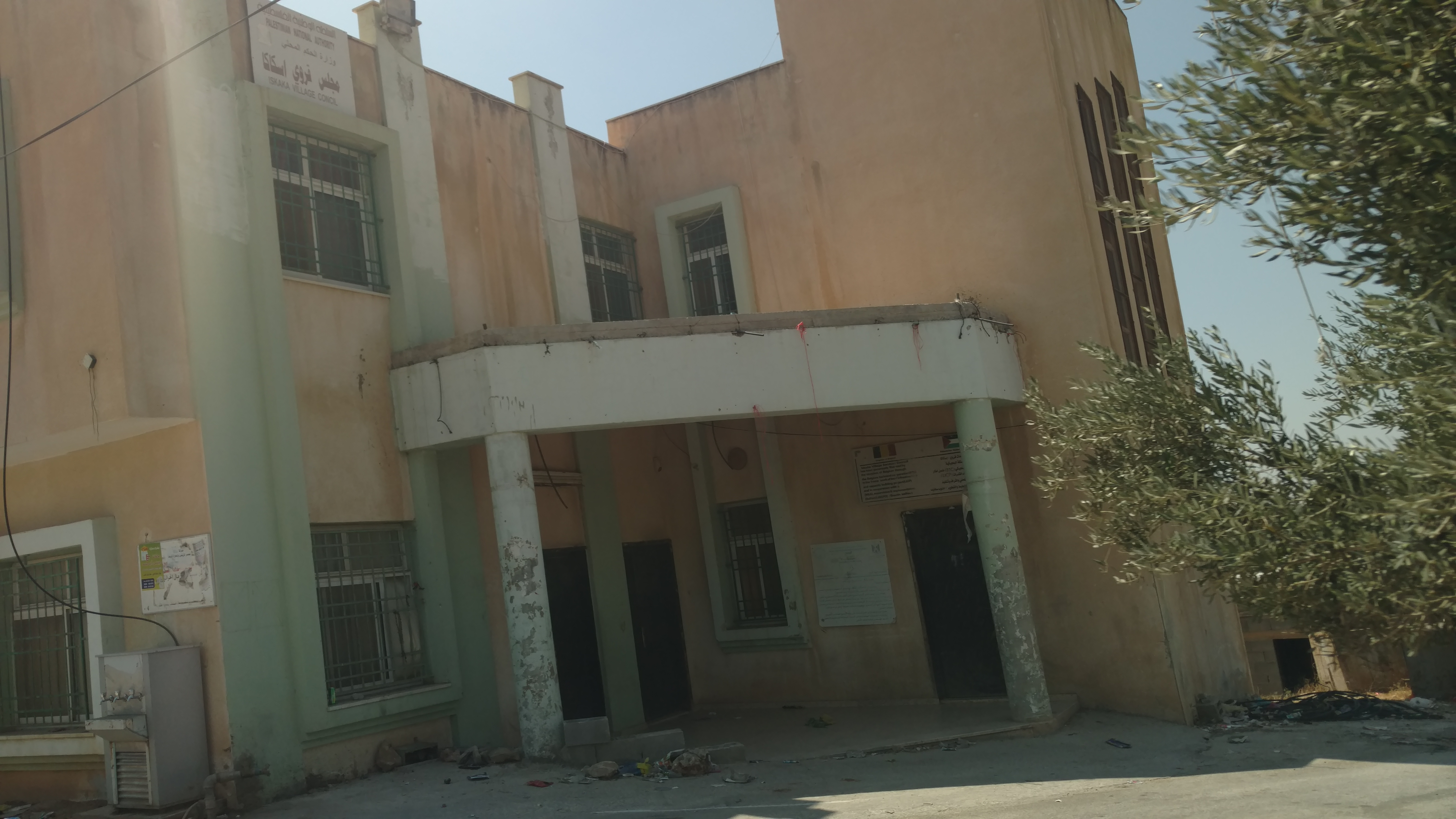
- Iskaka village council building

- Location of Iskaka within Palestine
- Coordinates: 32°06′13″N 35°13′31″E
- Palestine grid: 171/167
- State: State of Palestine
- Governorate: Salfit

Government
  - Type: Village council
- Elevation: 660 m (2,170 ft)

Population (2017)
  - Total: 1,198
- Name meaning: Roads situated at a junction

Iskaka (Arabic: إسكاكا) is a Palestinian town in the Salfit Governorate of the State of Palestine, in the northern West Bank, 27 kilometers southwest of Nablus. According to the Palestinian Central Bureau of Statistics, it had a population of 1,198 in 2017.

== Location ==
Iskaka is 4.6 kilometers (2.9 mi) east of Salfit. It is bordered by As Sawiya to the east, Al Lubban ash Sharqiya to the east and south, Salfit to the south and west, and Marda, Yasuf and Jamma'in to the north.

== History ==
Ceramics from the Byzantine era have been found here.

The village is identified with Casale Esckas mentioned in a Frankish text of the year 1244. Sherds from the Crusader/Ayyubid and the Mamluk eras have been found here.

It is also suggested that this is Suchah, a place mentioned in the Samaritan chronicles.

=== Ottoman era ===
Iskaka was incorporated into the Ottoman Empire in 1517 with all of Palestine, and in 1596 it appeared in the tax registers under the name of Skaka, as being in the nahiya ("subdistrict") of Jabal Qubal, part of the Sanjak of Nablus. It had a population of 37 households; who were all Muslims. They paid a fixed tax-rate of 33.3% on agricultural products, including wheat, barley, summer crops, olive trees, goats and beehives, in addition to occasional revenues, a press for olive oil or grape syrup; a total of 5,042 akçe. Sherds from the early Ottoman era has also been found here.

In the 18th and 19th centuries, the village formed part of the highland region known as Jūrat ‘Amra or Bilād Jammā‘īn. Situated between Dayr Ghassāna in the south and the present Route 5 in the north, and between Majdal Yābā in the west and Jammā‘īn, Mardā and Kifl Ḥāris in the east, this area served, according to historian Roy Marom, "as a buffer zone between the political-economic-social units of the Jerusalem and the Nablus regions. On the political level, it suffered from instability due to the migration of the Bedouin tribes and the constant competition among local clans for the right to collect taxes on behalf of the Ottoman authorities."

In 1870, Victor Guérin noted it as an ancient village, on a hill planted with olive trees.

In 1870/1871 (1288 AH), an Ottoman census listed the village with a population of 27 households in the nahiya (sub-district) of Jamma'in al-Awwal, subordinate to Nablus.

In 1882, the PEF's Survey of Western Palestine described Iskaka as: "a small village with ruined towers and rock-cut tombs, surrounded by olives and standing on high ground. The water supply is from a well."

=== British Mandate era ===
In the 1922 census of Palestine conducted by the British Mandate authorities, Sekaka had a population of 127 Muslims, increasing in the 1931 census to 186 Muslims in 48 occupied houses.

In the 1945 statistics the population was 260 Muslims while the total land area was 5,311 dunams, according to an official land and population survey. Of this, 1,309 were allocated for plantations and irrigable land, 1,624 for cereals, while 12 dunams were classified as built-up areas.

=== Jordanian era ===
In the wake of the 1948 Arab–Israeli War, and after the 1949 Armistice Agreements, Iskaka came under Jordanian rule.

In 1961, the population of Iskaka was 415.

=== Post-1967 ===
Since the Six-Day War in 1967, Iskaka has been under Israeli occupation.

After the 1995 accords, 25% of village land is defined as Area B land, while the remaining 75% is Area C land. According to ARIJ, the Israelis have confiscated 356 dunams of land in Iskaka, including land for the Israeli settlements of Ariel, Nofei Nehemia and for the Israeli West Bank barrier.

On 14 May 2021, as part of the 2021 Israel–Palestine crisis, Israeli settlers reportedly killed 23-year-old Awad Ahmed Harb.

== Demography ==
According to ARIJ, most of the village residents are descendants of the Bani Atta tribe from Al-Hijaziya, who migrated to Palestine and settled in Jalud, Bani Ni'ma, and Gaza.

== Bibliography ==
- Barron, J.B., ed. (1923). Palestine: Report and General Abstracts of the Census of 1922. Government of Palestine.
- Conder, C.R.; Kitchener, H.H. (1882). The Survey of Western Palestine: Memoirs of the Topography, Orography, Hydrography, and Archaeology. Vol. 2. London: Committee of the Palestine Exploration Fund.
- Dauphin, C. (1998). La Palestine byzantine, Peuplement et Populations. BAR International Series 726 (in French). Vol. III : Catalogue. Oxford: Archeopress. ISBN 0-860549-05-4.
- Finkelstein, I.; Lederman, Zvi, eds. (1997). Highlands of many cultures. Tel Aviv: Institute of Archaeology of Tel Aviv University Publications Section. ISBN 965-440-007-3.
- Government of Jordan, Department of Statistics (1964). First Census of Population and Housing. Volume I: Final Tables; General Characteristics of the Population (PDF).
- Government of Palestine, Department of Statistics (1945). Village Statistics, April, 1945.
- Guérin, V. (1875). Description Géographique Historique et Archéologique de la Palestine (in French). Vol. 2: Samarie, pt. 2. Paris: L'Imprimerie Nationale.
- Hadawi, S. (1970). Village Statistics of 1945: A Classification of Land and Area ownership in Palestine. Palestine Liberation Organization Research Center.
- Hütteroth, W.-D.; Abdulfattah, K. (1977). Historical Geography of Palestine, Transjordan and Southern Syria in the Late 16th Century. Erlanger Geographische Arbeiten, Sonderband 5. Erlangen, Germany: Vorstand der Fränkischen Geographischen Gesellschaft. ISBN 3-920405-41-2.
- Mills, E., ed. (1932). Census of Palestine 1931. Population of Villages, Towns and Administrative Areas. Jerusalem: Government of Palestine.
- Palmer, E.H. (1881). The Survey of Western Palestine: Arabic and English Name Lists Collected During the Survey by Lieutenants Conder and Kitchener, R. E. Transliterated and Explained by E.H. Palmer. Committee of the Palestine Exploration Fund.
- Röhricht, R. (1893). (RRH) Regesta regni Hierosolymitani (MXCVII-MCCXCI) (in Latin). Berlin: Libraria Academica Wageriana.
