= Marda, Salfit =

Marda
- Municipality type D (Village council)

Arabic transcription(s)
  - Arabic: مرده
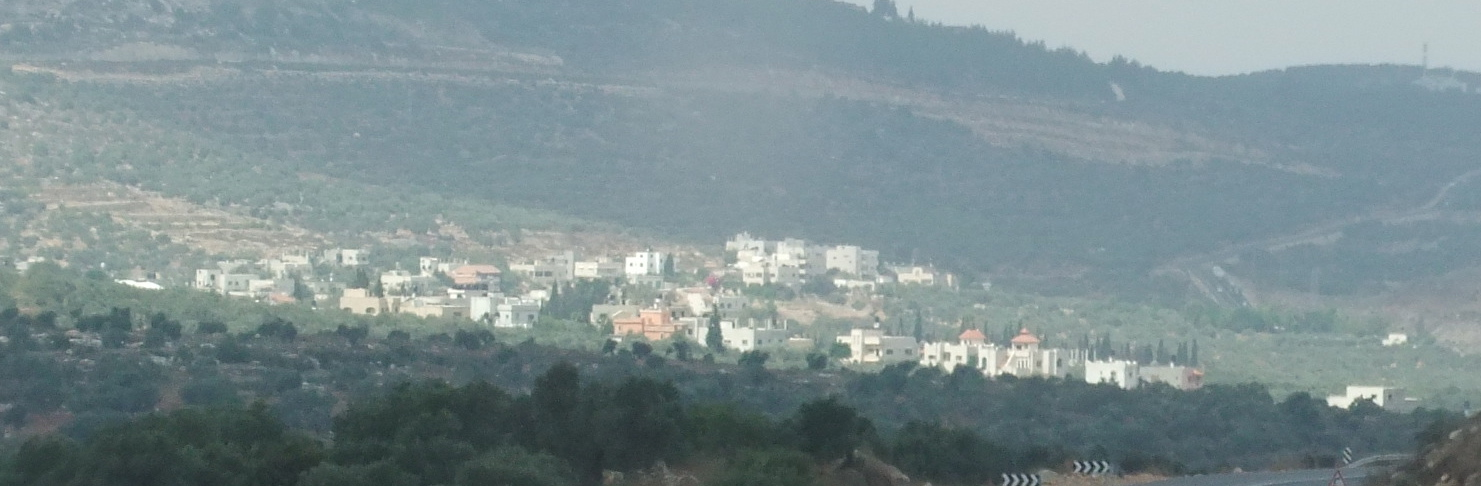
- Marda

- Location of Marda within Palestine
- Coordinates: 32°06′47″N 35°11′44″E
- Palestine grid: 168/168
- State: State of Palestine
- Governorate: Salfit

Government
  - Type: Village council
- Elevation: 449 m (1,473 ft)

Population (2017)
  - Total: 2,375
- Name meaning: from personal name

Marda (Arabic: مرده) is a Palestinian town in the Salfit Governorate of the State of Palestine, in the northern West Bank, 18 kilometers southwest of Nablus. A previously important rural and religious center under the Mamluks and Ottomans, it had a population of 2,375 in 2017.

== Location ==
Marda is 3.6 kilometers (2.2 mi) north of Salfit. It is bordered by Iskaka and Jamma'in villages to the east, Salfit to the south, Kifl Haris and Qira villages to the west, and Jamma'in village to the north. The Israeli settlement of Ariel lies immediately south of Marda.

== History ==
According to Ellenblum, no remains from the Byzantine era have been found here. According to Ben-Zvi, there was a Samaritan population in Marda during the Fatimid period. The village is mentioned as Marda and Mardan in the 14th century Samaritan Chronicle.

During the Crusader period, Diya' al-Din (1173–1245) writes that there was a Muslim population in the village, and that followers of Ibn Qudamah lived here. The maternal grandmother of Diya' al-Din came from Marda.

Yakut (1179–1229) noted that Marda was a "village near Nablus". Ben-Zvi cites a Samaritan text according which a priest by the name of Isaac son of Abraham who had resided in Marda relocated to Gaza, presumably during Saladin's rule, and it appears that the Samaritan community there lasted up until this time.

Marda flourished in the 12th-16th centuries as a center for Islamic jurisprudence and Hanbali learning. Muslim biographical dictionaries list 55 scholars from Marda, including important Hanbali chief judge, Amin-ed-dyn 'Abd-er-Rahman, was born in the village in the early 15th century.

=== Ottoman era ===
Marda was incorporated into the Ottoman Empire in 1517 with all of Palestine, and in 1596 it appeared in the tax registers under the name of Marda, as being in the nahiya ("subdistrict") of Jabal Qubal, part of the Sanjak of Nablus. With a population of 163 Muslim households, it was the largest rural center in the entire district, second only to Tulkarm. During this era it was an important market town, one of the largest in the area. The residents paid a fixed tax-rate of 33.3% on agricultural products, including wheat, barley, summer crops, olive trees, goats and beehives, in addition to occasional revenues, a press for olive oil or grape syrup, and a market toll; a total of 25,634 akçe. All of the revenue went to a Muslim charitable endowment.

In the 18th and 19th centuries, Marda formed part of the highland region known as Jūrat Marda or Bilād Jammā‘īn. Situated between Dayr Ghassāna in the south and the present Route 5 in the north, and between Majdal Yābā in the west and Jammā‘īn, Mardā and Kifl Ḥāris in the east, this area served, according to historian Roy Marom, "as a buffer zone between the political-economic-social units of the Jerusalem and the Nablus regions. On the political level, it suffered from instability due to the migration of the Bedouin tribes and the constant competition among local clans for the right to collect taxes on behalf of the Ottoman authorities."

In 1838, Edward Robinson noted it as a village, Merda, in the Jurat Merda district, south of Nablus.

In 1870 Victor Guérin observed: "the mosque, now partly destroyed, lies east and west, and seems to have succeeded a Christian church. Before it lies a platform, beside which are a cistern and a small birket. There are also several broken capitals lying on the ground."

In 1870/1871 (1288 AH), an Ottoman census listed the village in the nahiya (sub-district) of Jamma'in al-Thani, subordinate to Nablus.

In 1882, the PEF's Survey of Western Palestine described Merdah as: "a village of moderate size on low ground surrounded by olives."

=== British Mandate era ===
In the 1922 census of Palestine conducted by the British Mandate authorities, Marda had a population of 290 Muslims, increasing in the 1931 census to 356 Muslims in 103 occupied houses.

In the 1945 statistics the population was 470 Muslims while the total land area was 9,021 dunams, according to an official land and population survey. Of this, 1,796 were allocated for plantations and irrigable land, 3,176 for cereals, while 72 dunams were classified as built-up areas.

=== Jordanian era ===
In the wake of the 1948 Arab–Israeli War, and after the 1949 Armistice Agreements, Marda came under Jordanian rule.

The Jordanian census of 1961 found 852 inhabitants in Marda.

=== Post-1967 ===
Since the Six-Day War in 1967, Marda has been under Israeli occupation.

After the 1995 accords, 15.8% of village land is defined as Area B land, while the remaining 84.2% is Area C land. According to ARIJ, Marda has suffered "numerous Israeli confiscations for the benefit of the various Israeli objectives," including the confiscations of 2,566 dunums (29%) of village land to establish the Israeli settlement of Ariel just south of Marda. In addition, land was confiscated from Salfit, Kifl Haris and Iskaka villages for Ariel.

According to what the head of the village council told HRW: "We used to have 10,000 animals, now you can barely find 100, because there is nowhere for them to graze. So the economy collapsed and unemployment increased." He further noted, that as a result of the Israeli land confiscations, many of the Marda villagers now have little choice but to work in Israeli settlements.

On 14 May 2021 during the 2021 demonstrations, 38-year-old Sharif Khaled Suleiman was killed.

== Bibliography ==
- Barron, J.B., ed. (1923). Palestine: Report and General Abstracts of the Census of 1922. Government of Palestine.
- Conder, C.R. (1876). "Samaritan Topography". Quarterly Statement – Palestine Exploration Fund. 8 (4): 182–197. doi:10.1179/peq.1876.8.4.182.
- Conder, C.R.; Kitchener, H.H. (1882). The Survey of Western Palestine: Memoirs of the Topography, Orography, Hydrography, and Archaeology. Vol. 2. London: Committee of the Palestine Exploration Fund.
- Dauphin, C. (1998). La Palestine byzantine, Peuplement et Populations. BAR International Series 726 (in French). Vol. III : Catalogue. Oxford: Archeopress. ISBN 0-860549-05-4. (p. 809)
- Drory, Joseph (1988). "Hanbalis of the Nablus Region in the Eleventh and Twelfth Centuries". Asian and African Studies. 22: 93–112. Archived from the original on 2018-03-01.
- Ellenblum, R. (2003). Frankish Rural Settlement in the Latin Kingdom of Jerusalem. Cambridge University Press. ISBN 9780521521871.
- Finkelstein, I.; Lederman, Zvi, eds. (1997). Highlands of many cultures. Tel Aviv: Institute of Archaeology of Tel Aviv University Publications Section. ISBN 965-440-007-3.
- Government of Jordan, Department of Statistics (1964). First Census of Population and Housing. Volume I: Final Tables; General Characteristics of the Population (PDF).
- Government of Palestine, Department of Statistics (1945). Village Statistics, April, 1945.
- Guérin, V. (1875). Description Géographique Historique et Archéologique de la Palestine (in French). Vol. 2: Samarie, pt. 2. Paris: L'Imprimerie Nationale.
- Hadawi, S. (1970). Village Statistics of 1945: A Classification of Land and Area ownership in Palestine. Palestine Liberation Organization Research Center.
- Hütteroth, W.-D.; Abdulfattah, K. (1977). Historical Geography of Palestine, Transjordan and Southern Syria in the Late 16th Century. Erlanger Geographische Arbeiten, Sonderband 5. Erlangen, Germany: Vorstand der Fränkischen Geographischen Gesellschaft. ISBN 3-920405-41-2.
- Le Strange, G. (1890). Palestine Under the Moslems: A Description of Syria and the Holy Land from A.D. 650 to 1500. Committee of the Palestine Exploration Fund.
- Mills, E., ed. (1932). Census of Palestine 1931. Population of Villages, Towns and Administrative Areas. Jerusalem: Government of Palestine.
- Moudjir ed-dyn (1876). Sauvaire (ed.). Histoire de Jérusalem et d'Hébron depuis Abraham jusqu'à la fin du XVe siècle de J.-C. : fragments de la Chronique de Moudjir-ed-dyn.
- Palmer, E.H. (1881). The Survey of Western Palestine: Arabic and English Name Lists Collected During the Survey by Lieutenants Conder and Kitchener, R. E. Transliterated and Explained by E.H. Palmer. Committee of the Palestine Exploration Fund.
- Robinson, E.; Smith, E. (1841). Biblical Researches in Palestine, Mount Sinai and Arabia Petraea: A Journal of Travels in the year 1838. Vol. 3. Boston: Crocker & Brewster.
- Talmon-Heller, Daniella (1994). "Popular Hanbalite Islam in 12th–13th Century Jabal Nablus and Jabal Qasyūn". Studia Islamica. 79: 103–120. doi:10.2307/1595838. JSTOR 1595838.
- Talmon-Heller, Daniella (2002). Riley-Smith, J. (ed.). The Cited Tales of the Wondrous Doings of the Shaykhs of the Holy Land. Vol. 1. published in Crusades. Aldershot, Hampshire: Published by Ashgate for the Society for the Study of the Crusades and the Latin East. pp. 111–154. ISBN 0754609189.
