= Jamma'in =

Jammain
- Municipality type C

Arabic transcription(s)
  - Arabic: جمّاعين
  - Latin: Jamma'in (official); Jamma'een (unofficial)
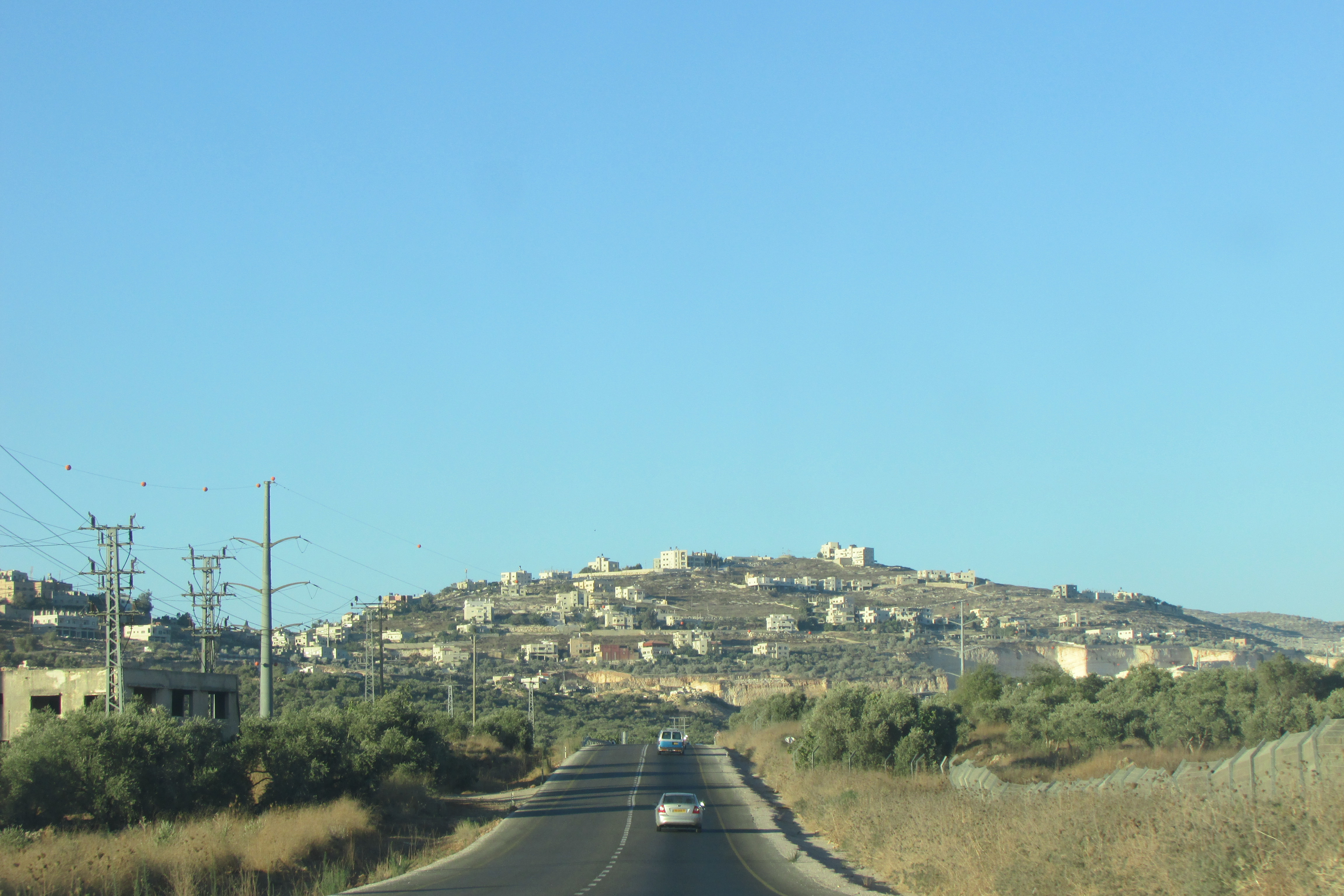
- Jammain

- Location of Jammain within Palestine
- Coordinates: 32°07′52″N 35°12′03″E
- Palestine grid: 169/170
- State: State of Palestine
- Governorate: Nablus

Government
  - Type: Municipality

Area
  - Total: 19.8 km^{2} (7.6 sq mi)

Population (2017)
  - Total: 7,436
  - Density: 376/km^{2} (973/sq mi)
- Name meaning: "Company"

Jamma'in (Arabic: جمّاعين) is a Palestinian town in the Nablus Governorate of the State of Palestine, in the northern West Bank, located 16 kilometers (9.9 mi) southwest of Nablus, 6 kilometers (3.7 mi) northwest of Salfit and 40 kilometers (25 mi) north of Ramallah. According to the Palestinian Central Bureau of Statistics, the town had a population of 7,436 in 2017.

== Location ==
Jamma’in is located 11.26 km south of Nablus. It is bordered by 'Einabus and Huwwara to the east, Yasuf, Iskaka and Marda to the south, Zeita Jamma'in to the west, 'Asira al Qibliya and 'Urif to the north.

== History ==
Jamma'in is situated on a high hill on the ancient site. Carved stones have been reused in village houses, walls, fencing and agricultural terraces. Rock-cut cisterns have also been found. 400 meters north-west are tombs carved into rock which contains one loculi and caves (called I-Qubay'ah).

Sherds from the Iron Age I, IAII, Persian, Hellenistic, Roman and Byzantine eras have also been found here.

=== Middle Ages ===
A village in the Crusader era (1123 CE) named "Gemmail", has been identified with Jamma'in. It was referred to as "Jamma'il" in medieval Arabic sources. The village was home to the Bani Qudama clan, who moved to Damascus in 1156, during Crusader rule in Palestine. Their leader, and the khatib (Muslim preacher) of the village, Ahmad ibn Qudama (father of Ibn Qudamah and grandfather of Diya al-Din), left Jamma'in due to fears of persecution by King Baldwin, who intended to punish Ibn Qudamah for preaching against Crusader rule. The hilly and uninhabited area of Damascus the Banu Qudamah settled became the al-Salihiyah suburb, which was named either after the family, who were known as "the pious ones" (as-salihiyyin) or after the Abi Salih Mosque, which the family was associated with. Throughout the 11th and 12th centuries, Jamma'in was a center for Hanbali activity. The medieval Syrian geographer Yaqut (1179–1229) described the site as "A well in the hill of Nabulus, in the Filastin Province. It lies a day's journey distant from Jerusalem, and belongs to that city." Diya al-Din (1173-1245) refers to the presence of Muslims in Jamma'in during his lifetime, and he also noted that the village had a mosque.

Crusader/Ayyubid and Mamluk sherds have also been found here.

=== Ottoman era ===
Jamma'in was incorporated into the Ottoman Empire in 1517 with all of Palestine, and in 1596 it appeared in the tax registers as being in the nahiya of Jabal Qubal, part of Nablus Sanjak. It had an entirely Muslim population of eighteen households and five bachelors. The inhabitants of the village paid a fixed tax rate of 33.3% on wheat, barley, summer crops, olive trees, goats and/or beehives, and a press for grapes or olives; a total of 7,800 akçe.

In the 17th century, the Qasim family ruled Jamma'in and twenty nearby villages, including Awarta, Beit Wazan, Haris and Zeita. Jamma'in was the seat of the namesake Jamma'in subdistrict of the District of Nablus.Situated between Dayr Ghassāna in the south and the present Route 5 in the north, and between Majdal Yābā in the west and Jammā‘īn, Mardā and Kifl Ḥāris in the east, this area served, according to historian Roy Marom, "as a buffer zone between the political-economic-social units of the Jerusalem and the Nablus regions. On the political level, it suffered from instability due to the migration of the Bedouin tribes and the constant competition among local clans for the right to collect taxes on behalf of the Ottoman authorities.”

In 1834, when the Egyptians under Ibrahim Pasha ruled Palestine, Ottoman-aligned Arab families in Palestine revolted under the leadership of Qasim al-Ahmad. The revolt, however, was crushed, and Qasim and his two eldest sons were hanged. The Zeitawi tribe migrated to the town from nearby Zeita (from which the family received its name) in the 18th century.

In 1838, Edward Robinson noted it as a village, Jemma'in, in the Jurat Merda district, south of Nablus.

The French explorer Victor Guérin visited the village in 1870, and he estimated it had 1,400 inhabitants. The houses were better built than many other places in Palestine, and some seemed newly rebuilt.

In 1870/1871 (1288 AH), an Ottoman census listed the village with a population of 150 households in the nahiya (sub-district) of Jamma'in al-Awwal, subordinate to Nablus.

In 1882, the PEF's Survey of Western Palestine (SWP) described Jamma'in as "the largest village in the district, on high ground, surrounded with olive groves. The water supply is from a pool and a well east of the village."

=== British Mandate era ===
In the 1922 census of Palestine, conducted by the British Mandate authorities, Jamma'in had a population of 720, all Muslims, increasing in the 1931 census to 957, still all Muslims, living in 202 houses.

In the 1945 statistics, Jamma'in had a population of 1,240, all Muslims, with 19,821 dunams of land, according to an official land and population survey. Of this, 5,362 dunams were plantations and irrigable land, 6,625 used for cereals, while 78 dunams were built-up (urban) land.

=== Jordanian era ===
In the wake of the 1948 Arab–Israeli War, and after the 1949 Armistice Agreements, Jamma’in came under Jordanian rule.

In 1961, the population was 1,965.

=== Post-1967 ===
Since the Six-Day War in 1967, Jamma'in has been under Israeli occupation. Like many other Palestinian localities in the West Bank, Jamma'in's residents have been involved in the Israeli–Palestinian conflict, and have been a target of several raids by the Israel Defense Forces (IDF). Since the First Intifada in 1987, six people from the town have been killed by the IDF and hundreds of its residents have been imprisoned.

In January 2015 Israel forces set up an iron gate at the southern entrance to the village, its main exit point, blocking transit between Jamma'in and Marda. IDF soldiers deny entry to Palestinian citizens travelling in either direction. According to PA no explanation was given for the sudden move.

After the 1995 accords, 77% of village land was classified as Area B, the remaining 23% as Area C.

== Demographics ==
In the 1997 census by the Palestinian Central Bureau of Statistics (PCBS), Jaba' had a population of 4,311. Palestinian refugees accounted for 3.9% of the inhabitants. In the 2007 PCBS census, the population grew to 6,225, living in 1,010 households with each household containing an average of six members. There were 1,170 housing units. The gender ratio was 49.1% female and 50.9% male.

=== People from Jamma'in ===
- Abd al-Ghani al-Maqdisi
- Ibn Qudama

== Economy ==
The two most prominent economic sectors of Jamma'in is stone-cutting and agriculture. Since the Second Intifada, the stone-cutting industry has grown weaker due to the cost of electricity increasing and the cost of stone, to Israel and Jordan, has decreased. Some people work in Palestinian government offices in Ramallah. Basket-weaving is not a major economic sector, but along with Zeita and az-Zawiya, Jamma'in is well known for producing baskets made from olive wood fronds.

Olives are the primary crop grown. There are two or three sheep and cow farms in Jamma'in. Milk, yogurt and cheese are sold in the town. There are two mosques, a religious charity and a library in the town. There are five schools in Jamma'in; Two boys' schools, two girls' schools and co-ed school. Over 90% of the population over the age of 10 is literate. Most university students attend the an-Najah National University.

== Government ==
Jamma'in is governed by a municipal council of eleven members, including one reserved for females. In the 2005 Palestinian municipal elections, the Hamas-backed Al-Islamiya for Reform list won seven seats, the majority, and the Fatah-backed Martyrs list won three seats and an Independent list won the remaining seat. Female candidates won two seats. 'Izzat Mahmoud Zeitawi succeeded Ahmad Mahmoud Zeitawi as head of the municipality of Jamma'in.

== Bibliography ==
- Barron, J.B., ed. (1923). Palestine: Report and General Abstracts of the Census of 1922. Government of Palestine.
- Conder, C.R.; Kitchener, H.H. (1882). The Survey of Western Palestine: Memoirs of the Topography, Orography, Hydrography, and Archaeology. Vol. 2. London: Committee of the Palestine Exploration Fund.
- Dauphin, C. (1998). La Palestine byzantine, Peuplement et Populations. BAR International Series 726 (in French). Vol. III : Catalogue. Oxford: Archeopress. ISBN 0-860549-05-4.
- Doumani, B. (1995). Rediscovering Palestine: Merchants and Peasants in Jabal Nablus. University of California Press.
- Drory, Joseph (1988). "Hanbalis of the Nablus Region in the Eleventh and Twelfth Centuries". Asian and African Studies. 22: 93–112. Archived from the original on 2018-03-01.
- Ellenblum, R. (2003). Frankish Rural Settlement in the Latin Kingdom of Jerusalem. Cambridge University Press. ISBN 9780521521871.
- Finkelstein, I.; Lederman, Zvi, eds. (1997). Highlands of many cultures. Tel Aviv: Institute of Archaeology of Tel Aviv University Publications Section. ISBN 965-440-007-3.
- Government of Jordan, Department of Statistics (1964). First Census of Population and Housing. Volume I: Final Tables; General Characteristics of the Population (PDF).
- Government of Palestine, Department of Statistics (1945). Village Statistics, April, 1945.
- Guérin, V. (1875). Description Géographique Historique et Archéologique de la Palestine (in French). Vol. 2: Samarie, pt. 2. Paris: L'Imprimerie Nationale.
- Hadawi, S. (1970). Village Statistics of 1945: A Classification of Land and Area ownership in Palestine. Palestine Liberation Organization Research Center.
- Hütteroth, W.-D.; Abdulfattah, K. (1977). Historical Geography of Palestine, Transjordan and Southern Syria in the Late 16th Century. Erlanger Geographische Arbeiten, Sonderband 5. Erlangen, Germany: Vorstand der Fränkischen Geographischen Gesellschaft. ISBN 3-920405-41-2.
- Le Strange, G. (1890). Palestine Under the Moslems: A Description of Syria and the Holy Land from A.D. 650 to 1500. Committee of the Palestine Exploration Fund.
- Macalister, R.A. Stewart; Masterman, E.W.G. (1905). "Occasional Papers on the Modern inhabitants of Palestine, part I & part II". Quarterly Statement - Palestine Exploration Fund. 37: 343–356. doi:10.1179/peq.1905.37.4.343. S2CID 161632875.
- Meri, J.W. (2002). The Cult of Saints among Muslims and Jews in Medieval Syria. Oxford University Press. ISBN 978-0-19-155473-5.
- Mills, E., ed. (1932). Census of Palestine 1931. Population of Villages, Towns and Administrative Areas. Jerusalem: Government of Palestine.
- Palmer, E.H. (1881). The Survey of Western Palestine: Arabic and English Name Lists Collected During the Survey by Lieutenants Conder and Kitchener, R. E. Transliterated and Explained by E.H. Palmer. Committee of the Palestine Exploration Fund.
- Robinson, E.; Smith, E. (1841). Biblical Researches in Palestine, Mount Sinai and Arabia Petraea: A Journal of Travels in the year 1838. Vol. 3. Boston: Crocker & Brewster.
- Röhricht, R. (1893). (RRH) Regesta regni Hierosolymitani (MXCVII-MCCXCI) (in Latin). Berlin: Libraria Academica Wageriana.
- Talmon-Heller, Daniella (1994). "Popular Hanbalite Islam in 12th-13th Century Jabal Nablus and Jabal Qasyūn". Studia Islamica. 79: 103–120. doi:10.2307/1595838. JSTOR 1595838.
- Talmon-Heller, Daniella (2002). Riley-Smith, J. (ed.). The Cited Tales of the Wondrous Doings of the Shaykhs of the Holy Land. Vol. 1. published in Crusades. Aldershot, Hampshire: Published by Ashgate for the Society for the Study of the Crusades and the Latin East. pp. 111–154. ISBN 0754609189.
