= Kfar Tapuach =

Israeli settlement in the West Bank

Kfar Tapuach: כפר תפוח (Hebrew)
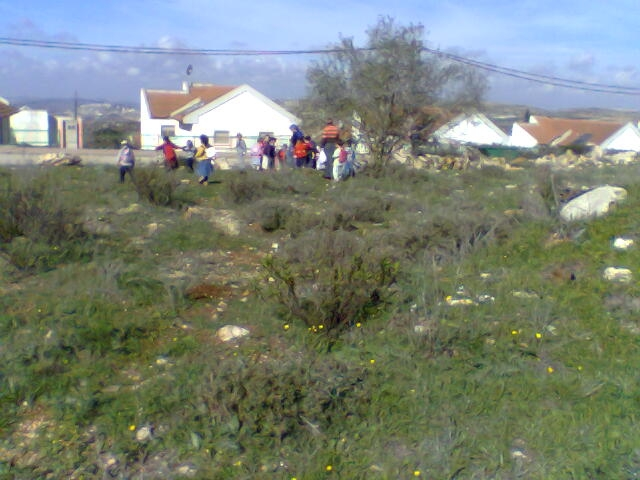

- Kfar Tapuach Logo
- Etymology: Apple Village
- Location within the Northern West Bank
- Coordinates: 32°7′5″N 35°15′0″E
- Country: Palestine
- District: Judea and Samaria Area
- Council: Shomron
- Region: West Bank
- Affiliation: Hapoel HaMizrachi
- Founded: 1978
- Founder: The Jewish Agency
- Population (2024): 1,605

Kfar Tapuach (Hebrew: כְּפַר תַּפּוּחַ, lit., Apple-village) is an Orthodox Jewish Israeli settlement in the West Bank, founded in 1978. It sits astride Tapuach Junction, one of the major traffic junctions in the West Bank. The executive director of the village council is Yisrael Blunder, and the chief rabbi is Shimon Rosenzwieg. In 2024, it had a population of 1,605.

The international community considers Israeli settlements in the West Bank illegal under international law, but the Israeli government disputes this.

== History ==
According to ARIJ, Kfar Tapuach was established in 1978 on land which Israel had confiscated from the Palestinian town of Yasuf.

== Demographics ==
Although its population consists entirely of Jews, Kfar Tapuach is one of the more diverse Israeli settlements, with its population coming from a range of backgrounds. Founded by a core of Habbani Yemenite Jews from the moshav of Bareket, it has since absorbed Jewish immigrants from Russia and the United States, a large group of Peruvian converts to Judaism from Trujillo, Peru, and others. Between February 2004 and August 2009, over 90 new families moved to Kfar Tapuach.

== Public services ==
The settlement includes four synagogues, two mikvaot (ritual baths) for women and men, a nursery school, and three kindergartens.

== Biblical Tappuah ==
Kfar Tapuach is named after biblical Tapuach (Tappuah or Tapuah), which appears in the Bible in the Book of Joshua (Joshua 12:17) as one of the first 31 cities conquered by Joshua Bin-Nun and the children of Israel.

== Kahanism ==
Kfar Tapuach is noted for its concentration of followers of the assassinated rabbi Meir Kahane, who was convicted of multiple acts of terrorism in the United States and in Israel.

== See also ==
- Binyamin Ze'ev Kahane
- David Ha'ivri
- Kahanism
- Meir Kahane
- Mike Guzovsky
- Eden Natan-Zada
- 2010 Tapuah Junction stabbing
- 2013 Tapuah Junction stabbing
