= Diya' al-Din al-Maqdisi =

Hanbali Islamic scholar (1173–1245)

- Title: ضياء الدين المقدسي

Personal life
- Born: 1173
- Died: 1245 (aged 71–72)
- Era: Islamic golden age
- Notable work: Al-Āḥādith al-Jiyād al-Mukhtārah min mā laysa fī Ṣaḥīḥain

Religious life
- Religion: Islam
- School: Hanbali
- Creed: Athari

Muslim leader
- Influenced by: Abu-al-Faraj Ibn Al-Jawzi d 597 AH

Ḍiyā’ al-Dīn Abu ‘Abdallah Muhammad ibn ‘Abd al-Wahid al-Sa‘di al-Hanbali (Arabic: ضياء الدين المقدسي) (AH 569–643; AD 1173−1245) was a Hanbali Islamic scholar.

== Biography ==
Diya' al-Din was born in Damascus in 1173. His parents had emigrated from Nablus in the crusader Kingdom of Jerusalem shortly before his birth, along with 155 of other Hanbali inhabitants of the area, in response to perceived threats against their shaykhs from the crusader lord of Nablus, Baldwin of Ibelin. Al-Dhahabi described him as the Sheikh of hadith scholars. He recorded Maqdisi's death in the year 1245 CE, AH 643.

He was a relative of Abd al-Ghani al-Maqdisi, as his grandmother and Abd al-Ghani al-Maqdisi's mother were sisters, while Ibn Qudamah was his maternal uncle.

== Works ==
- Talmon-Heller, Daniella (2002). Riley-Smith, Jonathan Simon Christopher (ed.). The Cited Tales of the Wondrous Doings of the Shaykhs of the Holy Land. Vol. 1. published in Crusades. Aldershot, Hampshire: Published by Ashgate for the Society for the Study of the Crusades and the Latin East. pp. 111–154. ISBN 0754609189. : a collection of anecdotes about the shaykhs of the Nablus area prior to the mass immigration of Hanbalis to Damascus. Diya al-Din collected the stories from his older relatives who had also lived there
- Al-Āhādith al-Jiyād al-Mukhtārah min mā laysa fī Ṣaḥīḥain: a collection of hadith arranged by the name of the Companion narrating each hadith, in alphabetical order. He was unable to complete it. He intended to include only authentic hadith a goal which, to a large extent, he accomplished.
- A short treatise, Ikhtisās al-Qurʾān Bi ʿAwdihī ilā al-Rahīm al-Rahmān, a book bringing together the ahādīth and narrations pertaining to the Qur'an being erased from this Earth and returning to Allāh.
- As-Sunan wal-Ahkam `un il-Mustafa Alaihi Afdal us-Salati was-Salam
- Fada'il Al A'amaal: a collection of hadith highlighting the virtues of various actions, such as prayer, fasting, charity, and visiting the sick. His book is not to be confused with the similarly titled Fazail-e-Amaal by Zakariyya Kandhlawi.
- Al-Rowā 'n Muslim
- Fḍā'il Al-Quran
- Al-'Dat Li Al-Karb wal-Ālshida
- Fḍā'il Ālʿmāl
- Manāqib Al-Shikeh Abī Omr Al-Maqdsī
- Min Manāqib Ja'far Ibnu Abī ṭālb
- Al-nāhī 'n sb Li Al-Aṣḥāb
- Al-Nāsīha

== See also ==
- Hanbali (nesbat), disambiguation page listing other uses of Hanbali as a nisba (nesbat)
- Maqdisi (nesbat), describing this nisba (onomastics)

== Bibliography ==
- Drory, Joseph (1988). "Hanbalis of the Nablus Region in the Eleventh and Twelfth Centuries". Asian and African Studies. 22: 93–112.
- Talmon-Heller, Daniella (1994). "Popular Hanbalite Islam in 12th–13th Century Jabal Nablus and Jabal Qasyūn". Studia Islamica. 79: 103–120. doi:10.2307/1595838. JSTOR 1595838.
