= Kifl Haris =

Municipality type D in Salfit, Palestine

- Municipality type D (Village council)

Arabic transcription(s)
  - Arabic: كفل حارس
  - Latin: Kifl Hares (official); Kefl Harith (unofficial)
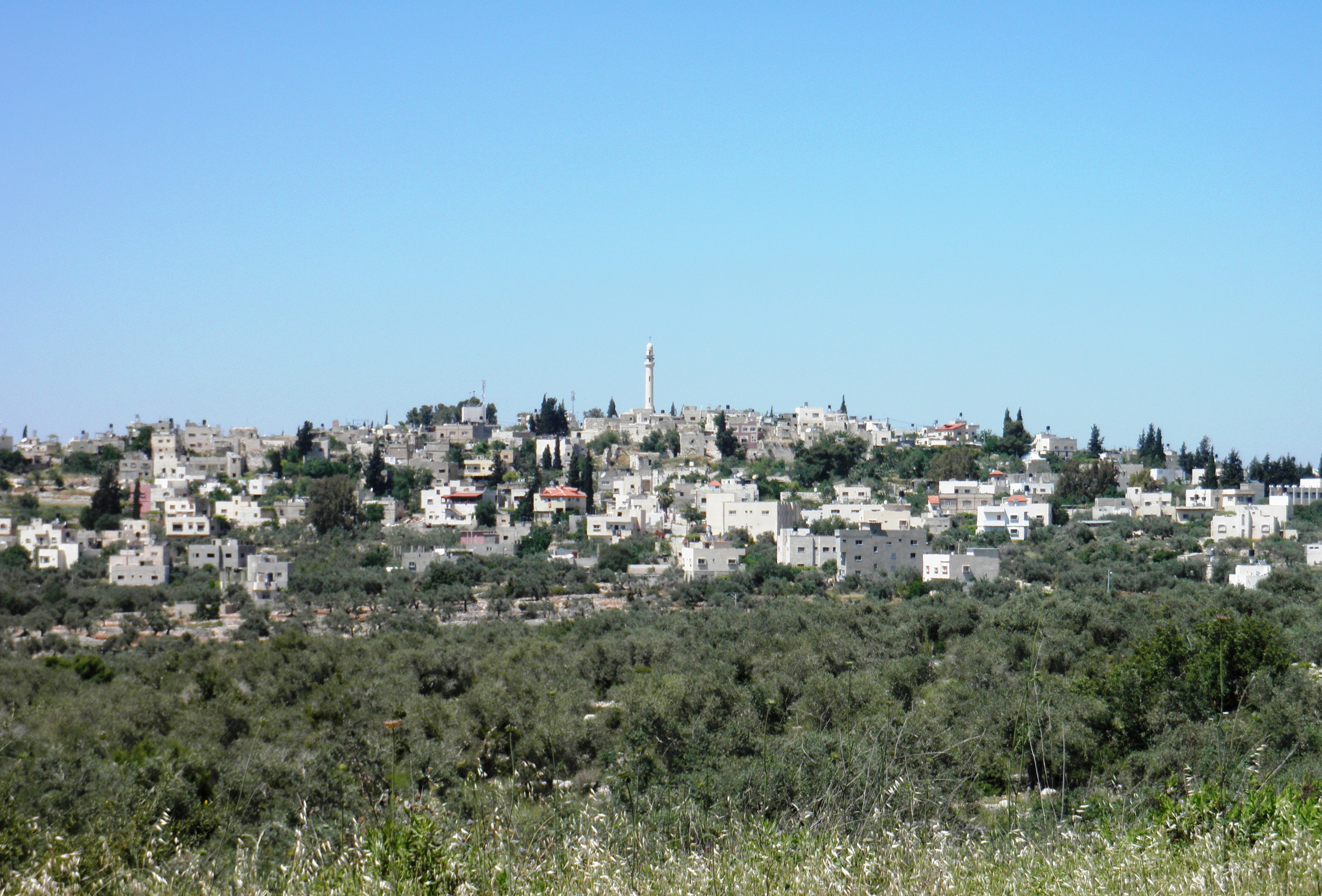
- View of Kifl Hares, 2011

- Location of Kifl Haris within Palestine
- Coordinates: 32°07′07″N 35°09′25″E
- Palestine grid: 165/169
- State: Palestine
- Governorate: Salfit

Government
  - Type: Village council
  - Head of Municipality: Ahmad Buziah

Population (2017)
  - Total: 4,084
- Name meaning: "The village of the guard"

Kifl Haris (Arabic: كفل حارس) is a Palestinian village in the northern West Bank, located six kilometers west of Salfit and 18 kilometers south of Nablus, in Salfit Governorate, Palestine; it is located northwest of the Israeli settlement of Ariel.

== History ==
Sherds from the Middle Bronze Age, Iron Age II, Persian, Hellenistic, Roman, Byzantine/Umayyad, Crusader/Ayyubid and Mamluk eras have been found here.

=== Ottoman era ===
In 1517 the village was incorporated into the Ottoman Empire after it defeated the Mamluk Empire, and in 1596, Kafr Harit appeared in Ottoman tax registers as being in nahiya (subdistrict) of Jabal Qubal, part of the Sanjak of Nablus. It had a population of 54 households, all Muslim. They paid taxes on occasional revenues, goats and/or beehives, and a fixed amount; a total of 22,500 akçe. Sherds from the early Ottoman era have also been found here.

In the 18th and 19th centuries the village formed part of the highland region known as Jūrat ‘Amra or Bilād Jammā‘īn. Situated between Dayr Ghassāna in the south and the present Route 5 in the north, and between Majdal Yābā in the west and Jammā‘īn, Mardā and Kifl Ḥāris in the east, this area served, according to historian Roy Marom, "as a buffer zone between the political-economic-social units of the Jerusalem and the Nablus regions. On the political level, it suffered from instability due to the migration of the Bedouin tribes and the constant competition among local clans for the right to collect taxes on behalf of the Ottoman authorities."

In 1838 Edward Robinson noted it as a village, Kefr Harith, in the Jurat Merda district, south of Nablus.

In 1870 Victor Guérin reached the village, after walking through "beautiful plantations of figs and olives". He estimated it had 600 inhabitants. The name of this place was given to Guérin as Kefil Haris. The Wely marked on the Palestine Exploration Fund 1880s map as Sheikh Ata, 1 mile north-east of Kefr Haris, is called by him Sheikh Khather. He also calls attention to the remains of an old watchtower built of large, well-cut stones, between Deir Estia and Kefr Haris. At the latter place he found two broken marble columns built up in the wall of the mosque.

In 1870/1871 (1288 AH) an Ottoman census listed the village in the nahiya (sub-district) of Jamma'in al-Thani, subordinate to Nablus.

In 1882 PEF's Survey of Western Palestine described Kifl Haris as a "somewhat small village on high ground, with olive groves to the east. It has three sacred places, Neby Kifl, Neby Nun, and Neby Lusha."

=== British Mandate of Palestine era ===
In the 1922 census of Palestine conducted by the British Mandate authorities, Kufr Hares had a population of 373, all Muslim, increasing in the 1931 census to 562 persons, still all Muslim, in 130 houses.

In the 1945 statistics the population was 770 Muslims while the total land area was 9,393 dunams, according to an official land and population survey. Of this, 4,117 were allocated for plantations and irrigable land, 2,131 for cereals, while 32 dunams were classified as built-up areas.

=== Jordanian era ===
In the wake of the 1948 Arab–Israeli War, and after the 1949 Armistice Agreements, Kifl Haris came under Jordanian rule.

In 1961 the population was 1,341.

=== post-1967 ===
Since the Six-Day War in 1967, Kifl Haris has been under Israeli occupation. Visits by Jewish pilgrims to Kifl Hares are coordinated by the Israeli military.

On 29 May 1989 a large group of Israeli civilians from Joseph's Tomb Yeshiva arrived in Kifl Haris shooting guns randomly. Ibtisan Abdul Rachman Busia, aged 16, was shot dead and two others injured. Two donkeys were killed. Israeli Police detained a number of suspects.

== "Tomb of Joshua" and other shrines ==
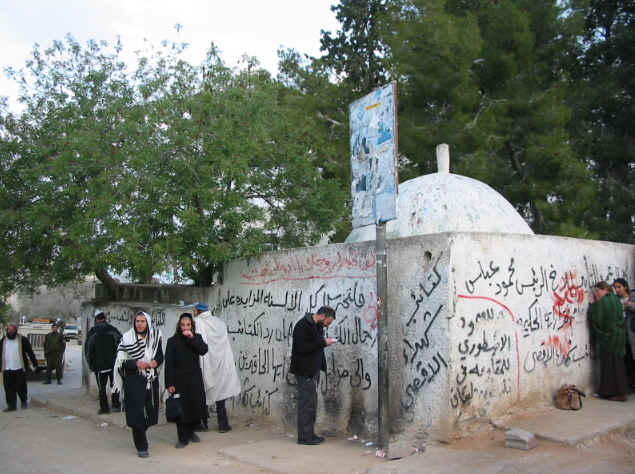
Tomb of Joshua

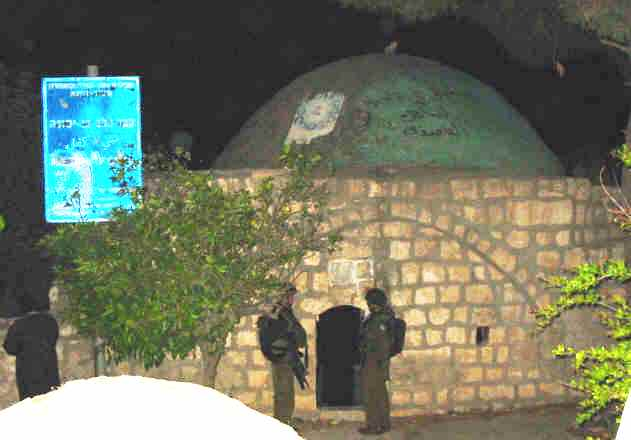
Tomb of Caleb

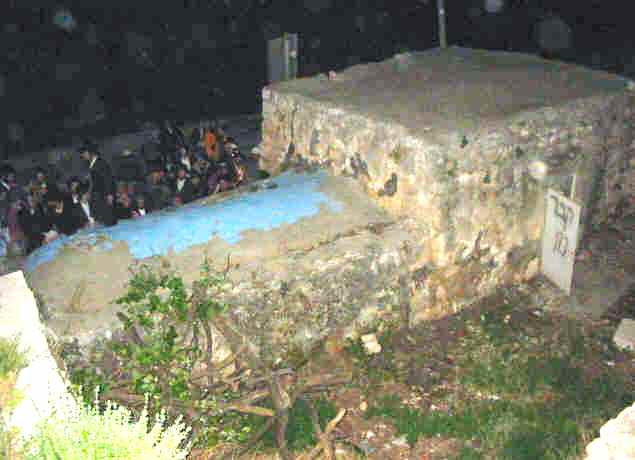
Tomb of Nun

According to Joshua 24:30, Joshua was buried in Timnath-serah, which is considered by Orthodox Jews to be the current location of Kifl Haris, where a Jewish tradition also places the tombs of Caleb and Nun. Thousands make the pilgrimage to the tombs on the annual commemoration of Joshua's death, 26th of Nisan on the Hebrew calendar.

According to a Samaritan tradition, noted in 1877, the tombs of Joshua and Caleb were in Kifl Haris.

The mausoleum at Kifl Haris seen by Jews as the Tomb of Joshua, is known to Muslims as the Maqam of Yusha' ibn Nun (مقام يوشع بن نون; Shrine of Joshua, son of Nun) and as the Maqam of the Servant of Salah ad-Din (Arabic: مقام خادم صلاح الدين; Shrine of the Servant of Saladin). The current structure of the Shrine of Joshua is known to be an Islamic shrine built by Sultan Saladin, which contained on its wall an inscribed plaque stating that "Jawhar bin Abdullah is one of the servants of the shrine." About this man, Palestinian historian Murad Mustafa Dabbagh wrote in his work Biladuna Filastin (Our Country Palestine; 1965) that he performed the pilgrimage on behalf of his master, the martyr Najm al-Din Ayyub, son of Sultan Al-Adil I, and that the Hajj took place in the year 610 AH (1213/14 CE), which places him and the time the shrine was built during the Ayyubid period.

The shrine considered by Jews to be the tomb of Caleb is seen by Muslims to be the maqam of Prophet Dhu al-Kifl, from whom they consider the first part of the town's name to be derived.

The third holy structure in Kifl Haris, standing at some distance in the southwest of the town, is a large open shrine dedicated to Prophet Dhul-Nun, identified with Yunus (Jonah). Jews see in it the tomb of Nun, the father of Joshua.

Wafa Palestine News Agency reports that after the 1967 Six-Day War, the village shrines became a religious destination for Jews, with visits increasingly taking a political and Judaizing character.

In 2023 the tomb was vandalized with antisemitic phrases and messages supporting the 2023 Hamas-led attack on Israel, including the phrase "Death to the Jews," names of terrorists, and endorsement for Palestinian Islamic Jihad. A few days later, members of the Samaria Regional Council and IDF soldiers restored the tomb.

== Israeli–Palestinian conflict ==
According to the United Nations OCHA, three local residents were killed during the First Intifada and one during the Second Intifada.

42% of the village land is classified as Area B land, while the remainder 58% is Area C. Israel has confiscated 361 dunams of land from Kifl Haris to establish the Israeli settlement of Ariel.

On 14 March 2013 Adele Biton was critically injured (later dying from her injuries), and her mother and two sisters were moderately injured, after their car crashed after Palestinians threw stones their way near the village. Five youths from Kifl Haris were charged by a military court for responsibility for the incident, and as of February 2015 the case has not yet been concluded.

In June 2014 Jamil Ali Abed Jabir died during a night raid by the Israeli army. Locals say he suffered a heart attack while defending his home. According to an Israeli army spokesman, his house wasn't raided.

In 2015 an Israeli tour of the site was preceded by a convoy of military vehicles which closed off the town entrances and imposed a shutdown of all the village shops so Israeli tourists could visit the tomb for several hours.

== Demography ==
=== Local origins ===
According to David Grossman (geographer), Kifl Haris' residents came from various locations, including Ein Siniya (near Ramallah), Jindas (a former village near Lod), and the Hauran region (in what is today northern Jordan and southwestern Syria).

== See also ==
- Khirbet Tibnah, another place with a Tomb of Joshua

== Bibliography ==
- Barron, J.B., ed. (1923). Palestine: Report and General Abstracts of the Census of 1922. Government of Palestine.
- Conder, C.R.; Kitchener, H.H. (1882). The Survey of Western Palestine: Memoirs of the Topography, Orography, Hydrography, and Archaeology. Vol. 2. London: Committee of the Palestine Exploration Fund.
- Finkelstein, I.; Lederman, Zvi, eds. (1997). Highlands of many cultures. Tel Aviv: Institute of Archaeology of Tel Aviv University Publications Section. ISBN 965-440-007-3.
- Government of Jordan, Department of Statistics (1964). First Census of Population and Housing. Volume I: Final Tables; General Characteristics of the Population (PDF).
- Government of Palestine, Department of Statistics (1945). Village Statistics, April, 1945.
- Guérin, V. (1875). Description Géographique Historique et Archéologique de la Palestine (in French). Vol. 2: Samarie, pt. 2. Paris: L'Imprimerie Nationale.
- Hadawi, S. (1970). Village Statistics of 1945: A Classification of Land and Area ownership in Palestine. Palestine Liberation Organization Research Center.
- Hütteroth, W.-D.; Abdulfattah, K. (1977). Historical Geography of Palestine, Transjordan and Southern Syria in the Late 16th Century. Erlanger Geographische Arbeiten, Sonderband 5. Erlangen, Germany: Vorstand der Fränkischen Geographischen Gesellschaft. ISBN 3-920405-41-2.
- Mills, E., ed. (1932). Census of Palestine 1931. Population of Villages, Towns and Administrative Areas. Jerusalem: Government of Palestine.
- Palmer, E.H. (1881). The Survey of Western Palestine: Arabic and English Name Lists Collected During the Survey by Lieutenants Conder and Kitchener, R. E. Transliterated and Explained by E.H. Palmer. Committee of the Palestine Exploration Fund.
- Robinson, E.; Smith, E. (1841). Biblical Researches in Palestine, Mount Sinai and Arabia Petraea: A Journal of Travels in the year 1838. Vol. 3. Boston: Crocker & Brewster.
