= Ronnie Ellenblum =

Israeli geographer (1952–2021)

Ronnie Ellenblum (Hebrew: רוני אלנבלום; born June 21, 1952, Haifa, Israel; died January 7, 2021, Jerusalem, Israel) was an Israeli professor at the department of geography at the Hebrew University of Jerusalem, and a member of the Israel Academy of Sciences and Humanities, specializing in Medieval geographies, the history of the Levant in the Middle Ages, and the history of the Crusades. His latest studies deal also with environmental and climatic history, the history of Jerusalem, and the development of historic cities in general. Ellenblum headed the Vadum Iacob Research Project and was involved in the creation of several databases dealing with the history of Jerusalem (together with al-Quds University); with the maps of Jerusalem and with English translations of documents and charters of the Crusader Period. Ellenblum has developed a comprehensive theoretical approach to 'Fragility,' claiming that a decade or two of climatic disturbance (droughts, untimely rains and severely cold winters) could lead to severe societal effects, and that the amelioration and even stabilization of climatic conditions for several decades can lead to a period of affluence. His theory of Fragility is based on a thorough reading of a wealth of well-dated textual and archaeological evidence, pointing to periods of collapse (in the eastern Mediterranean and northern China during the Medieval Climate Anomaly), and affluence in the entire Mediterranean Basin during the Roman Optimum, and describing these processes yearly, monthly and even daily.

== Book publications ==
- Frankish Rural Settlement in the Latin Kingdom of Jerusalem, Cambridge University Press, 1998
- Crusader castles and modern histories Cambridge, Cambridge University Press, 2007
- Frankish Castles, Muslim Castles, and the Medieval Citadel of Jerusalem. In In laudem Hierosolymitani: Studies in Crusades and Medieval Culture in Honor of Benjamin Z. Kedar, edited by Iris Shagrir, Ronnie Ellenblum and Jonathan Riley-Smith. Aldershot: Ashgate, 2007
- The Collapse of the Eastern Mediterranean: Climate Change and the Decline of the East, 950–1072, Cambridge University Press, 2012
