= 2012–13 Palestinian local elections =

Election in the Palestinian territories

Local elections were held in the Palestinian territories on 20 October 2012, with a second part to be held on 24 November 2012. A total of 245 village councils, 98 municipal councils and 10 local councils would be elected.

== Background ==
Local elections had originally been scheduled for 17 July 2010. However, the Central Election Commission was unable to operate in the Hamas-controlled Gaza Strip, resulting in the Palestinian government announcing on 25 April that the elections would be postponed in the Strip. On 10 June 2010 the government announced that all local elections were cancelled.

As a result of the cancellation, several lawsuits were filed against the government. On 13 December the High Court ruled that cancelling the elections was illegal. The government subsequently announced that local elections would be held in 2011. They were originally scheduled for 9 July, before being postponed until 22 October due to the political split between the West Bank controlled by Fatah and the Gaza Strip controlled by Hamas. However, in August 2011, they were postponed indefinitely.

On 10 July 2012 the government announced that local elections would be held on 20 October.

== Elections ==
Local elections were held in the West Bank on 20 October 2012, with a second part to be held on 24 November 2012. Fatah claimed victory after Hamas withdraw from elections.

voting took place in only 92 of the West Bank's 353 municipalities. More than 80 villages were unable to produce candidate lists(a symptom, Hamas claims, of Fatah intimidation). In a further 181 districts, only one candidate list was registered rendering polling unnecessary. With 54.8 per cent of those eligible to vote turned out to cast their ballot

Ms Nour Odeh, a spokesperson for the Palestinian Authority said "We are still hoping that elections will be held in Gaza. A person's right to vote cannot be held hostage to any political faction,".

Hamas Government in Gaza has refused to recognise the election "as a legitimate expression of the Palestinian peoples' will." The Palestinian Centre for Human Rights also questioned the legitimacy of the polls, "in light of the limiting of public freedoms and continuing widespread violations of human rights by the PA."

== Results ==
=== Jerusalem Governorate ===
==== Abu Dis ====
Local Authority	Abu Dis	Governorate	Jerusalem
Eligible voters	5,241	Participation	52.15%
List		Votes	Seats
Independence and Development	Fatah	1,288	6
Late Salah Eyad	DFLP	786	4
Youth of Change	Alliance (PFLP, PPSF, PNI)	524	3

==== Biddu ====
Local Authority	Biddu	Governorate	Jerusalem
Eligible voters	3,253	Participation	61.05%
List		Votes	Seats
Fatherland and Construction	Alliance	1,001	6
Biddu First	Independent	517	3
Bloc "Loyalty to the Independent Fatherland"	Independent	367	2

=== Jenin Governorate ===
==== Ajjah ====
Local Authority	Ajjah	Governorate	Jenin
Eligible voters	2,876	Participation	69.74%
List		Votes	Seats
Independence and Development	Fatah	1,210	6
Ajjah Bloc for Development	Independent	503	2
Justice and Equality	DFLP	206	1

==== Al-Yamun ====
Local Authority	Al-Yamun	Governorate	Jenin
Eligible voters	1,444	Participation	19.75%
List		Votes	Seats
Independence and Development	Fatah	671	8
Loyalty to Al-Aqsa	Independent	550	7

==== 'Anin ====
Local Authority	'Anin	Governorate	Jenin
Eligible voters	1,900	Participation	66.26%
List		Votes	Seats
United	Alliance	733	7
Fatherland	PPP	486	4

==== Araqah ====
Local Authority	Araqah	Governorate	Jenin
Eligible voters	1,011	Participation	66.07%
List		Votes	Seats
Sons of Araqah - Covenant and Loyalty List	Independent	435	6
Generosity Without Limits	Independent	195	3

==== Arraba ====
Local Authority	Arraba	Governorate	Jenin
Eligible voters	5,280	Participation	63.86%
List		Votes	Seats
Return	Alliance	1,582	7
Arraba for All	Independent	1,561	6

==== Bir al-Basha ====
Local Authority	Bir al-Basha	Governorate	Jenin
Eligible voters	624	Participation	77.88%
List		Votes	Seats
Jerusalem and Return	Independent	292	6
Bir al-Basha for All	DFLP	132	3

==== Burqin ====
Local Authority	Burqin	Governorate	Jenin
Eligible voters	1,787	Participation	63.64%
List		Votes	Seats
Independence and Development	Fatah	1,011	8
Burqin for All	DFLP	663	5

==== Fandaqumiya ====
Local Authority	Fandaqumiya	Governorate	Jenin
Eligible voters	1,638	Participation	72.71%
List		Votes	Seats
Independence and Development	Fatah	575	4
Fandaqumiya First	Independent	321	3
Our Country	DFLP	144	1
Fatherland	PPP	98	1

==== Jaba ====
Local Authority	Jaba	Governorate	Jenin
Eligible voters	4,297	Participation	41.57%
List		Votes	Seats
Independence and Development	Fatah	1,314	10
Development and Construction	DFLP	410	3

==== Jenin ====
Local Authority	Jenin	Governorate	Jenin
Eligible voters	17,318	Participation	44.12%
List		Votes	Seats
Worthy Jenin	Independent	3,867	8
Independence and Development	Alliance	2,312	5
Jenin for All	PFLP	707	2
National Initiative and Independents	PNI	434	0

==== Qabatiya ====
Local Authority	Qabatiya	Governorate	Jenin
Eligible voters	8,636	Participation	56.11%
List		Votes	Seats
Independence and Development	Fatah	2,631	10
United Qabatiya	Independent	1,433	5
Youth Bloc for Development and Growth	DFLP	281	0

==== Raba ====
Local Authority	Raba	Governorate	Jenin
Eligible voters	1,754	Participation	78.96%
List		Votes	Seats
Independence and Development	Fatah	695	5
Raba for All	Independent	574	4

==== Rummanah ====
Local Authority	Rummanah	Governorate	Jenin
Eligible voters	1,784	Participation	61.10%
List		Votes	Seats
Independence and Development	Fatah	789	9
Palestinian National Initiative	PNI	211	2

==== Silat ad-Dhahr ====
Local Authority	Silat ad-Dhahr	Governorate	Jenin
Eligible voters	2,905	Participation	59.10%
List		Votes	Seats
Independence and Development	Fatah	1,116	8
Fatherland	PPP	424	3
Progress and Prosperity	DFLP	97	0

==== Zababdeh ====
Local Authority	Zababdeh	Governorate	Jenin
Eligible voters	2,121	Participation	76.85%
List		Votes	Seats
Construction and Development	Independent	655	4
National Zababdeh	Independent	501	3
United Zababdeh	Independent	421	2

=== Tulkarm Governorate ===
==== Attil ====
Local Authority	Attil	Governorate	Tulkarm
Eligible voters	5,292	Participation	62.66%
List		Votes	Seats
Independence and Development	Fatah	1,642	6
Construction and Development	Independent	913	3
Unity	Independent	630	2

==== Bal'a ====
Local Authority	Bal'a	Governorate	Tulkarm
Eligible voters	3,706	Participation	73.21%
List		Votes	Seats
Bal'a for All	Independent	1,222	5
Sons of the Land Hand in Hand	Independent	1,045	4
Wafa	Independent	354	2

==== Baqa ash-Sharqiyya ====
Local Authority	Baqa ash-Sharqiyya and Nazlat	Governorate	Tulkarm
Eligible voters	4,650	Participation	76.92%
List		Votes	Seats
Unity		1,240	4
Independence and Development	Fatah	794	3
Construction and Development	Independent	401	1
Sons of the Land	Independent	368	1
Fatherland	PPP	335	1
Country for All	Independent	333	1

==== Beit Lid ====
Local Authority	Beit Lid	Governorate	Tulkarm
Eligible voters	3,475	Participation	73.41%
List		Votes	Seats
Independence and Development	Fatah	1,632	7
Competencies of Beit Lid	Independent	788	4

==== Deir al-Ghusun ====
Local Authority	Deir al-Ghusun	Governorate	Tulkarm
Eligible voters	4,987	Participation	72.65%
List		Votes	Seats
Independence and Development	Fatah	670	3
Brotherhood	Independent	518	2
Our Country	Independent	501	2
Ghusun Bloc	Independent	386	2
Freedom	Independent	325	2
Democratic Change	DFLP	318	1
Deir al-Ghusun for All	Alliance	309	1
Representation of the Fatherland	Alliance	187	0
Fatherland	PPP	176	0

==== Tulkarm ====
Local Authority	Tulkarm	Governorate	Tulkarm
Eligible voters	27,350	Participation	56.82%
List		Votes	Seats
Independence and Development	Fatah, DFLP	7,869	8
Independents	Independent	2,425	3
Fatherland	Fatherland Movement	2,232	2
Our Country	Alliance (PFLP, PPP, PNI, independents)	1,797	2
Tulkarm for All	PPSF	612	0

==== Zeita ====
Local Authority	Zeita	Governorate	Tulkarm
Eligible voters	1,805	Participation	75.57%
List		Votes	Seats
United Zeita List	Independent	529	4
Independence and Development	Fatah	415	3
The Right	Independent	207	1
We are all Zeita	Independent	127	1

=== Elections by Acclamation ===
Elections by Acclamation
Governorate	Local Authority	List	
Jerusalem	Jib	National Unity	Alliance
Jerusalem	Al-Ram	Martyr Tal'at Ramih List - Al-Ram for All	Alliance
Jerusalem	As-Sawahira ash-Sharqiya	Martyr Yasser Arafat Bloc	Alliance
Jerusalem	Ash-Sheikh Sa'd	Independence and Development	Fatah
Jerusalem	Al-Eizariya	Independence and Development	Fatah
Jerusalem	Al-Qubeiba	Independence and Development	Alliance
Jerusalem	Nabi Samwil	Independence and Development	Fatah
Jerusalem	Beit Ijza	Independence and Development	Fatah
Jerusalem	Beit Iksa	Independence and Development	Fatah
Jerusalem	Beit Hanina al-Balad	Sons of the Land	Independent
Jerusalem	Beit Duqqu	Independence and Development	Fatah
Jerusalem	Beit Surik	Independence and Development	Fatah
Jerusalem	Beit 'Anan	National Unity and Development	Alliance
Jerusalem	Bir Nabala	Independence and Development	Fatah
Jerusalem	Jaba'	Independence and Development	Alliance
Jerusalem	Hizma	Independence and Development	Fatah
Jerusalem	Qatanna	Independence and Development	Fatah
Jerusalem	Kalandia	Independence and Development	Fatah
Jerusalem	Kafr 'Aqab	Independence and Development	Fatah
Jerusalem	Mikhmas	Independence and Development	Fatah
Jenin	Umm ar-Rihan	Independence and Development	Fatah
Jenin	Umm at-Tut	Independence and Development	Fatah
Jenin	Ash-Shuhada	Independence and Development	Fatah
Jenin	At-Tayba	Sons of At-Tayba	Alliance
Jenin	Al-Attara	Independence and Development	Fatah
Jenin	Al-Mughayyir	Independence and Development	Fatah
Jenin	Barta'a ash-Sharqiyyah	Independence and Development	Fatah
Jenin	Ti'inik	Independence and Development	Fatah
Jenin	Telfit	Telfit of Tomorrow	Independent
Jenin	Khirbet Abdallah al-Yunis	Independence and Development	Fatah
Jenin	Zabda Al-Jadida	Independence and Development	Alliance
Jenin	Sanur	Independence and Development	Alliance
Jenin	Silat al-Harithiya	Independence and Development	Fatah
Jenin	Fahma al-Jadida	Independence and Development	Fatah
Jenin	Tura	Independence and Development	
Jenin	Riyadh	Independence and Development	Fatah
Jenin	Rayyan	Independence and Development	Fatah
Jenin	Kafr Dan	Independence and Development	Fatah
Jenin	Kafr Rai	Independence and Development	Alliance
Jenin	Kufeirit	United Kufeirit Bloc	Alliance
Jenin	Misilyah	Independence and Development	Fatah
Jenin	Ya'bad	Independence and Development	Fatah
Tulkarm	Al-Jarushiya	Independence and Development	Fatah
Tulkarm	Saffarin	Independence and Development	Fatah
Tulkarm	Seida	Independence and Development	Fatah
Tulkarm	Shufta	Independence and Development	Fatah
Tulkarm	'Illar	Independence and Development	Fatah
Tulkarm	Anabta	Independence, Development and Construction	Alliance
Tulkarm	Far'un	Independence and Development	Fatah
Tulkarm	Qaffin	Independence and Development	Fatah
Tulkarm	Kafr al-Labad	Kafr al-Labad for All	Independent
