= Highway 60 (Israel–Palestine) =

Road in Israel and Palestine (West Bank)

Coordinates: 31°53′54″N 35°15′55″E

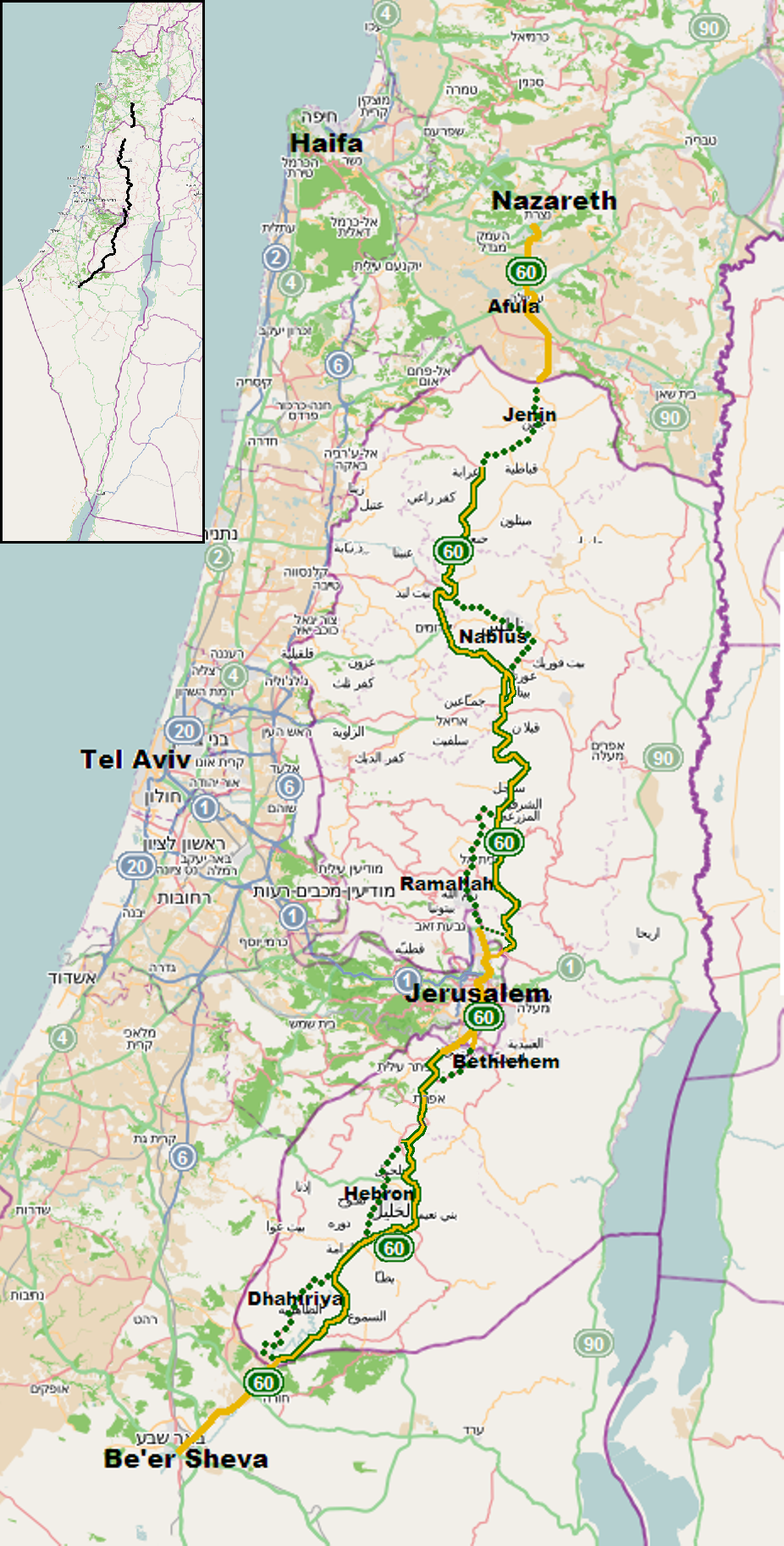

Route information
- Length: 235 km (146 mi)

Major junctions
- South end: Beersheba; Highway 25 (David Hacham Blvd.)
- Hativat HaNegev Junction; Tel Sheva Junction; Shoket Interchange; Shoket Junction; Gush Etzion Junction; HaMinharot Junction; Jaffa Gate Square; Sha'ar Mizrah Interchange; Tapuah Junction; Shomron Junction; Dotan Junction; Yizre'el Junction; Mikhabei Esh Junction; Iksal Interchange
- North end: Nazareth; HaMusachim Junction

Location
- Countries: Israel, Palestine
- Major cities: Beersheba, Hebron, Gush Etzion, Jerusalem, Afula, Nazareth

Highway system

Highway 60 (Hebrew: כביש שישים, Kvish Shishim; Arabic: الطريق السريع ستين at-Tariq as-Sarie Sitiin), officially Bible Road (Hebrew: דרך התנ"ך) is a south–north transnational road in Israel and the Palestinian West Bank that stretches from Beersheba to Nazareth.

== Route and specifics ==
The Highway in large part follows the same general route as the so-called biblical "Way of the Patriarchs" (Hebrew: דרך האבות, romanized: Derech HaAvot), since it also follows the central watershed of the hill country, which figures prominently in the travels of the Biblical patriarchs.

From its junction with Highway 40 in Beersheba to the city's outskirts, Route 60 is a dual carriageway with at-grade intersections. While it continues on to serve as the main north–south artery between Israeli settlements and Palestinian communities such as the cities of Hebron and Bethlehem in the southern West Bank, it is a two-lane, shoulderless road until past Hebron at Gush Etzion Junction, where it regains its lane-separation until short of Bethlehem, that section having recently been widened. Upon entering Jerusalem, its lanes are again mostly separated as it serves as a central artery in the city center. In the northern quarters it becomes a separate grade freeway with multiple interchanges, from where it continues through the central and northern West Bank as a two-lane road, not being divided again until the stretch between Afula and its terminus in downtown Nazareth.

Due to it running through a mainly rural setting, many of the junctions along its route feature hitchhiking posts called trempiadas.

=== Access, bypass roads ===
At present, the highway is non-contiguous pending final status agreement between Israel and the Palestinians. The section through Jenin is closed to yellow (Israeli) license plates. The sections north and south of the West Bank and through Jerusalem are closed to green (Palestinian Authority) license plates. (Note: At the time of its designation, Highway 60 was a consecutive road running from Beersheba to Nazareth. With the outbreak of the Al-Aqsa Intifada, an IDF decree forbade Israelis from traveling on the Tel Dotan-Jenin-Jalamah section, effectively splitting Highway 60. Additionally, the section of the highway within the city limits of Jerusalem are forbidden to green Palestinian license plates. Final designation of the highway is dependent on the final status agreement between Israel and the Palestinians.)

Before the Oslo Accords, Palestinians lived under Israeli authority and could travel freely on the road. After the Palestinian Authority assumed control over various cities, Israel established checkpoints on areas of the route which entered Palestinian jurisdiction. New routes of highway were paved so that Israeli traffic could bypass the Palestinian towns in order to reduce friction. These so-called bypass roads, while a contentious issue in their own right due to the varying levels of limitation on Palestinian access, also served as an improvement to the road which allowed traffic to flow around, rather than through the heart of congested urban areas.

==== Tunnels Highway ====
One of the more sophisticated segments – built on lands east of the Green line set in 1967 – is the stretch known as the Tunnels Highway. Designed by a French firm, the route leads from southern Jerusalem to the Jewish settlements area of Gush Etzion, bypasses Bethlehem and then heading to the northwest using a pair of tunnels; the northern tunnel, called the Gilo tunnel because it is adjacent to the Gilo neighborhood/settlement, is 270 metres long. The second tunnel, called the Refaim tunnel based on the nearby Refaim Valley and passing under Har Gilo and Beit Jala, is 900 m long, making it the longest road tunnel in the West Bank. The tunnels are linked by the West Bank's highest and longest bridge, crossing the Walaja Valley.

In 2024, the project to build a second bridge and tunnel parallel to the first, thus expanding the road to two lanes in each direction, was completed. Construction on widening the roadway to two lanes in each direction south from Jerusalem to Gush Etzion Junction is ongoing.

=== In Jerusalem ===
Within Jerusalem, Highway 60, known by the municipality as the Talpiot–Atarot Axis and often referred to by its official Jerusalem Municipality designation, "Road 1" (not to be confused with National Highway 1), is the central north–south artery running through the city centre. The Jerusalem portion of the road begins at the Tunnels Road (the northern end of the Bethlehem Bypass), passes the edges of Gilo and Beit Safafa, joins the "Hebron Road" (Hebrew: דרך חברון) from Bethlehem and continues northward through Talpiot. This section is divided with multiple lanes and has undergone recent construction to include dedicated bus lanes and infrastructure for its eventual conversion into a line of the Jerusalem Light Rail.

At its junction with David Remez Street, in the Abu Tor neighborhood, Route 60 narrows and descends into the Hinnom Valley, curving around Sultan's Pool directly under Mount Zion. It then ascends as Hativat Yerushalayim Street to intersect with the Jaffa Gate entrance to the Old City of Jerusalem.

From there it runs underneath the Jaffa Gate Square, briefly overlaps Jaffa Road and then enters "HaTsanhanim Tunnel" passing underneath Jerusalem's New Gate. It emerges just west of the Damascus Gate intersecting with Street of the Prophets, again becoming a divided street. This section of the road includes tracks for the now completed Jerusalem Light Rail's red line.

Briefly called Heil HaHandassa Boulevard and then Haim Bar-Lev Boulevard, it continues northward passing Meah Shearim, the American Colony, and French Hill, until Meinertzhagen junction, where it becomes a separate grade freeway. As a freeway, it interchanges with Highway 1 at Sha'ar Mizrah. The freeway then bypasses Shuafat with one of the longest and highest bridges in the country, feeding into Beit Hanina and Pisgat Ze'ev with two more interchanges. It continues as an at-grade road intersecting with Neve Yaakov Blvd and finally exits the city near Kalandia, through the Qalandia checkpoint and into the West Bank, where it continues to the east.

=== Renaming as Bible Road ===
On 18 June 2026, Israel officially renamed the highway as "Bible Road" (Hebrew: דרך התנ"ך). The initiative presents the road as a heritage and tourism route connecting sites associated with biblical narratives, including Jerusalem, Bethlehem, Hebron, Shiloh and Beit El. Reported plans include lookout points, new road signs, digital content and an official website that will consolidate all sites. Supporters of the project have compared the concept to other heritage routes, including Route 66 in the United States.

== Israeli-Palestinian conflict ==
Route 60 was a central scene of violence during the al-Aqsa Intifada, which was in part defined by the thousands of shooting attacks on its Israeli traffic, including hundreds of casualties. The Israeli Army, in response, has fortified various sections with anti-sniper walls and had established checkpoints along the route. The Tunnels Highway came under particularly heavy assault during the shooting on Gilo neighborhood since it lies between Gilo and Beit Jala. The concrete barriers employed on other dangerous stretches of road were too heavy to be supported by the bridge, and so a barrier of bulletproof composite armour similar to that employed on Merkava tanks was constructed.

The road was also the site of terrorist attacks in June and August 2010, and June 2015.

== Junctions and interchanges ==
Traveling south on Route 60 between Nablus and Jerusalem

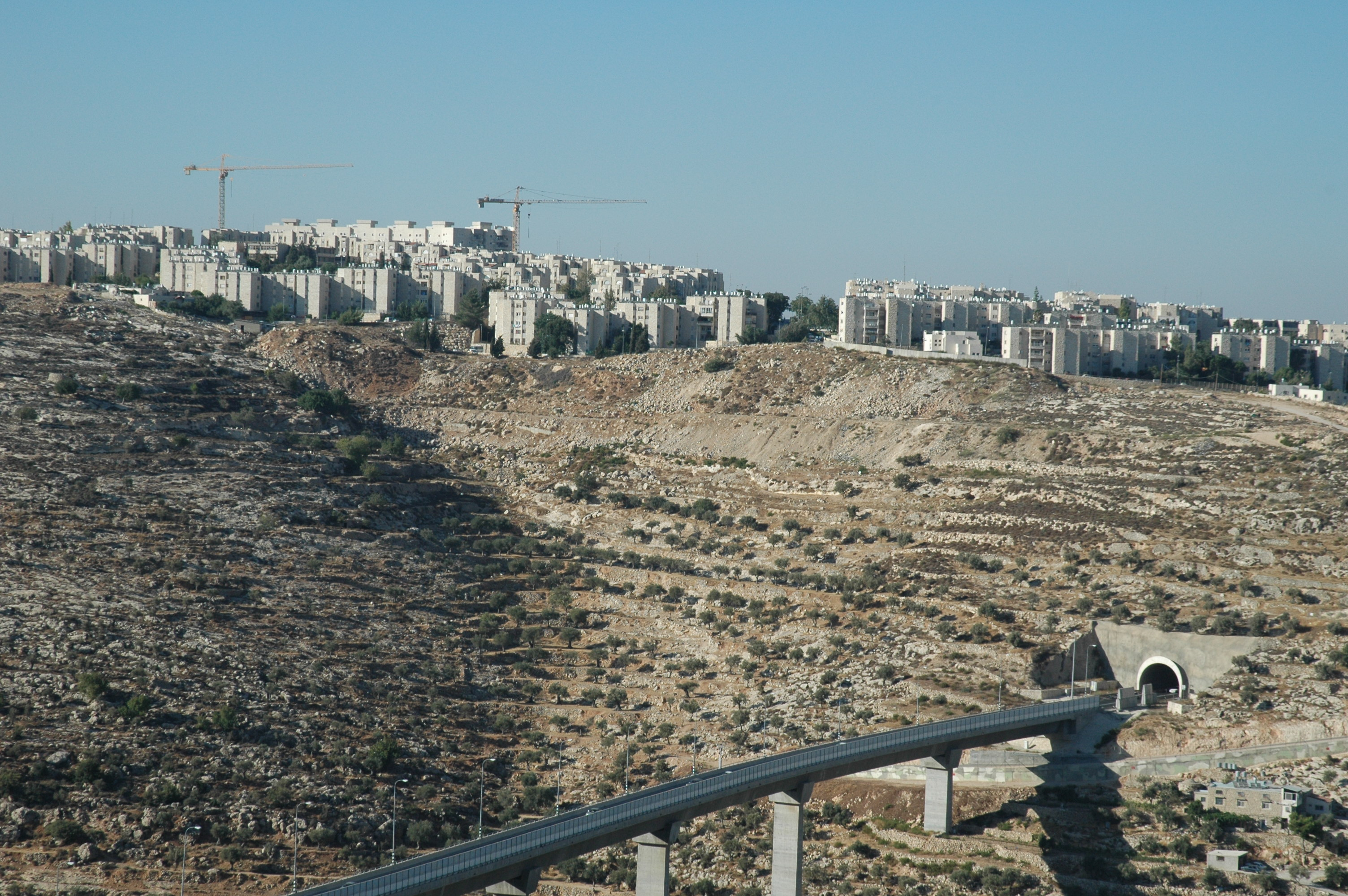
Tunnel (below Gilo) and bridge (above Walaja Valley) to Gush Etzion. Part of the Bethlehem bypass.

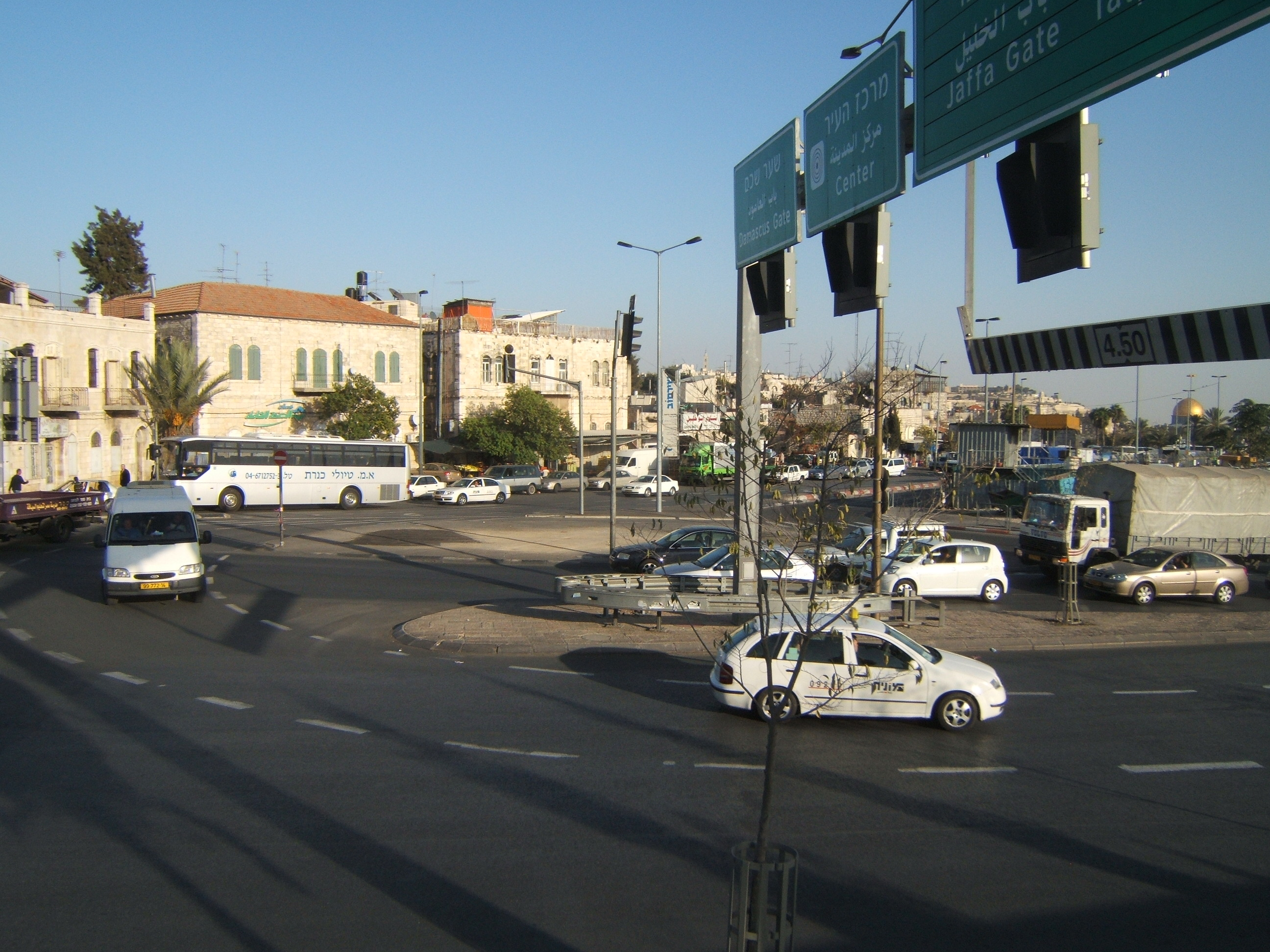
Highway 60 crossing Street of the Prophets. The Dome of the Rock can be seen in the far right background.

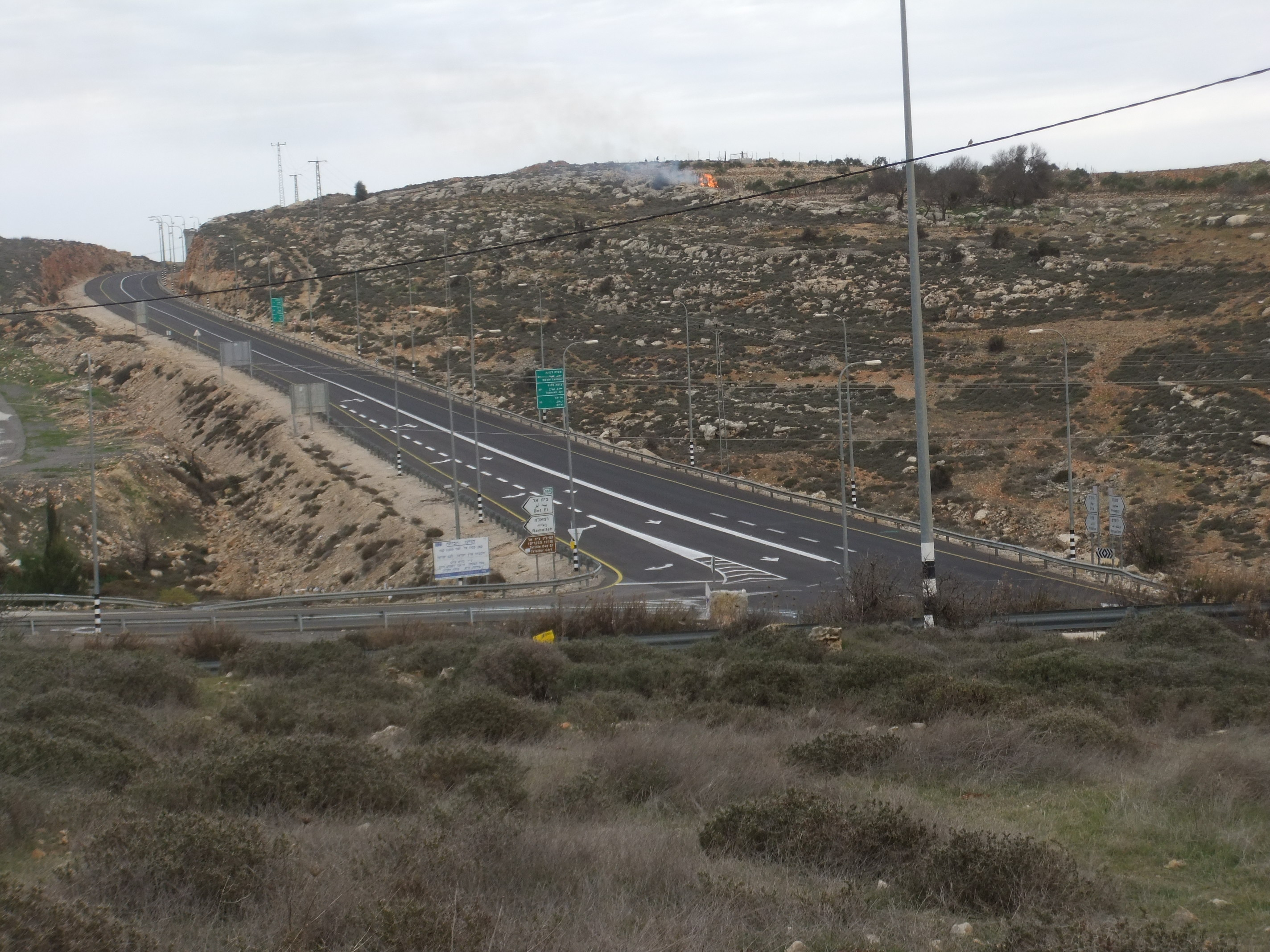
View northward at Asaf Junction (Route 466)

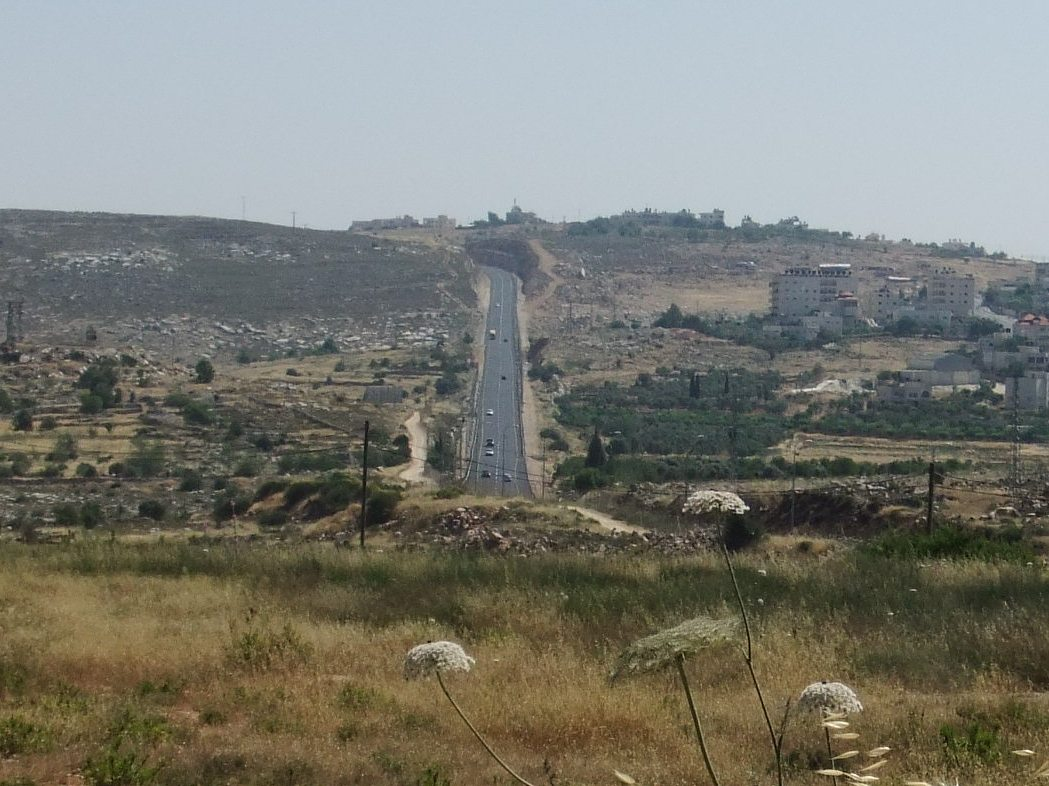
View southward at Ein Yabrud

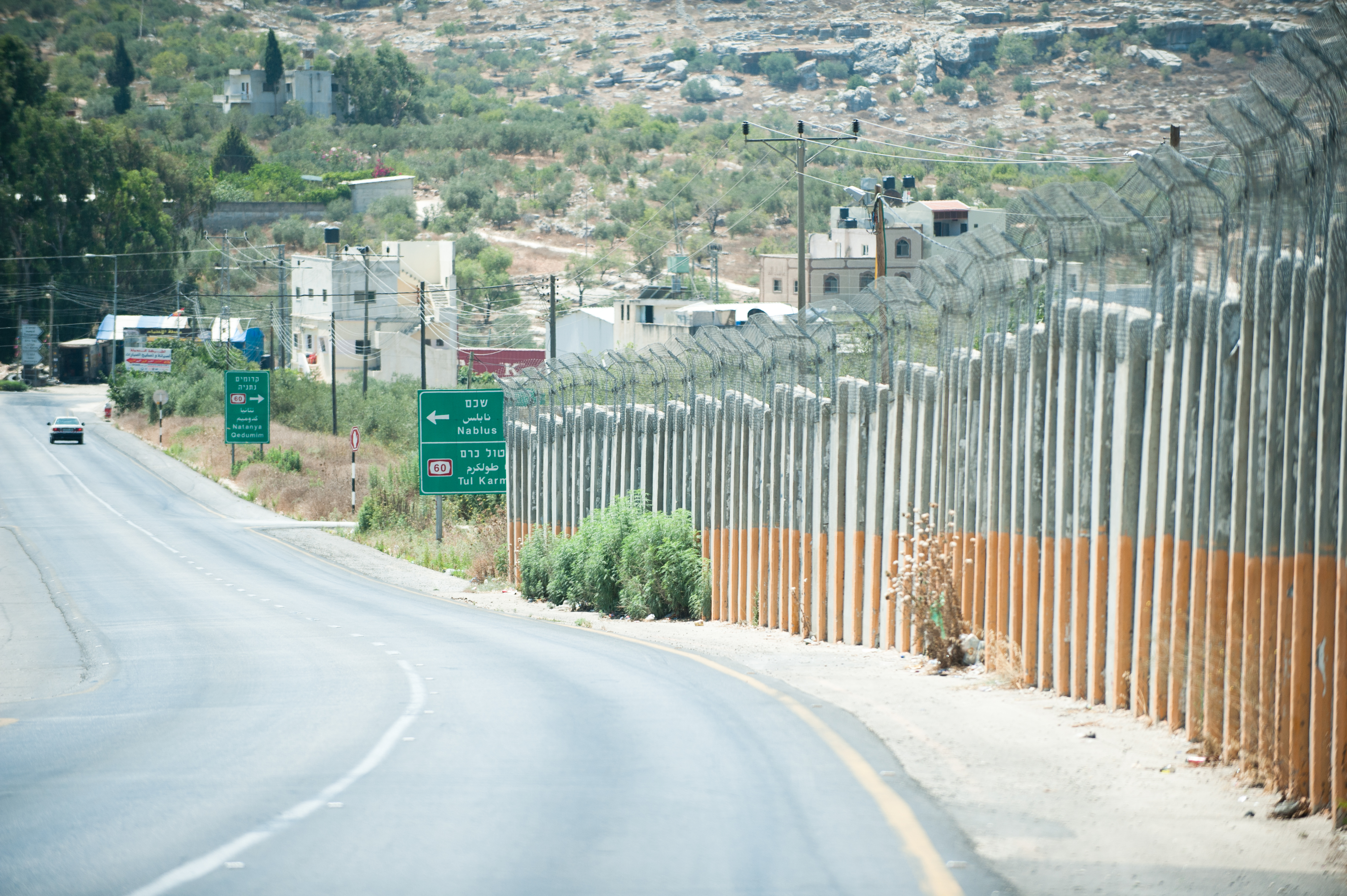
View southwards approaching Shomron Junction alongside Shavei Shomron (behind wall)

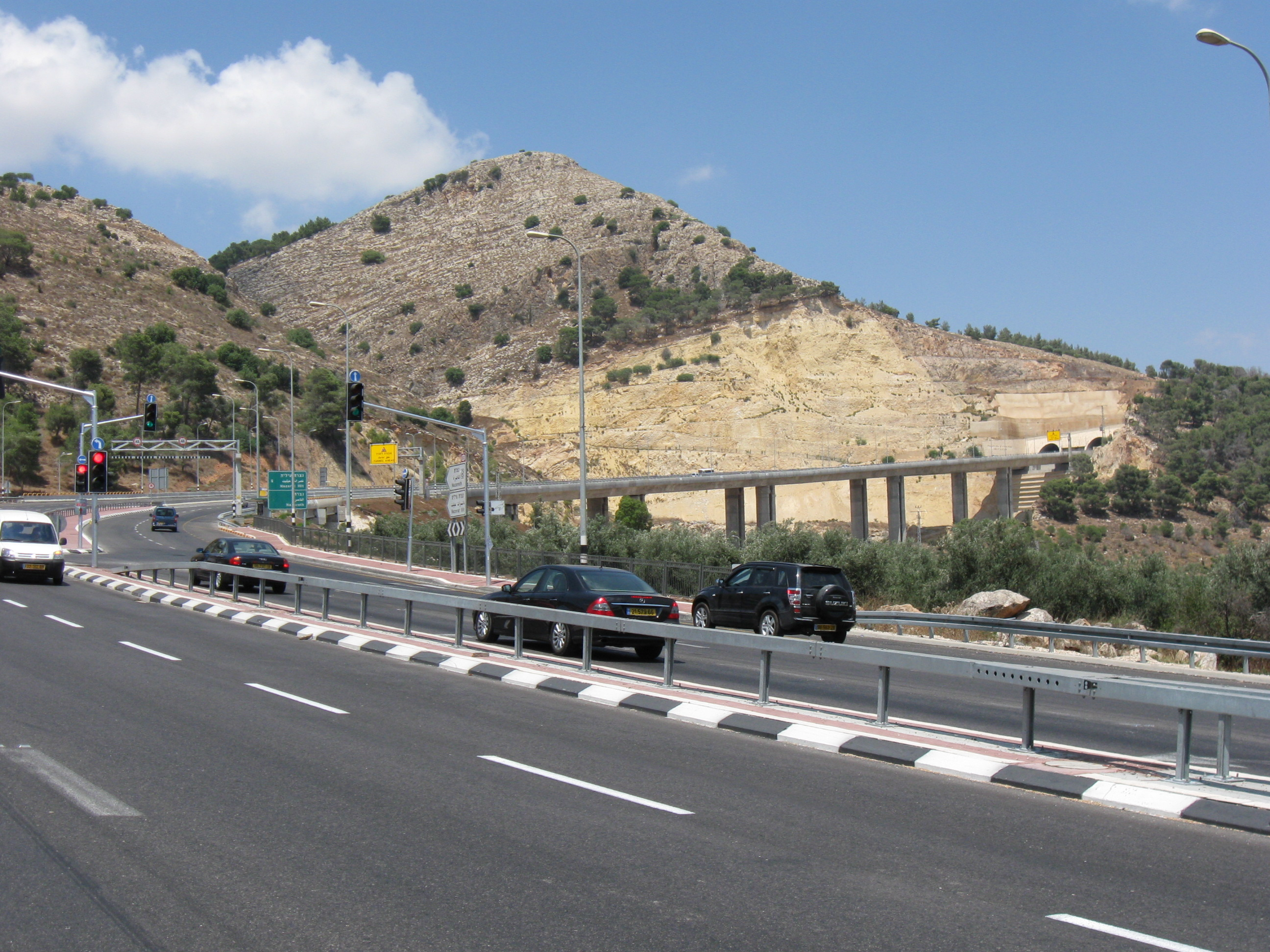
View northward at Iksal Junction approaching Rafael Eitan Bridge and Yitzhak Herskovitz Tunnels under Mount Precipice

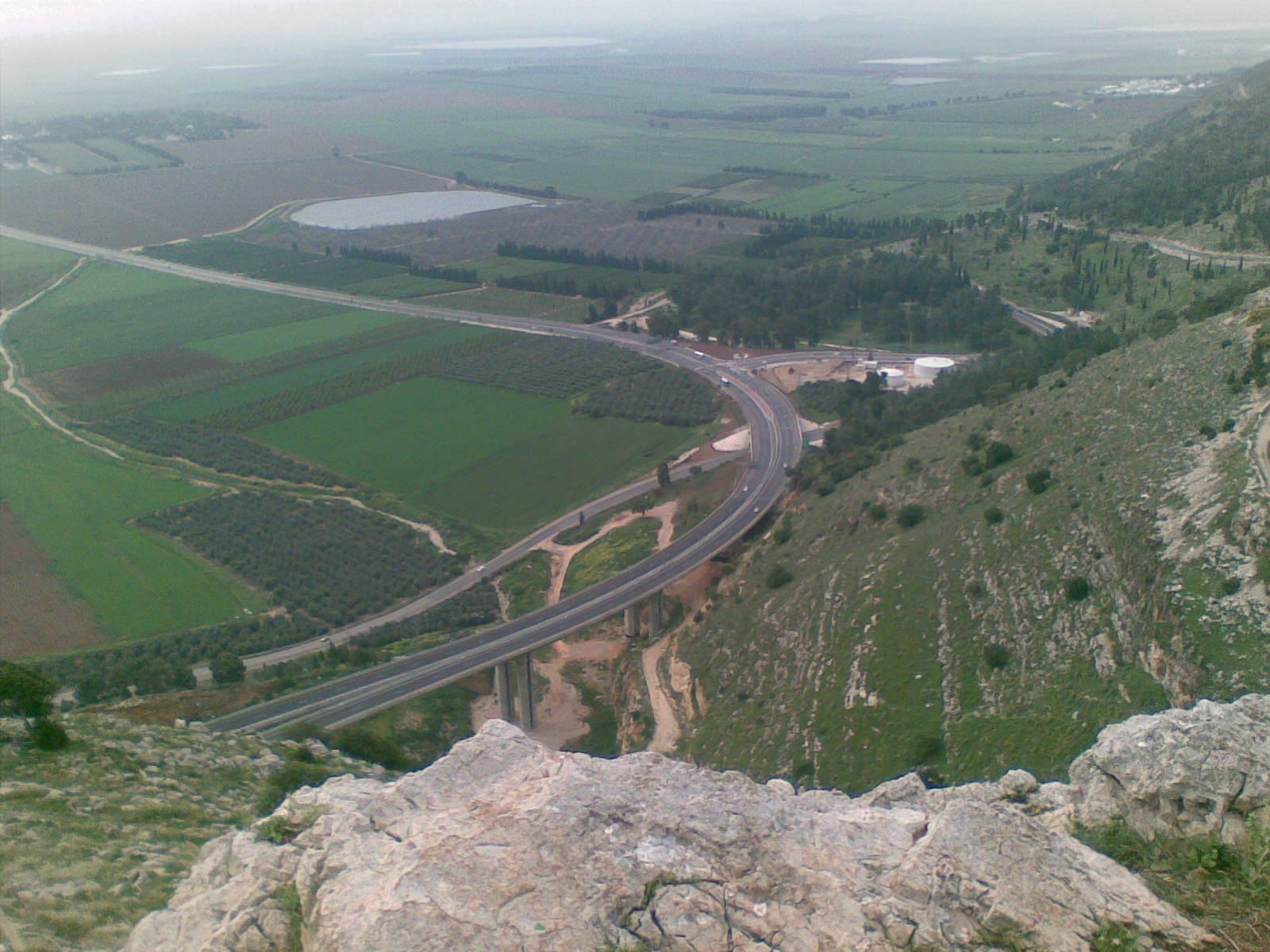
Iksal Junction & Rafael Eitan Bridge viewed from above southward

km	Location	Name	Type	Meaning	Road(s) Crossed
↓Beersheba Municipal Boundary↓
Hebron Road
0	Beersheba				Highway 25, Route 406 (David Hacham Blvd.)
0.3	Industrial Zone				Nordau St., Rothschild Blvd.
0.4	Industrial Zone				Dekel St.
0.4	Industrial Zone				HaNagarim St.
0.7	Industrial Zone				HaTahana St.
0.8	Industrial Zone				HaNagarim St.
0.9	Industrial Zone				Shazar Blvd.
1	Industrial Zone				Pinhas HaHotzev St.
1.2	Industrial Zone				Yosef HaBurska'i St.
1.5	Shopping District, Industrial Zone				Heil HaHandasa St., Yitzhak Nafaha St.
2.4	Industrial Zone				Saadia Malal Blvd.
2.4	Industrial Zone				David Ben-Gurion Blvd.
2.6	Machteshim; Industrial Zone				Avraham Ben Ami St.
3.5	Beersheba	צומת חטיבת הנגב (Hativat HaNegev Junction)		Negev Brigade	Ben Tzion Carmel Blvd., Highway 40 south
↑Beersheba Municipal Boundary↑
4.3	Omer, Tel as-Sabi	צומת תל שבע (Tel Sheva Junction)		Hill of 'Seven' or 'Oath'	Tel Sheva Rd., Highway 40 north
5.7	Omer				Tamar St.
5.9	Omer; Industrial Park				Omrim St.
7.3	Omer	מחלף עומר (Omer Interchange)			Tapuz St.
9.9	Tarabin al-Sane'/Umra, Umm Batin				local road
Under Construction
11	Kiryat HaModi'in; Umm Batin; Abu Sabit, al-Sayyid	מחלף קריית המודיעין (Kiryat Ha'Modi'in Interchange)			local road
11.2		מחלף שוקת (Shoket Interchange)			Highway 6
13		מחלף מיתר (Meitar Interchange)		Water Trough	Highway 31
14.5	Carmit	צומת כרמית (Carmit Junction)			local road
15.7	Meitar	צומת מיתר (Meitar Junction)		Cord	Hebron Blvd.
16.2	Kibbitz Kramim	צומת כרמים (Kramim Junction)		Vineyards	local road
17.6		צומת סנסנה (Sansana Junction)		(Biblical) Palm Tree	local road to Sansana
18.5	Green Line				
18.5	Green Line, Meitar Terminal				entrance to passenger terminal and cargo transfer station
18.6	Meitar Security Checkpoint				
↑NO southbound through-traffic for green (Palestinian Authority) license plates↑
18.7	Green Line, Meitar Terminal				Road 6002 to Teneh Omarim, ad-Dhahiriya, Meitar Terminal
Dhahiriya Bypass
27	Meitarim Industrial Park	צומת שמעה (Shim'a Junction)		named after minor biblical figure	Route 317
27.1	Shim'a (Yonadav)				local road
28	Mitzpe Eshtemoa				local road
31.5	as-Simya, as-Samu'				Road 3178
33.5	Otniel				local road
34.2	Khursa	צומת עתניאל (Otniel Junction)		named after biblical judge	local road
Otniel-Hagai Road
35.2	Karma				local road
36	Abda				local road
37	Deir Razih				local road
37.9	Tarrama				Road 3265
38.8	al-Hijra				Road 3266
38.85	Hadab al-Fawwar, al-Fawwar				Road 3266
41.2	Hebron (south)				Wadi al-Mufeer St
Hebron Bypass
41.5	Beit Hagai				local road
43.3	Hebron (south), Qilqis				Be'er Shahin St
44.5	Hebron (south)				entrance to District coordination Office; DCO
45.7	Hebron (south)	צומת הכבשים (HaKvasim Junction)		sheep	Route 3268 al-Malik Suleiman St entrance to Industrial Park
45.8	Hebron (south)				local road
47.6					Route 356 to Zif
49.1	Bani Naim				Route 3174
49.4	Givat Gal; Kiryat Arba; Industrial Zone				Route 3263
50.9	Kiryat Arba				local road, open during Jewish festivals for overflow traffic
52.2	Kiryat Arba				Views of Mamre St.
55	Beit Einun, Khirbat Zayta, Hebron				local road
55.9	Hebron, Halhul	צומת העוקפים (HaOkfim Junction)		the bypasses	Highway 35
Halhul bypass
59.2	Halhul, Sa'ir				Road 3517
60.2	Halhul				Route 348
Beit Ummar-AlArroub Bypass
62.8	Karmei Tzur, Halhul (north), Beit Ummar				
65.9	Beit Ummar, Al-Arroub (camp), Shuyukh al-Arrub	(southbound only)			
66.9	Al-Arrub (camp), Shuyukh al-Arrub, Beit Ummar	(northbound only)			Route 348
Gush Road
68	Beit al Baraka, filling station	(southbound only)			entrances
69.5	Alon Shvut, Migdal Oz, Beit Fajjar	צומת גוש עציון (Gush Etzion Junction)		Etzion Bloc	Route 367
70.7	Efrat (south)	צומת אפרת דרום; South Efrat Junction			Road 3157
72	Elazar				Hashmonaim St.
73.3	Neve Daniel				HaMoriya St.
75.8	Efrat (north), al-Khader, Bethlehem	צומת שיירות עציון (Shayarot Etzion Junction)		Etzion Convoys	local road
↑green license plates rejoin Highway 60 south from al-Khader↑
Bethlehem Bypass
78.4	al-Khader, Husan	צומת אל חאדר (al-Khader Junction)		The Green One	Route 375 to Beitar Illit, Tzur Hadassah
79.5	Beit Jala	(northbound only)			al-Amal St.
↓NO northbound through-traffic for green (Palestinian Authority) license plates↓ green license plates continue to Route 60 north via al-Khader or Beit Jala, local roads, Routes 398, 417 and 437
79.6	Tunnels / Patriarch's Way Security checkpoint				
Tunnels Road
80.6	Beit Jala	מנהרות רפאים (Refaim Tunnels); 5 lanes, 890 m.		'Giants' or 'Ghosts'	
82.2	Beit Jala, Gilo	גשרי גילה (Gilo Bridges); 5 lanes, 360 m.			
82.6	Gilo	מנהרות גילה (Gilo Tunnels); 5 lanes, 260 m.			
↓Jerusalem Municipal Boundary↓
83.3	Gilo	מחלף רוזמרין (Rosmarin Interchange), צומת המנהרות (HaMinharot Junction)		Rosemary, The Tunnels	HaRosmarin St., Highway 50 (Begin Boulevard).
HaRosmarin St.
83.5	Beit Safafa, Tantur				A-Safa St., entrance to Tantur
Hebron Road
83.6	Beit Safafa, Tantur	צומת טנטור (Tantur Junction)		Hilltop	Hebron Road, south to Bethlehem
83.7	Mar Elias Monastery, Har Homa				Ma'ale Darga St.
84.7	Har Homa				Route 398 (Shmuel Meir Blvd.)
84.9	Givat HaMatos, Beit Safafa				Tabaliya St.
84.9	Green Line				
85.2	Talpiot				Derech Beit Lehem
85.5	Talpiot				HaUman St., Asher Wiener St.
86.2	Talpiot				HaTnufa St.
86.4	Talpiot				Dostrovsky St.
86.7	Talpiot	כיכר יצחק לוי (Yitzhak Levi Square), צומת הבנקים (Banks Junction)			Rivka St., Ein Gedi St.
87	Baka, Talpiot				Yehuda St., Daniel Yanovsky St.
87.3	Baka				Queen Esther St.
87.6	Baka				Miriam HaHashmonait St.
87.7	Talpiot	כיכר בולגריה (Bulgaria Square)			Hanoch Albeck St.
87.8	Abu Tor				Naomi St.
88	Abu Tor				Gihon St.
88.2	Abu Tor				Aminadav St.
88.4	Abu Tor	כיכר יוסף נבון (Yosef Navon Square)			David Remez St., HaMefaked St.
89	Old City				Ma'ale HaShalom St.
Hativat Yerushalayim Street
89.4	Old City, Jaffa Gate				Omar ibn il-Khatab St. entrance to Old City
Jaffa Road
89.5	Old City, Jaffa Gate	כיכר שער יפו (Jaffa Gate Square)			Yitzhak Kariv St. Mamilla Mall
89.9		מנהרת הצנחנים (HaTsanhanim Tunnel); 2 lanes, 600m.		Paratroopers	
HaTsanhanim Street
90	Old City, New Gate				New Gate St. entrance to Old City
90.05	Saint-Louis Hospital (Notre Dame de Terre Sainte)				entrance to hospital
90.2	Old City, Musrara	כיכר אברהם הלפרין (Avraham Halperin Square) (southbound only)		named for Avraham Halperin	Ha Ayin Het St
90.4	Old City, Damascus Gate				Sultan Suleiman St.
Heil HaHandasa Street
90.5		Tunnel end			
90.6	Musrara, Mas'udiyya				HaNevi'im St., Antarah ibn Shaddad St., Light Rail Station; Light Rail Crossing
90.75	Mas'udiyya				Naomi Kis St., Ibn al-'As St.
90.8	Musrara, Mas'udiyya	(southbound only)			HaHoma HaShlishit St.
90.85	Musrara	(southbound only)			Michel Leib Katz St.
90.9	Mas'udiyya	(northbound only)			Pikud HaMerkaz St.
91	Beit Yisrael, American Colony	כיכר פיקוד הצפון (Pikud HaMerkaz Square)		Central Command	Shivtei Yisrael St., Saint George St., Light Rail Station
Haim Bar-Lev Street
91.2	Beit Yisrael	כיכר מנדלבאום (Mandelbaum Square) (southbound only)		Named for Mandelbaum Gate	Shmuel HaNavi St.
91.3	Beit Yisrael, American Colony				Moshe Zaks St., Pierre van Paassen St.
91.6					Light Rail Crossing
91.6	Green Line				
91.7	Arzei HaBira, Sheikh Jarrah				Shimon HaTzadik St., Light Rail Station
92.3	Ma'alot Dafna, Sheikh Jarrah				Zalman Shragai St., Clermont-Ganneau St.
92.6	Givat HaMivtar, French Hill	כיכר מיינרצהאגן (Meinertzhagen Square)		named after Richard Meinertzhagen	Levi Eshkol Blvd., Hebrew University Blvd. ( Route 417), Light Rail Station
93.2	Giv'at HaMivtar, French Hill				Sheshet HaYamim Blvd., Shuafat Road, HaHagana Blvd., Light Rail Station
Uzi Narkis Road / Shuafat Bypass
93.5	Shuafat, French Hill	מחלף שער מזרח (Sha'ar Mizrah Interchange)		East Gate	Highway 1
95.1	Shuafat, Pisgat Zeev	מחלף יקותיאל אדם (Yekuti'el Adam Interchange)			Yekutiel Adam Blvd.
96.1	Beit Hanina, Pisgat Zeev				Hamid Shomaan St. (Jerusalem Road 20), Amihai "Gidi" Feiglin St. (Sayeret Duchifat Blvd.) to Route 437
Musa Peled Street / Beit Hanina Bypass
97.4	Beit Hanina, Pisgat Zeev, Neve Ya'akov	כיכר מגיני עטרות ונווה יעקב (Maginei; Atarot & Neve Ya'akov; Square)		defenders of Atarot & Neve Ya'akov	Beit Hanina Rd. Neve Ya'akov Blvd.
Ramallah Road
	Shikunei Nuseiba, Dahiat al-Barid				14 local streets
98.9	Atarot				Bir Nabala Rd.
99.4	Atarot				Aviation Rd.
100.4	Qalandia; Atarot Airport				to Highway 45
↑Jerusalem Municipal Boundary↑
↓NO northbound through-traffic for yellow (Israeli) license plates↓ yellow license plates continue to Highway 60 north via Sayeret Duchifat Blvd. and Route 437
100.5	Qalandia Security checkpoint				
↑NO southbound through-traffic for green (Palestinian Authority) license plates↑ green license plates continue to Highway 60 south via Routes 437, 417, 398 and local roads, Beit Jala or al-Khader
100.6	Kafr 'Aqab				Ramallah Road
Ramallah Bypass
101.9	Ar-Ram, Jaba'				Bir Nabala Rd
↓yellow license plates rejoin Highway 60 north from Route 437↓
104.4	Geva Binyamin				Route 437, Adam Blvd.
105.1	Sha'ar Binyamin; Industrial Park				local road
106.1	Mikhmas				local road
106.2	Kokhav Ya'akov, Psagot, Migron (relocated)				local road
107.3	Ma'ale Mikhmas				Route 457 to Route 458
109.8	Migron (ordered removed by Apr 2012)				local road
112.4	al-Bireh, Beit El, Giv'at Asaf, Burqa, Beitin	צומת אסף (Asaf Junction)		named after Asaf Hershkovitz	Route 466
113.4	Deir Dibwan				local road
118.1	Ofra	צומת עפרה (Ofra Junction)		named after biblical town	HaMiyasdim St.
118.3	Ein Yabrud, Yabrud, Silwad				Route 449
123.1		צומת המשטרה הבריטית (HaMishtara HaBritit Junction)		British Police	Route 465 to Birzeit, Ateret
124.2	Al-Mazra'a ash-Sharqiya				Road 4568
127.4	Sinjil				Road 4665
129	Sinjil				local road
129.4	Turmus Ayya				local road
131.3	Shilo	צומת שילה (Shilo Junction)		named after biblical town	local road
Wadi ash-Sha'ir Road
135.1	Eli				Elkana Rd.
135.3	Eli				14th of Elul St.
136.9	Ma'ale Levona				local road
137.9	Al-Lubban ash-Sharqiya				local road
140.3	Qabalan				Road 4777
140.1	As-Sawiya				local road
142.7	Rechelim, Ariel				local road
145.1	Kfar Tapuach	צומת תפוח (Tapuah Junction)		Apple	Route 505
Huwara Road
145.8	Za'tara (Beita)				local road
147.8	Beita				local road
147.9	Huwara				local streets
148.4	Huwara				Road 5076 to Einabus
148.6	Huwara				local road to Odala, local streets
149.3	Huwara				local streets, Road 555 to Nablus, Itamar, Elon Moreh
Nablus Bypass
151.2	Yitzhar, Burin				local road
160.9	Sarra				local road to Nablus
161.1	Jit	צומת ג'ית (Jit Junction)			Highway 55 (west)
163.9	Kedumim Local Council, Bar-On Industrial Park				local road
167.2					Route 557 (west)
167.9	Shavei Shomron				local road
↓Travel for yellow (Israeli) license plates between Shomron Junction and Dotan Junction permitted, IDF escort recommended↓
169.9	Deir Sharaf	צומת שומרון (Shomron Junction)		Samaria	local road
169.8	An-Naqura				local road
171	Sebastia				Road 5715
171.7	Sebastia				local road
177.1	Burqa				local road
178.4	Bazariya				local road
179.1	Homesh (evacuated)				local road
180.3	Silat ad-Dhahr				local streets
182.5	Fandaqumiya				local streets
183.9	Jaba				local road
184	Jaba				Road 5725 to Sanur, Meithalun
184.8	Sa-Nur (evacuated)				local road
186	Ajjah				local road
187.5	Anzah				local road
189.6	Zawiya				local road
191.5					local road
194.2	Mirka	צומת דותן (Dotan Junction)		named after ancient city	Route 585, Route 588
↑Travel for yellow (Israeli) license plates between Dotan Junction and Shomron Junction permitted, IDF escort recommended↑
↓NO northbound through-traffic for yellow (Israeli) license plates↓
Route 588
194.5	Tel Dothan				local road
195.2	Bir al-Basha				6 local streets
↓Palestinian Authority Area A↓
199.7	Ash-Shuhada, Qabatiya	צומת קבאטיה (Qabatiya Junction)			local road
203.2	Jenin				22 local streets
207.2	Dahiyat Sabah al-Kheir				11 local streets
↑Palestinian Authority Area A↑
Jalamah Road
209.8	Jalamah				Road 6010 South to Zababdeh, Wadi ad-Dabi', Kadim (evacuated), Ganim (evacuated)
210.2	Jalamah				6 local streets
211.2	Green Line, Jalamah Terminal				entrance to passenger terminal and cargo transfer station
211.4	Green Line				
↓NO northbound through-traffic for green (Palestinian Authority) license plates↓
211.5	Jalamah Security checkpoint				
↑NO southbound through-traffic for yellow (Israeli) license plates↑
211.8	Green Line, Jalamah Terminal, Muqeible				entrance to passenger terminal and cargo transfer station, local road to Muqeible
212.7	Magen Shaul				local road
212.9	Sandala				2 local roads
214.3	Gan Ner				local road
216	Prazon				local road
217.2	Yizre'el, Avital	צומת יזרעאל (Yizre'el Junction)		God Sows	Route 675
↓Afula Municipal Boundary↓
Jerusalem Boulevard
223.1	Afula	צומת אפולה דרום מזרח (Afula Drom Mizrah Junction)		South-East Afula	Menachem Begin Blvd.
223.3	Afula				Gilboa St.
223.6	Afula				Yehoshua Hankin St.
223.8	Afula				Ussishkin St.
223.9	Afula				Kehilat Tzion Blvd.
Yosef Sprinzak Boulevard
224	Afula				HaNasi Weizmann Blvd., Afula Central Bus Station
HaNasi Weizmann Boulevard
224.1	Afula				Jerusalem Blvd.
224.3	Afula	כיכר העצמאות (HaAtzma'ut Square)		Independence	Arlozorov St.
224.5	Afula	כיכר פז (Paz Square)			Moshe Sharett St., Holland St., Zalman Hod St.
Hativat Teisha' Boulevard
224.6	Afula				Zalman Shazar St.
224.7	Afula				Rimon St.
224.8	Afula				Hadasim St., Einstein Blvd.
224.9	Afula				Etrog St.
225	Afula				Tzaftzefot St., HaAvoda St.
225.15	Afula	צומת מכבי אש (Mikhabei Esh Junction)		Firefighters	HaHistadrut St. HaHadarim St.
225.45	Afula				Yukler B'Emek; Shopping Center
226	Afula				Highway 65 East
226.2	Afula				Highway 65 West
↑Afula Municipal Boundary↑
226.9	Balfouria				local road
228.7	Kfar Gid'on				local road
229.2	Jezreel Valley; Regional Council, Mizra, Emek Yezreel College				local road
230	Tel Adashim				local road
230.2	Tel Adashim	צומת עדשים (Adashim Junction)		Lentils	Highway 73 West
↓Nazareth Municipal Boundary↓
232.2	Nazareth, Iksal	צומת איכסאל (Iksal Junction)		Chores	Marj Ibn Amer Rd.
232.6	Har HaKfitza (Mount Precipice)	גשר רפאל איתן (Raphael Eitan Bridge); 4 lanes, 400m.			
233	Har HaKfitza (Mount Precipice)	מנהרות יצחק הרשקוביץ (Yitzhak Herskovitz Tunnels); 4 lanes, 380m.			
234.6	Nazareth; Industrial Zone A	(southbound only)			Wadi el-Hadj St.
235.1	Nazareth	צומת המוסכים (HaMusachim Junction)		Auto Repair Shops	Highway 75 (HaTsiyonut Blvd.), Tawfiq Ziad St.

== See also ==
- List of highways in Israel
- Nablus Road, old road, now city street, once connecting Jerusalem's Old City (Damascus Gate) to Nablus
- Way of the Patriarchs, the main north–south historical route in the area
