= Talfit, Jenin =

Local Development Committee in Jenin, State of Palestine

Telfit
- Local Development Committee

Arabic transcription(s)
  - Arabic: تلفت
  - Latin: Telfit, Tilfit, Talfit
- Location of Telfit within Palestine
- Coordinates: 32°24′4″N 35°20′25″E
- Palestine grid: 182/200
- State: State of Palestine
- Governorate: Jenin

Government
  - Type: Local Development Committee

Population (2017)
  - Total: 439
- Name meaning: "The Ruin of Telfit"

Talfit (Arabic: تلفيت), also pronounced Tilfit (PRHP), is a Palestinian village in the Jenin Governorate of Palestine, in the northern West Bank, located southeast of Jenin. According to the Palestinian Central Bureau of Statistics (PCBS) census, the village had a population of 238 in 2007 and 439 by 2017.

Situated on an isolated tell in the Zababdeh Valley, Talfit has an elevation of 390 meters above sea level. Nearby localities include Kufeir to the south, Zababdeh to the southwest, Qabatiya to the west, Umm at-Tut to the north, Jalqamus and al-Mughayyir to the northeast and Raba to the southeast. The principal water source is Ein Ginai, 6 kilometers to the west and there are 35 cisterns in the village. In 1980 Talfit's built-up area consisted of 15 dunams.

== History ==
The northern and westerns parts of Talfit contain ruins dating to the Byzantine and Early Islamic periods between the 5th-8th centuries. Ancient building material is used in some of the houses.

The Reḥov mosaic inscription from the Byzantine period lists Shaffirin (שפירין), identified with Khirbet Saffirin in Tilfit, among the Jewish settlements of the Sebaste district, whose inhabitants were exempt from agricultural laws governing produce because of the territory’s ambiguous status.

=== Ottoman era ===
Talfit is absent from 16th century records. It was initially settled by people from Qabatiya. It is likely that the village was not inhabited before the 18th century.

In 1838, during the Ottoman era, ‘’Talfit’’ was noted as a Muslim village in the Haritheh area, north of Nablus.

The PEF's Survey of Western Palestine noted in 1882 that the place (then called "Khurbet Talfit") had modern masonry.

=== British Mandate era ===
In the 1922 census of Palestine, conducted by the British Mandate authorities, Talfit had a population of 43; 24 Muslims and 19 Christians, where the Christians were all Orthodox. The population increased in the 1931 census to 120; all Muslim, in a total of 26 houses.

In the 1945 statistics the population was 170; all Muslims, with 6,627 dunams of land, according to an official land and population survey. 194 dunams were used for plantations and irrigable land, 2,726 dunams for cereals, while a total of 3,707 dunams were non-cultivable land.

=== 1948-1967 ===
In the wake of the 1948 Arab–Israeli War and after the 1949 Armistice Agreements, Talfit came under Jordanian rule.

=== post-1967 ===
Since the Six-Day War in 1967, Talfit has been under Israeli occupation.

== Demography ==
=== Diaspora ===
Most of the village's residents are descendants of refugees from Arabia and Turkmen from Central Asia, who work as land tenants.

== Bibliography ==
- Barron, J.B., ed. (1923). Palestine: Report and General Abstracts of the Census of 1922. Government of Palestine.
- Conder, C.R.; Kitchener, H.H. (1882). The Survey of Western Palestine: Memoirs of the Topography, Orography, Hydrography, and Archaeology. Vol. 2. London: Committee of the Palestine Exploration Fund.
- Dauphin, C. (1998). La Palestine byzantine, Peuplement et Populations. BAR International Series 726 (in French). Vol. III : Catalogue. Oxford: Archeopress. ISBN 0-860549-05-4.
- Department of Statistics (1945). Village Statistics, April, 1945. Government of Palestine.
- Hadawi, S. (1970). Village Statistics of 1945: A Classification of Land and Area ownership in Palestine. Palestine Liberation Organization Research Center.
- Mills, E., ed. (1932). Census of Palestine 1931. Population of Villages, Towns and Administrative Areas. Jerusalem: Government of Palestine.
- Palmer, E.H. (1881). The Survey of Western Palestine: Arabic and English Name Lists Collected During the Survey by Lieutenants Conder and Kitchener, R. E. Transliterated and Explained by E.H. Palmer. Committee of the Palestine Exploration Fund.
- Robinson, E.; Smith, E. (1841). Biblical Researches in Palestine, Mount Sinai and Arabia Petraea: A Journal of Travels in the year 1838. Vol. 3. Boston: Crocker & Brewster.
- Zertal, A. (2007). The Manasseh Hill Country Survey. Vol. 2. Boston: BRILL. ISBN 9004163697.
