= Rummanah =

- Municipality type D (Village council)

Arabic transcription(s)
  - Arabic: رمّانه
  - Latin: Rummaneh (official); Rumana (unofficial)
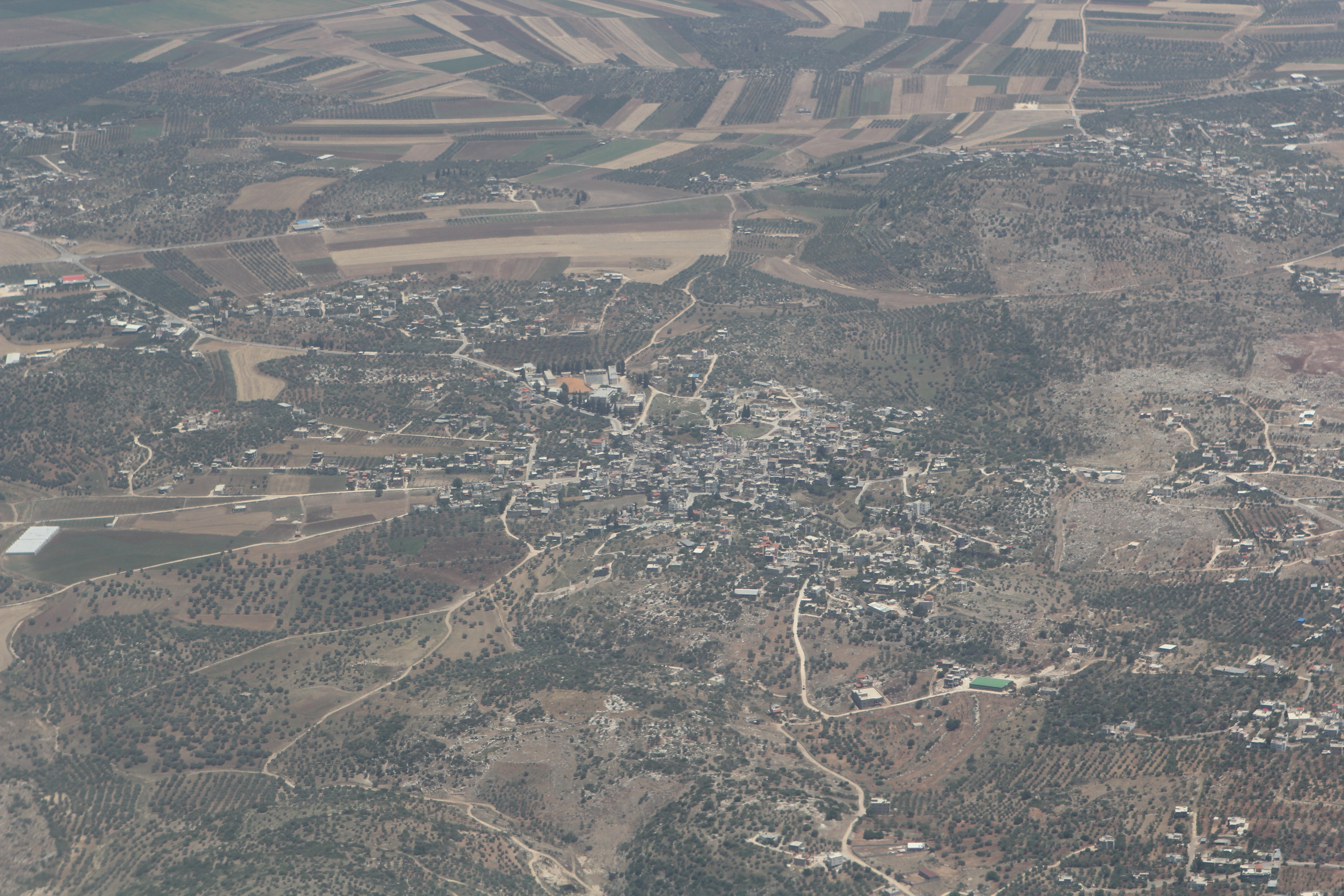
- Rummanah

- Location of Rummanah within Palestine
- Coordinates: 32°31′26″N 35°12′18″E
- Palestine grid: 169/214
- State: State of Palestine
- Governorate: Jenin

Government
  - Type: Village council

Population (2017)
  - Total: 3,637
- Name meaning: "Pomegranates" (Rimmon)

Rummanah (Arabic: رمّانه) is a Palestinian village in the Jenin Governorate of Palestine, located 17 kilometers (11 mi) northwest of the city of Jenin in the northern West Bank. According to the Palestinian Central Bureau of Statistics (PCBS), the town had a population of 3,372 inhabitants in mid-year 2006.

== History ==
The SWP found cisterns cut in the rock and a well. Dauphin described the place as being an ancient village on a hill slope, with traces of ancient remains, including cisterns and caves carved into rock.

=== Ottoman period ===
Rumana, like the rest of Palestine, was incorporated into the Ottoman Empire in 1517. During the 16th and 17th centuries, it belonged to the Turabay emirate (which became the Liwa of Lajjun) (1517–1683). In the census of 1549–1549 or 1596, the village was located in the nahiya of Shara in the Liwa of Lajjun. It had a population of 12 households, all Muslim. The villagers paid a fixed tax-rate of 25% on agricultural products, including wheat, barley, summer crops, olive trees, goats and beehives, in addition to occasional revenues; a total of 9,000 akçe.

The Dutch lieutenant van der Velde travelled in the area in 1851–2. He noted that Scottish missionaries in 1839 had found many old wells and other old remains in the area. He also described the village (called Rumuni) as being small, and identified it with ancient Hadad-rimmon (see Zechariah 12:11). French explorer Victor Guérin visited the village in 1863 and 1870, and described it as being reduced to "twenty miserable dwellings". He did not notice any traces of antiquity, except for a few cisterns in the rock and a working well. Guérin agreed that the village was Hadad-Rimon, but disagreed with Jeromes assertion that Hadad-Rimon was identical with Maximianopolis.

In 1870/1871 (1288 AH), an Ottoman census listed the village in the nahiya of Shafa al-Gharby. In the 1882 the PEF's Survey of Western Palestine (SWP), the village (called Rummaneh) was described as:

A small village of mud and stone, near the foot of the hills, with wells to the west and olives below. This village seems to mark the site of Maximianopolis, a town 20 Roman miles from Caesarea and 10 miles from Jezreel (Zer'in), the ancient name of Maximianopolis being, according to Jerome, "Hadad Rimmon".

=== British Mandate era ===
In the 1922 census of Palestine conducted by the British Mandate authorities, Rumaneh had a population of 548, all Muslim, increasing in the 1931 census to 644, still all Muslim, in 151 houses.

In the 1945 statistics, the population of Rummana (including Khirbat Salim) was 880 Muslims while the total land area was 21,676 dunams, according to an official land and population survey. Of this, 2,876 dunams were allocated for plantations and irrigable land, 10,507 for cereals, while 27 dunams were classified as built-up areas.

=== Jordanian era ===
In the wake of the 1948 Arab–Israeli War and the 1949 Armistice Agreements, Rummanah came under Jordanian rule.

The Jordanian census of 1961 found 1,214 inhabitants.

=== post-1967 ===
Since the Six-Day War in 1967, Rummanah has been under Israeli occupation. On 31 December 2016, Israeli soldiers stormed the village and began firing stun grenades at residents, leading to clashes between them and local men.

== Demography ==
=== Local origins ===
Some inhabitants of Rummanah originated from Ya'bad, Kafr Ra'i, and Deir al-Ghusun, while others migrated from Egypt, and some residents are Bedouins from the Mount Tabor area.

== Bibliography ==
- Barron, J.B., ed. (1923). Palestine: Report and General Abstracts of the Census of 1922. Government of Palestine.
- Conder, C.R.; Kitchener, H.H. (1882). The Survey of Western Palestine: Memoirs of the Topography, Orography, Hydrography, and Archaeology. Vol. 2. London: Committee of the Palestine Exploration Fund.
- Dauphin, C. (1998). La Palestine byzantine, Peuplement et Populations. BAR International Series 726 (in French). Vol. III : Catalogue. Oxford: Archeopress. ISBN 0-860549-05-4.
- Government of Jordan, Department of Statistics (1964). First Census of Population and Housing. Volume I: Final Tables; General Characteristics of the Population (PDF).
- Government of Palestine, Department of Statistics (1945). Village Statistics, April, 1945.
- Guérin, V. (1875). Description Géographique Historique et Archéologique de la Palestine (in French). Vol. 2: Samarie, pt. 2. Paris: L'Imprimerie Nationale.
- Hadawi, S. (1970). Village Statistics of 1945: A Classification of Land and Area ownership in Palestine. Palestine Liberation Organization Research Center.
- Heyd, Uriel (1960). Ottoman Documents on Palestine, 1552–1615. Oxford: Oxford University Press.
- Hütteroth, W.-D.; Abdulfattah, K. (1977). Historical Geography of Palestine, Transjordan and Southern Syria in the Late 16th Century. Erlanger Geographische Arbeiten, Sonderband 5. Erlangen, Germany: Vorstand der Fränkischen Geographischen Gesellschaft. ISBN 3-920405-41-2.
- Mills, E., ed. (1932). Census of Palestine 1931. Population of Villages, Towns and Administrative Areas. Jerusalem: Government of Palestine.
- Palmer, E.H. (1881). The Survey of Western Palestine: Arabic and English Name Lists Collected During the Survey by Lieutenants Conder and Kitchener, R. E. Transliterated and Explained by E.H. Palmer. Committee of the Palestine Exploration Fund.
- Velde, van de, C.W.M. (1854). Narrative of a journey through Syria and Palestine in 1851 and 1852. Vol. 1. William Blackwood and son.
- Zertal, A. (2016). The Manasseh Hill Country Survey: From Nahal 'Iron to Nahal Shechem. Vol. 3. Brill. ISBN 978-9004312302. (p. 106)
