= Nour Odeh =

Palestinian political analyst

- Education: Golden Gate University
- Occupations: political analyst, activist, researcher, public diplomacy consultant, journalist and author
- Years active: 20+
- Known for: Former first Palestinian woman spokesperson to Palestinian Authority, Al Jazeera correspondent

Nour Odeh is a Palestinian political analyst, activist, researcher, public diplomacy consultant, journalist, author and former spokesperson to Palestinian Authority. She was notably Palestine's first ever female government spokesperson. She is the founding member and committee member of the Democratic National Assembly of Palestine. She is a 1999 graduate of Golden Gate University in San Francisco.

== Career ==
Odeh has been an independent media professional communications consultant and freelance journalist for over 20 years. She also worked as the Al Jazeera English network's senior correspondent for the West Bank and Gaza for five years from 2006 to 2011. In 2008, her reporting won Al Jazeera English's first Golden Nymph award in the Monte Carlo Festival. Additionally, she has served as a senior communications consultant and public relations advisor to the Palestinian government. In 2012, she was appointed Palestinian Authority spokesperson and thus became the first Palestinian women in that role. She was a candidate of Palestinian Legislative Council for the 2012–13 Palestinian local elections. She has also appeared as a regular guest in various international news outlets such as Al Jazeera.

In late 2025 she rejoined Al Jazeera as their regular reporter for Israel and the occupied Palestinian Territories. Al Jazeera had been expelled by Israel in May 2024, including confiscation of equipment from their Ramallah, West Bank office in September of that year. Her reporting supplemented that of expelled journalists operating in Amman, Jordan. She reported from Ramallah, West Bank..
