= Jalqamus =

- Municipality type D (Village council)

Arabic transcription(s)
  - Arabic: جلقموس
- Location of Jalqamus within Palestine
- Coordinates: 32°25′27″N 35°21′50″E
- Palestine grid: 184/173
- State: State of Palestine
- Governorate: Jenin

Government
  - Type: Village council

Population (2017)
  - Total: 2,624
- Name meaning: The mound of thistles

Jalqamus (Arabic: جلقموس) is a Palestinian village in the West Bank, located 10 km southeast of the city of Jenin in the northern West Bank. According to the Palestinian Central Bureau of Statistics, the town had a population of 1,867 inhabitants in mid-year 2006 and 2,624 by 2017.

== History ==
Jalaqmus is not found in 16th century records, but local describe it as an ancient site. Its original residents reportedly came from the areas of Nablus and Ramallah.

Ceramics from the Byzantine era have been found here.

=== Ottoman era ===
In 1517 Jalqamus was incorporated into the Ottoman Empire with the rest of Palestine. During the 16th and 17th centuries, it belonged to the Turabay Emirate (1517-1683), which encompassed the Jezreel Valley, Mount Carmel, Beit She'an Valley, northern Samaria, Ramot Menashe, the northern part of the Sharon plain.

In 1838, during the Ottoman era, Jelkamus was noted as a village in the Haritheh area, north of Nablus.

In 1870, Jalqamus, called Djell Kamous, situated south of Deir Abu Da'if, was one of the villages Victor Guérin noted from Faqqua.

In 1870/1871 (1288 AH), an Ottoman census listed the village in the nahiya (sub-district) of Shafa al-Qibly.

In 1882, the PEF's Survey of Western Palestine described Jelkamus as "a small village on a hill-top, surrounded by plough-land, with a few olives, built of stone and mud, with rain-water cisterns."

=== British Mandate era ===
In the 1922 census of Palestine, conducted by the British Mandate authorities, Jalqamus had a population of 124 Muslims, increasing in the 1931 census to 150 Muslims, in a total of 31 houses.

In the 1944/5 statistics the population of Jalqamus was 220 Muslims, with 4,437 dunams of land, according to an official land and population survey. Of this, 180 dunams were used for plantations and irrigable land, 2,422 for cereals, while 6 dunams were built-up (urban) land.

=== Jordanian era ===
In the wake of the 1948 Arab–Israeli War, and after the 1949 Armistice Agreements, Jalqamus came under Jordanian rule.

The Jordanian census of 1961 found 435 inhabitants.

=== Post-1967 ===
Since the Six-Day War in 1967, Jalqamus has been under Israeli occupation. Under the Oslo Accords, the town was assigned to Area A.

During the early months of the First Intifada, 17 May 1989, Omar Yusuf Bayer, aged 42, from Jalqamus, was shot dead while in Jenin. Yitzhak Rabin in a reply to a member of Knesset, August 1989, confirmed early reports that he had been shot by a civilian and therefor the Military Police Investigators were not investigating.

== Holy sites ==
Jalaqmus is home to a shrine dedicated to the village's saint, named Ash-Sheikh Muhammad al-Muamni (Arabic: السيخ محمد المومني). It is located in the southern part of the village, near the village's mosque.

== Demography ==
According to local tradition, the people of Jalaqmus belong to the al-Muaminin tribe, descendants of Husayn ibn Ali. Historically, this tribe was one of the largest and strongest in northern Transjordan. Its members migrated to Palestine, Lebanon, and Saudi Arabia.

== Bibliography ==
- Barron, J.B., ed. (1923). Palestine: Report and General Abstracts of the Census of 1922. Government of Palestine.
- Conder, C.R.; Kitchener, H.H. (1882). The Survey of Western Palestine: Memoirs of the Topography, Orography, Hydrography, and Archaeology. Vol. 2. London: Committee of the Palestine Exploration Fund.
- Dauphin, C. (1998). La Palestine byzantine, Peuplement et Populations. BAR International Series 726 (in French). Vol. III : Catalogue. Oxford: Archeopress. ISBN 0-860549-05-4.
- Government of Jordan, Department of Statistics (1964). First Census of Population and Housing. Volume I: Final Tables; General Characteristics of the Population (PDF).
- Government of Palestine, Department of Statistics (1945). Village Statistics, April, 1945.
- Guérin, V. (1874). Description Géographique Historique et Archéologique de la Palestine (in French). Vol. 2: Samarie, pt. 1. Paris: L'Imprimerie Nationale.
- Hadawi, S. (1970). Village Statistics of 1945: A Classification of Land and Area ownership in Palestine. Palestine Liberation Organization Research Center.
- Mills, E., ed. (1932). Census of Palestine 1931. Population of Villages, Towns and Administrative Areas. Jerusalem: Government of Palestine.
- Palmer, E.H. (1881). The Survey of Western Palestine: Arabic and English Name Lists Collected During the Survey by Lieutenants Conder and Kitchener, R. E. Transliterated and Explained by E.H. Palmer. Committee of the Palestine Exploration Fund.
- Robinson, E.; Smith, E. (1841). Biblical Researches in Palestine, Mount Sinai and Arabia Petraea: A Journal of Travels in the year 1838. Vol. 3. Boston: Crocker & Brewster.
