= Umm al-Tut =

- Municipality type D (Village council)

Arabic transcription(s)
  - Arabic: ام التوت
- Location of Umm al-Tut within Palestine
- Coordinates: 32°25′56″N 35°20′40″E
- Palestine grid: 182/204
- State: State of Palestine
- Governorate: Jenin

Government
  - Type: Village council

Population (2017)
  - Total: 1,194
- Name meaning: "The place with the mulberries" "The mother of all strawberries"

Umm al-Tut (Arabic: ام التوت, romanized: ām al-tūt, literally "Mulberries Place") is a Palestinian village 6 km southeast of the city of Jenin in the northern West Bank. According to the Palestinian Central Bureau of Statistics, the town had a population of 1003 inhabitants in mid-year 2006 and 1,194 by 2017.

== History ==
In 1517 Umm al-Tut was incorporated into the Ottoman Empire with the rest of Palestine. During the 16th and 17th centuries, it belonged to the Turabay Emirate (1517-1683), which encompassed also the Jezreel Valley, Haifa, Jenin, Beit She'an Valley, northern Jabal Nablus, Bilad al-Ruha/Ramot Menashe, and the northern part of the Sharon plain. Its original residents reportedly came from the areas of Nablus and Ramallah.

In 1870, Umm al-Tut, called Oumm et-Toutah, situated south of Deir Abu Da'if, was one of the villages Victor Guérin noted from Faqqua.

In 1882, the PEF's Survey of Western Palestine described the village as resembling El Mughair, and that it stood "amongst dense thickets on the north and west, and has open plough-land on the south."

=== British Mandate era ===
In the 1922 census of Palestine conducted by the British Mandate authorities, Umm al-Tut had a population 94 Muslims, increasing in the 1931 census to 129 Muslims, in a total of 24 houses.

In 1945 statistics the population was 170 Muslims, with 4,876 dunams of land, according to an official land and population survey. Of this, 132 dunams were used for plantations and irrigable land, 1,705 dunams were for cereals, while a total of 6 dunams were built-up, urban land.

=== Jordanian era ===
Following the 1948 Arab–Israeli War, and the subsequent 1949 Armistice Agreements, Umm al-Tut came under Jordanian rule.

The Jordanian census of 1961 found 266 inhabitants in Um Tut.

=== Post-1967 ===
Since the 1967 Six-Day War Umm al-Tut has been under Israeli occupation.

The village is a major center of natural resources, nearby villages use 10% of Umm al-Tut's abundant surplus of fuel wood and also rely on Umm al-Tut's many pastures to raise their livestock. Because of this, Umm al-Tut is under notably ample pressure due to increases in illegal/unauthorized grazing, logging, hunting, and waste disposal, as well as unlawful seizures of property by neighboring villages to convert into agricultural stock.

== Bibliography ==
- Barron, J.B., ed. (1923). Palestine: Report and General Abstracts of the Census of 1922. Government of Palestine.
- Conder, C.R.; Kitchener, H.H. (1882). The Survey of Western Palestine: Memoirs of the Topography, Orography, Hydrography, and Archaeology. Vol. 2. London: Committee of the Palestine Exploration Fund.
- Government of Jordan, Department of Statistics (1964). First Census of Population and Housing. Volume I: Final Tables; General Characteristics of the Population (PDF).
- Government of Palestine, Department of Statistics (1945). Village Statistics, April, 1945.
- Guérin, V. (1874). Description Géographique Historique et Archéologique de la Palestine (in French). Vol. 2: Samarie, pt. 1. Paris: L'Imprimerie Nationale.
- Hadawi, S. (1970). Village Statistics of 1945: A Classification of Land and Area ownership in Palestine. Palestine Liberation Organization Research Center.
- Mills, E., ed. (1932). Census of Palestine 1931. Population of Villages, Towns and Administrative Areas. Jerusalem: Government of Palestine.
- Palmer, E.H. (1881). The Survey of Western Palestine: Arabic and English Name Lists Collected During the Survey by Lieutenants Conder and Kitchener, R. E. Transliterated and Explained by E.H. Palmer. Committee of the Palestine Exploration Fund.
