= Al-Tayba, Jenin =

al-Tayba
- Municipality type C

Arabic transcription(s)
  - Arabic: خربة الطيبه
- Location of al-Tayba within Palestine
- Coordinates: 32°30′55″N 35°11′21″E
- Palestine grid: 167/213
- State: State of Palestine
- Governorate: Jenin

Government
  - Type: Municipality

Population (2017)
  - Total: 2,215
- Name meaning: The goodly

Al-Tayba (Arabic: خربة الطيبه) is a Palestinian village in the West Bank, located 18 km northwest of the city of Jenin in the northern West Bank, and 2 km east of Umm el-Fahm in Israel. According to the Palestinian Central Bureau of Statistics, the town had a population of 2,386 inhabitants in mid-year 2006 and 2,215 in 2017.

== History ==
The current village was covering as of 2016 the slopes surrounding an ancient khirba (ruined village), Khirbet et-Taiybeh. The ancient village only covered the southern slope of a hill and the ravine to its south. Excavations indicate that it was mainly active in the Late Roman, Byzantine, and Medieval periods, with lesser findings from the Persian, Early Muslim and Ottoman periods.

=== Ottoman period ===
All of Palestine was incorporated into the Ottoman Empire in 1517.

Zertal writes that after no mention of the village in Medieval sources, Tayyiba is listed with six Muslim households appears in the Ottoman census of 1596. Hütteroth and Abdulfattah also mention the 1596 tax register as being part of the nahiya (subdistrict) of Sha'ara under the liwa' (district) of Lajjun. The villagers paid a fixed tax rate of 25% on agricultural products, including wheat, barley, summer crops, olive trees, beehives and/or goats, in addition to occasional revenues; a total of 3,500 akçe.

The modern al-Tayiba began as a dependency of the so-called "Fahmawi Commonwealth" established by Hebronite clans belonging to Umm al-Fahm. The Commonwealth consisted of a network of interspersed communities connected by ties of kinship, and socially, economically and politically affiliated with Umm al Fahm. It dominated vast sections of Bilad al-Ruha/Ramot Menashe, Wadi 'Ara and Marj Ibn 'Amir/Jezreel Valley during that time. This affiliation is recorded in the 1870/1871 (1288 AH) Ottoman census, which listed the village, as Tayibat Umm al-Fahm in the nahiya of Shafa al-Gharby. Likewise, the Palestinian Rural History Project records al-Taiyiba as a subsidiary of Umm al-Fahm.

In 1882 the PEF's Survey of Western Palestine found here "a modern ruined village with springs."

=== Jordanian period ===
In the wake of the 1948 Arab–Israeli War, and after the 1949 Armistice Agreements, al-Tayba came under Jordanian rule.

The Jordanian census of 1961 found 467 inhabitants in Taiyiba.

=== Post-1967 ===
Since the Six-Day War in 1967, al-Tayba has been under Israeli occupation.

== Bibliography ==
- Conder, C.R.; Kitchener, H.H. (1882). The Survey of Western Palestine: Memoirs of the Topography, Orography, Hydrography, and Archaeology. Vol. 2. London: Committee of the Palestine Exploration Fund.
- Dauphin, C. (1998). La Palestine byzantine, Peuplement et Populations. BAR International Series 726 (in French). Vol. III : Catalogue. Oxford: Archeopress. ISBN 0-860549-05-4.
- Government of Jordan, Department of Statistics (1964). First Census of Population and Housing. Volume I: Final Tables; General Characteristics of the Population (PDF).
- Hütteroth, W.-D.; Abdulfattah, K. (1977). Historical Geography of Palestine, Transjordan and Southern Syria in the Late 16th Century. Erlanger geographische Arbeiten. Vol. Sonderband 5. Erlangen, Germany: Vorstand der Fränkischen Geographischen Gesellschaft. ISBN 3-920405-41-2.
- Palmer, E.H. (1881). The Survey of Western Palestine: Arabic and English Name Lists Collected During the Survey by Lieutenants Conder and Kitchener, R. E. Transliterated and Explained by E.H. Palmer. Committee of the Palestine Exploration Fund.
- Zertal, Adam; Mirkam, Nivi (2016). The Manasseh Hill Country Survey. Vol. 3. Boston: BRILL. ISBN 978-9004312302.
