= Kufeirit =

- Municipality type D (Village council)

Arabic transcription(s)
  - Arabic: كفيرت
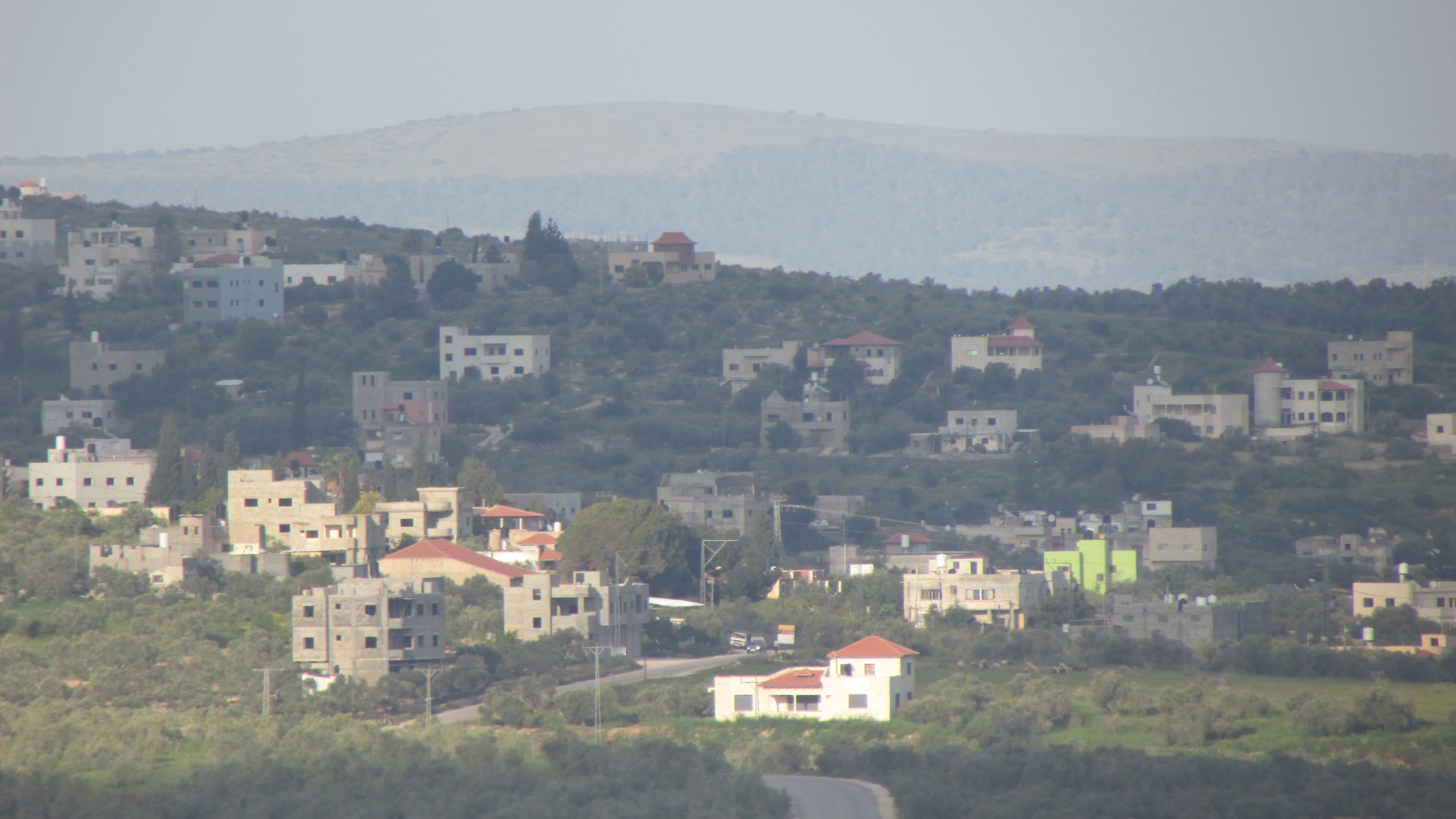

- Location of Kufeirit within Palestine
- Coordinates: 32°26′38″N 35°12′11″E
- Palestine grid: 169/206
- State: State of Palestine
- Governorate: Jenin

Government
  - Type: Village council

Population (2017)
  - Total: 3,068
- Name meaning: from personal name

Kufeirit (Arabic: كفيرت) is a Palestinian village in the West Bank, located 16 km west of the city of Jenin in the northern West Bank. According to the Palestinian Central Bureau of Statistics, the town had a population of 2,446 inhabitants in mid-year 2006 and 3,068 by 2017.

== History ==
Pottery sherds from the Iron Age II, Persian, Hellenistic, early and late Roman, Byzantine, early Muslim and the Medieval eras have been found here.

=== Ottoman era ===
Kufeirit, like the rest of Palestine, was incorporated into the Ottoman Empire in 1517, and in the census of 1596 it was a part of the nahiya ("subdistrict") of Jabal Sami which was under the administration of the liwa ("district") of Nablus. The village had a population of 29 households and 4 bachelors, all Muslim. The villagers paid a fixed tax-rate of 33,3%, on wheat, barley, summer crops, olive trees, beehives and/or goats, in addition to occasional revenues and a customary tax for people of Nablus area; a total of 10,000 akçe.

In 1838 the village (called Kufeireh) was noted as part of the esh–Sha'rawiyeh esh–Shurkiyeh ("the Eastern") District, north of Nablus.

In 1870, Victor Guérin noted the village on his travels in the region, as being less significant than neighbouring Ya'bad.

In 1870/1871 (1288 AH), an Ottoman census listed the village in the nahiya (sub-district) of al-Sha'rawiyya al-Sharqiyya.

In 1882, the PEF's Survey of Western Palestine (SWP) described Kefreireh as: "a good sized village on a hill at the edge of the Plain of Arrabeh, with a well on the east and olives."

=== British mandate era ===
In the 1922 census of Palestine, conducted by the British Mandate authorities, Kufairat had a population of 113 Muslims, increasing in the 1931 census to 154 Muslims in 28 houses.

In the 1945 statistics, the population of Kufeirat was 240 Muslims, with 732 dunams of land, according to an official land and population survey. Of this, 241 dunams were used for plantations and irrigable land, 200 dunams for cereals, while 6 dunams were built-up (urban) land.

=== Jordanian era ===
In the wake of the 1948 Arab–Israeli War, and after the 1949 Armistice Agreements, Kufeirit came under Jordanian rule.

In 1961, the population was 457 persons.

=== Post 1967 ===
Since the Six-Day War in 1967, Kufeirit has been under Israeli occupation. The population of Kufeirat in the 1967 census conducted by Israel was 583, of whom 109 originated from the Israeli territory.

== Bibliography ==
- Barron, J.B., ed. (1923). Palestine: Report and General Abstracts of the Census of 1922. Government of Palestine.
- Conder, C.R.; Kitchener, H.H. (1882). The Survey of Western Palestine: Memoirs of the Topography, Orography, Hydrography, and Archaeology. Vol. 2. London: Committee of the Palestine Exploration Fund.
- Government of Jordan, Department of Statistics (1964). First Census of Population and Housing. Volume I: Final Tables; General Characteristics of the Population (PDF).
- Government of Palestine, Department of Statistics (1945). Village Statistics, April, 1945.
- Guérin, V. (1874). Description Géographique Historique et Archéologique de la Palestine (in French). Vol. 2: Samarie, pt. 1. Paris: L'Imprimerie Nationale.
- Hadawi, S. (1970). Village Statistics of 1945: A Classification of Land and Area ownership in Palestine. Palestine Liberation Organization Research Center.
- Hütteroth, W.-D.; Abdulfattah, K. (1977). Historical Geography of Palestine, Transjordan and Southern Syria in the Late 16th Century. Erlanger Geographische Arbeiten, Sonderband 5. Erlangen, Germany: Vorstand der Fränkischen Geographischen Gesellschaft. ISBN 3-920405-41-2.
- Mills, E., ed. (1932). Census of Palestine 1931. Population of Villages, Towns and Administrative Areas. Jerusalem: Government of Palestine.
- Palmer, E.H. (1881). The Survey of Western Palestine: Arabic and English Name Lists Collected During the Survey by Lieutenants Conder and Kitchener, R. E. Transliterated and Explained by E.H. Palmer. Committee of the Palestine Exploration Fund.
- Robinson, E.; Smith, E. (1841). Biblical Researches in Palestine, Mount Sinai and Arabia Petraea: A Journal of Travels in the year 1838. Vol. 3. Boston: Crocker & Brewster.
- Zertal, A. (2004). The Manasseh Hill Country Survey. Vol. 1. Boston: BRILL. ISBN 9004137564.
