= Araqah =

- Municipality type D (Village council)

Arabic transcription(s)
  - Arabic: عرقه
  - Latin: al-Araqa (official) ’Araqa (unofficial)
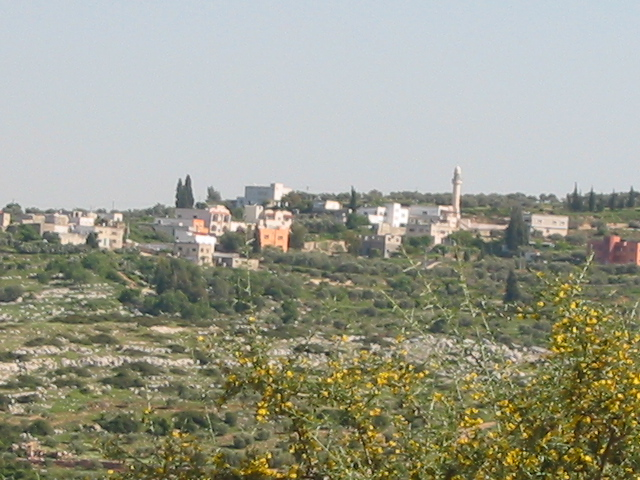
- Araqah as seen from the Shahak Industrial Park

- Location of Araqah within Palestine
- Coordinates: 32°28′16″N 35°12′02″E
- Palestine grid: 169/208
- State: State of Palestine
- Governorate: Jenin

Government
  - Type: Village council

Population (2017)
  - Total: 2,667
- Name meaning: The cliffs

Araqah (Arabic: عرقه) is a Palestinian village in the Jenin Governorate in the Northern area of the West Bank, located 15 kilometers West of Jenin. According to the Palestinian Central Bureau of Statistics, the village had a population of 2,667 inhabitants in 2017.

== History ==
Araqah was established in the 18th century, probably by the Abd el-Hadi family or under their auscipes.

Potsherds from the late Roman, Byzantine, early Muslim and the Middle Ages have been found here.

=== Ottoman era ===
Pottery remains from the early Ottoman era have also been found here.

In 1870, Victor Guérin described it as a small village, situated on a small hill, and divided into two quarters. In 1870/1871 (1288 AH), an Ottoman census listed the village in the nahiya of Shafa al-Gharby.

In 1882 the PEF's Survey of Western Palestine found that it was "a village of moderated size on a hill side, with a well to the south."

=== British Mandate era ===
In the 1922 census of Palestine, conducted by the British Mandate authorities, the village had a population of 168 Muslims, increasing slightly in the 1931 census to 219 Muslims, with 36 houses.

In 1944/5 statistics the population was 350 Muslims, with a total of 5,675 dunams of land, according to an official land and population survey. Of this, 462 dunams were used for plantations and irrigable land, 1,191 dunams for cereals, while 27 dunams were built-up (urban) land.

=== Jordanian era ===
After the 1948 Arab-Israeli War, Araqah came under Jordanian rule.

The Jordanian census of 1961 found 569 inhabitants.

=== Post-1967 ===
Araqah has been under Israeli occupation along with the rest of the West Bank since the 1967 Six-Day War.

On 27 April 2015 an eighteen-year-old youth from the village died after being shot the previous day by Israeli soldiers.

== Demography ==
=== Local origins ===
Some of Araqah's residents have origins in the Bayt Jibrin area, while others have origins in Transjordan.

== See also ==
- Timeline of the Israeli–Palestinian conflict, 2015

== Bibliography ==
- Barron, J.B., ed. (1923). Palestine: Report and General Abstracts of the Census of 1922. Government of Palestine.
- Conder, C.R.; Kitchener, H.H. (1882). The Survey of Western Palestine: Memoirs of the Topography, Orography, Hydrography, and Archaeology. Vol. 2. London: Committee of the Palestine Exploration Fund.
- Dauphin, C. (1998). La Palestine byzantine, Peuplement et Populations. BAR International Series 726 (in French). Vol. III : Catalogue. Oxford: Archeopress. ISBN 0-860549-05-4.
- Government of Jordan, Department of Statistics (1964). First Census of Population and Housing. Volume I: Final Tables; General Characteristics of the Population (PDF).
- Government of Palestine, Department of Statistics (1945). Village Statistics, April, 1945.
- Guérin, V. (1875). Description Géographique Historique et Archéologique de la Palestine (in French). Vol. 2: Samarie, pt. 2. Paris: L'Imprimerie Nationale.
- Hadawi, S. (1970). Village Statistics of 1945: A Classification of Land and Area ownership in Palestine. Palestine Liberation Organization Research Center.
- Mills, E., ed. (1932). Census of Palestine 1931. Population of Villages, Towns and Administrative Areas. Jerusalem: Government of Palestine.
- Palmer, E.H. (1881). The Survey of Western Palestine: Arabic and English Name Lists Collected During the Survey by Lieutenants Conder and Kitchener, R. E. Transliterated and Explained by E.H. Palmer. Committee of the Palestine Exploration Fund.
- Zertal, A. (2016). The Manasseh Hill Country Survey. Vol. 3. Boston: BRILL. ISBN 978-9004312302.
