= 'Anin =

- Municipality type D (Village council)

Arabic transcription(s)
  - Arabic: عانين
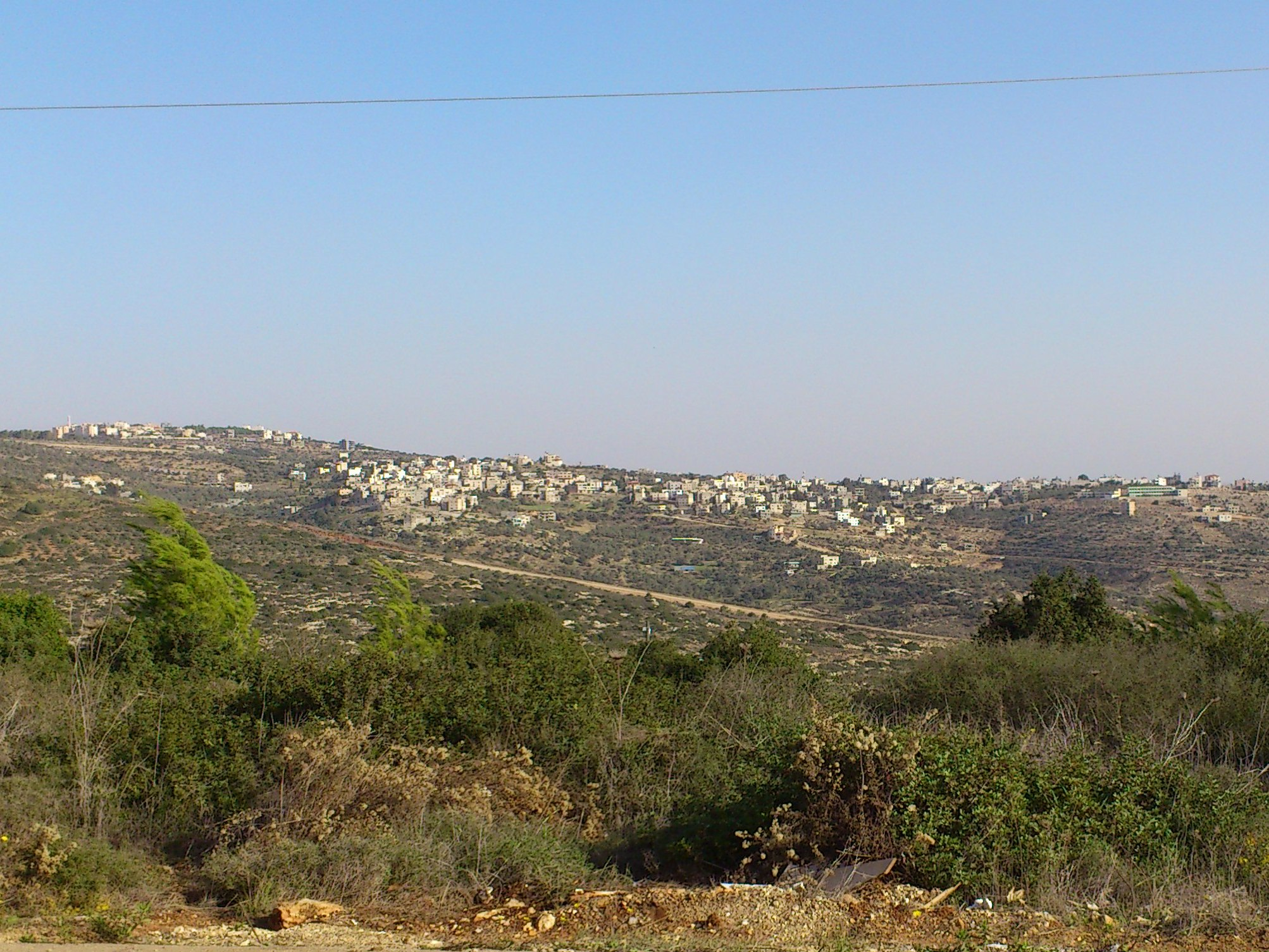

- Location of 'Anin within Palestine
- Coordinates: 32°30′05″N 35°10′04″E
- Palestine grid: 165/211
- State: State of Palestine
- Governorate: Jenin

Government
  - Type: Village council

Population (2017)
  - Total: 4,216
- Name meaning: from personal name, or possibly from fountain

'Anin (Arabic: عانين) is a Palestinian village in the West Bank governorate of Jenin. According to the Palestinian Central Bureau of Statistics, the village had a population of 4,216 inhabitants in 2017.

== History ==
Potsherds from Iron Age I, IA II, Persian, early and late Roman, Byzantine, early Muslim and the Middle Ages have been found here.

"Immediately north of the village is a rock-cut passage large enough to walk along, extending about 50 feet and lined with cement; it then becomes about a foot high. This leads out on to a flat surface of rock.(...) Two rock-cut tombs, now blocked, exist west of this."

The Reḥov mosaic inscription from the Byzantine period lists 'Ananin (עננין) among the Jewish settlements of the Sebaste district, whose inhabitants were exempt from agricultural laws governing produce because of the territory’s ambiguous status.

=== Ottoman era ===
In 1517 'Anin was incorporated into the Ottoman Empire with the rest of Palestine. During the 16th and 17th centuries, it belonged to the Turabay Emirate (1517-1683), which encompassed also the Jezreel Valley, Haifa, Jenin, Beit She'an Valley, northern Jabal Nablus, Bilad al-Ruha/Ramot Menashe, and the northern part of the Sharon plain. In the census of 1596 it was a part of the nahiya ("subdistrict") of Sahil Atlit which was under the administration of the liwa ("district") of Lajjun. The village had a population of 16 households, all Muslim. The villagers paid a fixed tax rate of 25% on wheat, barley, summer crops, olive trees, in addition to occasional revenues and a press for olive oil or grape syrup; a total of 3,600 akçe. Potsherds from the Ottoman era have also been found here.

In 1870/1871 (1288 AH), an Ottoman census listed the village in the nahiya of Shafa al-Gharby.

In 1882, the PEF's Survey of Western Palestine described Anin as: "a small village on a ridge, partly built of stone, with a small olive grove beneath it on the west, and two wells on that side. It has the appearance of an ancient site, having rock-cut tombs, and a curious channel for water."

=== British mandate era ===
In the 1922 census of Palestine, conducted by the British Mandate authorities, the village had a population of 360 Muslims, increasing in the 1931 census to 447 Muslims, in 68 houses.

In the 1944/5 statistics the population of Anin was 590 Muslims, with a total of 15,049 dunams of land, according to an official land and population survey. Of this, 1,769 dunams were used for plantations and irrigable land, 1,806 dunams for cereals, while 13 dunams were built-up (urban) land.

=== Jordanian era ===
After the 1948 Arab-Israeli War, 'Anin came under Jordanian rule.

The Jordanian census of 1961 found 752 inhabitants.

=== Post-1967 ===
'Anin has been under Israeli control along with the rest of the West Bank since the 1967 Six-Day War.

== Bibliography ==
- Barron, J.B., ed. (1923). Palestine: Report and General Abstracts of the Census of 1922. Government of Palestine.
- Conder, C.R.; Kitchener, H.H. (1882). The Survey of Western Palestine: Memoirs of the Topography, Orography, Hydrography, and Archaeology. Vol. 2. London: Committee of the Palestine Exploration Fund.
- Dauphin, C. (1998). La Palestine byzantine, Peuplement et Populations. BAR International Series 726 (in French). Vol. III : Catalogue. Oxford: Archeopress. ISBN 0-860549-05-4.
- Government of Jordan, Department of Statistics (1964). First Census of Population and Housing. Volume I: Final Tables; General Characteristics of the Population (PDF).
- Government of Palestine, Department of Statistics (1945). Village Statistics, April, 1945.
- Hadawi, S. (1970). Village Statistics of 1945: A Classification of Land and Area ownership in Palestine. Palestine Liberation Organization Research Center.
- Hütteroth, W.-D.; Abdulfattah, K. (1977). Historical Geography of Palestine, Transjordan and Southern Syria in the Late 16th Century. Erlanger Geographische Arbeiten, Sonderband 5. Erlangen, Germany: Vorstand der Fränkischen Geographischen Gesellschaft. ISBN 3-920405-41-2.
- Mills, E., ed. (1932). Census of Palestine 1931. Population of Villages, Towns and Administrative Areas. Jerusalem: Government of Palestine.
- Palmer, E.H. (1881). The Survey of Western Palestine: Arabic and English Name Lists Collected During the Survey by Lieutenants Conder and Kitchener, R. E. Transliterated and Explained by E.H. Palmer. Committee of the Palestine Exploration Fund.
- Zertal, A. (2016). The Manasseh Hill Country Survey. Vol. 3. Boston: BRILL. ISBN 978-9004312302.
