= Mirka, Jenin =

Mirka
- Municipality type D (Village council)

Arabic transcription(s)
  - Arabic: مِركة
- Location of Mirka within Palestine
- Coordinates: 32°23′48″N 35°14′17″E
- Palestine grid: 172/200
- State: State of Palestine
- Governorate: Jenin

Government
  - Type: Village council

Population (2017)
  - Total: 2,203
- Name meaning: from personal name, or Neby Murakin, the prophet Murakin

Mirka (Arabic: مِركة) is a Palestinian village in the West Bank, located 12 km (7.5 mi) Southwest of the city of Jenin in the northern West Bank. According to the Palestinian Central Bureau of Statistics, the town had a population of 1,555 inhabitants in mid-year 2006 and 2,203 by 2017.

== History ==
Just southeast of the village (at grid 172/199) is a site where sherds mainly from the Persian era have been found.

Pottery sherds from the early and late Roman, Byzantine, early Muslim and Medieval eras have been found at the village site.

Locals say they have origins in Arraba.

=== Ottoman era ===
Mirka, like all of Palestine, was incorporated into the Ottoman Empire in 1517. In the 1596 tax registers, it was part of the nahiya ("subdistrict") of Jabal Sami, part of the larger Sanjak of Nablus. It had a population of 9 households, all Muslims. The inhabitants paid a fixed tax rate of 33,3% on agricultural products, including wheat, barley, summer crops, olive trees, goats and beehives, a press for olive oil or grape syrup, in addition to occasional revenues and a fixed tax for people of Nablus area; a total of 3,780 akçe.

In the 1882 PEF's Survey of Western Palestine (SWP), Merkeh is described as: "a hamlet on the side of a bare hill."

=== British Mandate era ===
In the 1922 census of Palestine conducted by the British Mandate authorities, Merka had a population 142 Muslims, increasing in the 1931 census to 167 Muslim, in a total of 32 houses.

In the 1945 statistics, the population was 230 Muslims, with a total of 4,396 dunams of land, according to an official land and population survey. Of this, 546 dunams were used for plantations and irrigable land, 1,300 dunams were for cereals, while a total of 26 dunams were built-up, urban land.

=== Jordanian era ===
In the wake of the 1948 Arab–Israeli War, and after the 1949 Armistice Agreements, Mirka came under Jordanian rule.

In 1961, the population was 303.

=== Post-1967 ===
Since the Six-Day War in 1967, Mirka has been under Israeli occupation, and according to the Israeli census of that year, the population of Mirka stood at 142, of whom 59 were registered as having come from Israel.

== Bibliography ==
- Barron, J.B., ed. (1923). Palestine: Report and General Abstracts of the Census of 1922. Government of Palestine.
- Conder, C.R.; Kitchener, H.H. (1882). The Survey of Western Palestine: Memoirs of the Topography, Orography, Hydrography, and Archaeology. Vol. 2. London: Committee of the Palestine Exploration Fund.
- Government of Jordan, Department of Statistics (1964). First Census of Population and Housing. Volume I: Final Tables; General Characteristics of the Population (PDF).
- Government of Palestine, Department of Statistics (1945). Village Statistics, April, 1945.
- Hadawi, S. (1970). Village Statistics of 1945: A Classification of Land and Area ownership in Palestine. Palestine Liberation Organization Research Center.
- Hütteroth, W.-D.; Abdulfattah, K. (1977). Historical Geography of Palestine, Transjordan and Southern Syria in the Late 16th Century. Erlanger Geographische Arbeiten, Sonderband 5. Erlangen, Germany: Vorstand der Fränkischen Geographischen Gesellschaft. ISBN 3-920405-41-2.
- Mills, E., ed. (1932). Census of Palestine 1931. Population of Villages, Towns and Administrative Areas. Jerusalem: Government of Palestine.
- Palmer, E.H. (1881). The Survey of Western Palestine: Arabic and English Name Lists Collected During the Survey by Lieutenants Conder and Kitchener, R. E. Transliterated and Explained by E.H. Palmer. Committee of the Palestine Exploration Fund.
- Zertal, A. (2004). The Manasseh Hill Country Survey. Vol. 1. Boston: BRILL. ISBN 9004137564.
