= Dahiyat Sabah al-Kheir =

- Municipality type D (Village council)

Arabic transcription(s)
  - Arabic: ضاحية صباح الخير
- Location of Dahiyat Sabah al-Kheir within Palestine
- Coordinates: 32°29′09.00″N 35°17′58.10″E
- State: State of Palestine
- Governorate: Jenin

Government
  - Type: Village council

Population (2006)
  - Total: 1,457

Dahiyat Sabah al-Kheir (Arabic: ضاحية صباح الخير) is a Palestinian village in the Jenin Governorate in the northern West Bank, located 4 kilometers north of Jenin. According to the Palestinian Central Bureau of Statistics, the town had a population of 1,457 inhabitants in mid-year 2006.

In the wake of the 1948 Arab–Israeli War, and after the 1949 Armistice Agreements, Dahiyat Sabah al-Kheir came under Jordanian rule.

Doring the Six-Day War in 1967, Dahiya Sabah al-Kheir came under Israeli occupation. As part of the Oslo Accords in 1995 Dahiya Sabah al-Kheir was handed over to the Palestinian Authority.
