= Kafr Ra'i =

- Municipality type C

Arabic transcription(s)
  - Arabic: كفر راعي
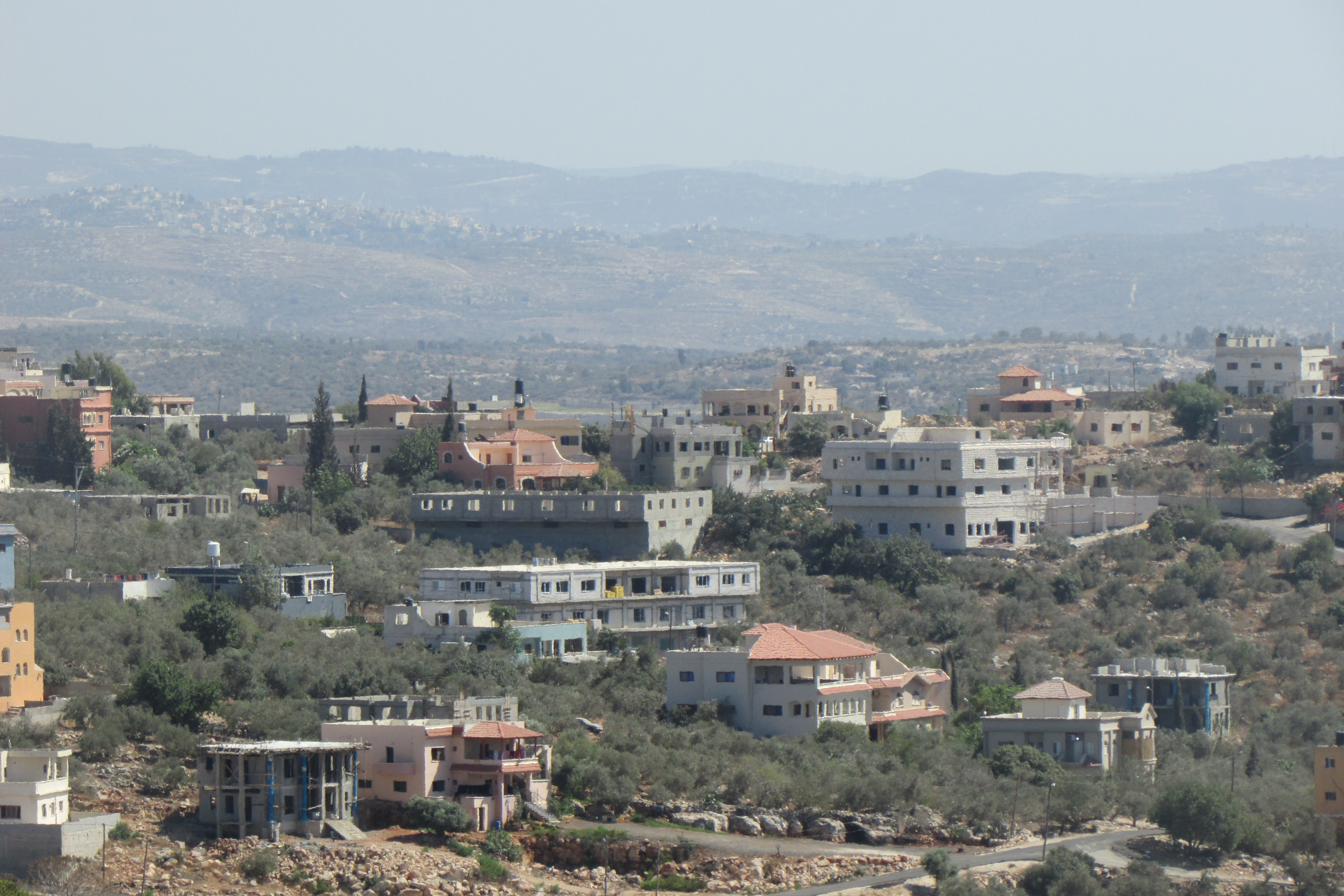

- Location of Kafr Ra'i within Palestine
- Coordinates: 32°22′34″N 35°09′18″E
- Palestine grid: 164/197
- State: State of Palestine
- Governorate: Jenin

Government
  - Type: Municipality

Population (2017)
  - Total: 8,471
- Name meaning: "Village of the Shepherd"

Kafr Ra'i (Arabic: كفر راعي, transliterated Kafr Râày) is a Palestinian town in the Jenin Governorate of the State of Palestine, in the northern West Bank, located 22 kilometers (11 miles) southwest of the city of Jenin. According to the Palestinian Central Bureau of Statistics, Kafr Ra'i had a population of 7,364 in the 2007 census and 8,471 by 2017.

== Etymology ==
"Kafr Ra'i" translates as "Village of the Shepherd" in Arabic.

== History ==
Pottery remains from the Byzantine, early Muslim and the Middle Ages have been found here.

In 1265, after the Mamluks had defeated the Crusaders, Kafr Ra'i was mentioned among the estates which Sultan Baybars granted his followers. The village was divided equally between two of his emirs: Shuja' al-Din Tughril al-Shibli and Ala' al-Din Kundughdi al-Hubayshi. The village was mentioned in a corpus of Mamluk legal documents stored in Jerusalem dated to 1305-1308; the subject of the document was a resident of the village who belonged to the Banu Haritha (the tribe of the Turabay dynasty) prevalent in the Jenin area at that time.

=== Ottoman era ===
The village was incorporated into the Ottoman Empire with the rest of Palestine in 1517. In the 1596 Ottoman tax records, it appeared under the name of Kafr Ra’i, located in the Nahiya Qaqun, in the Nablus Sanjak. It had a population of 35 families, all Muslim. They paid a fixed tax-rate of 33.3% on agricultural products, including wheat, barley, summer crops, olive trees, goats and beehives, in addition to occasional revenues and a press for olive oil or grape syrup; a total of 7,914 akçe.

In 1838, it was noted as a Muslim village, Kefr Ra'y, located in the esh–Sha'rawiyeh esh–Shurkiyeh District. In 1870 Victor Guérin noted it as a village, situated on a hill, NNE of Rama. In 1882, the PEF's Survey of Western Palestine described Kafr Ra'i as "a large village on high ground, with good olives to the south and two wells." In 1871 (1288 AH), an Ottoman census listed the village, divided into two quarters- or census registration unites, in the nahiya (sub-district) of al-Sha'rawiyya al-Sharqiyya.

=== British Mandate era ===
British forces captured Palestine, including Kafr Ra'i, in 1917, during World War I, and thereafter established the British Mandate of Palestine. In the 1922 British census, Kafr Ra'i had a population of 1,088 Muslims. The population rose to 1,470, still all Muslims, living in 334 houses, in the 1931 census.

In the 1945 statistics, the population was 2,150, all Muslims, with 35,868 dunams of land, according to an official land and population survey. Of the village's lands, 3,254 dunams were used for plantations and irrigable land, 6,254 dunams for cereals, while 36 dunams were built-up (urban) areas.

=== Jordanian era ===
Kafr Ra'i came under Jordanian rule during the 1948 Arab–Israeli War.

In 1961, the population was 2,823.

=== 1967, aftermath ===
Kafr Ra'i has been under Israeli occupation since the 1967 Six-Day War.

On 2 February 1989, during the First Intifada, Israeli soldiers had been clashing with Palestinians in the nearby village of Fahma and when four teenagers from Kafr Ra'i approached the village, Israeli soldiers sped and shot towards them in their vehicle. As the boys fled, one of them, 14-year-old Salameh Tahsin Sobeih, was shot and fell down. Witnesses reported that some ten soldiers proceeded to kick Salameh and drag him to their vehicle. A Palestinian doctor asked to see Salameh, but was denied. Members of Kafr Ra'i's village council found Salameh's body with three gunshot wounds and bruises, a bloodied mouth and broken nose, at the local military headquarters, where soldiers told them he was being interrogated. A funeral was held for Salameh the following day in Kafr Ra'i, with attendees also coming from Arraba and Fahma.

== Demographics ==
In the 1997 census by the Palestinian Central Bureau of Statistics (PCBS), Kafr Ra'i had a population of 5,824. Palestinian refugees accounted for 27.6% of the inhabitants. In the 2007 PCBS census, the population grew to 7,364, living in 1,395 households with each household containing an average of between five and six members. The number of housing units was 1,559. The gender ratio was 49.7% female and 50.3% male.

== Culture ==
The Kafr Raʿī Cherry Festival (مهرجان الكرز) is a recurring cultural event celebrating the village's association with cherry cultivation and the local agricultural season, it was launched in 2016. The festival typically features exhibitions of cherries and related products, alongside folk music, dance, and community activities, with the stated goal of promoting rural heritage, supporting local farmers, and attracting visitors from surrounding areas.

== Bibliography ==
- Barron, J.B., ed. (1923). Palestine: Report and General Abstracts of the Census of 1922. Government of Palestine.
- Conder, C.R.; Kitchener, H.H. (1882). The Survey of Western Palestine: Memoirs of the Topography, Orography, Hydrography, and Archaeology. Vol. 2. London: Committee of the Palestine Exploration Fund.
- Government of Jordan, Department of Statistics (1964). First Census of Population and Housing. Volume I: Final Tables; General Characteristics of the Population (PDF).
- Government of Palestine, Department of Statistics (1945). Village Statistics, April, 1945.
- Guérin, V. (1875). Description Géographique Historique et Archéologique de la Palestine (in French). Vol. 2: Samarie, pt. 2. Paris: L'Imprimerie Nationale.
- Hadawi, S. (1970). Village Statistics of 1945: A Classification of Land and Area ownership in Palestine. Palestine Liberation Organization Research Center.
- Hall, M. Clement (2009). Intifada. Lulu. ISBN 9780557202546.
- Hütteroth, W.-D.; Abdulfattah, K. (1977). Historical Geography of Palestine, Transjordan and Southern Syria in the Late 16th Century. Erlanger Geographische Arbeiten, Sonderband 5. Erlangen, Germany: Vorstand der Fränkischen Geographischen Gesellschaft. ISBN 3-920405-41-2.
- Ibn al-Furat (1971). Jonathan Riley-Smith (ed.). Ayyubids, Mamluks and Crusaders: Selections from the "Tarikh Al-duwal Wal-muluk" of Ibn Al-Furat : the Text, the Translation. Vol. 2. Translation by Malcolm Cameron Lyons, Ursula Lyons. Cambridge: W. Heffer.
- Mills, E., ed. (1932). Census of Palestine 1931. Population of Villages, Towns and Administrative Areas. Jerusalem: Government of Palestine.
- Palmer, E.H. (1881). The Survey of Western Palestine: Arabic and English Name Lists Collected During the Survey by Lieutenants Conder and Kitchener, R. E. Transliterated and Explained by E.H. Palmer. Committee of the Palestine Exploration Fund.
- Rapoport, Yossef (2025). Becoming Arab: The Formation of Arab Identity in the Medieval Middle East. Princeton: Princeton University Press. ISBN 9780691210636.
- Robinson, E.; Smith, E. (1841). Biblical Researches in Palestine, Mount Sinai and Arabia Petraea: A Journal of Travels in the year 1838. Vol. 3. Boston: Crocker & Brewster.
- Zertal, A. (2016). The Manasseh Hill Country Survey. Vol. 3. Boston: BRILL. ISBN 978-9004312302.
