= Jenin Governorate =

Governorate of Palestine

Coordinates: 32.46°N 35.3°E

- Governorate
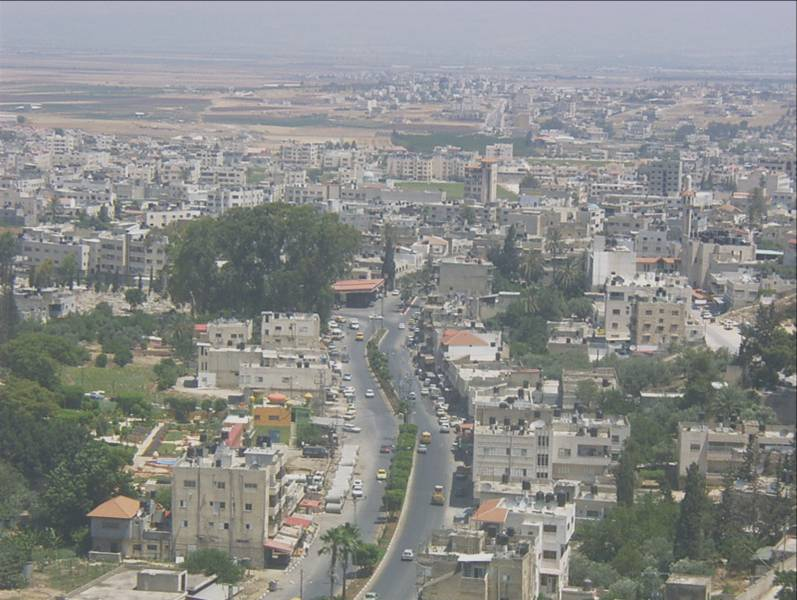

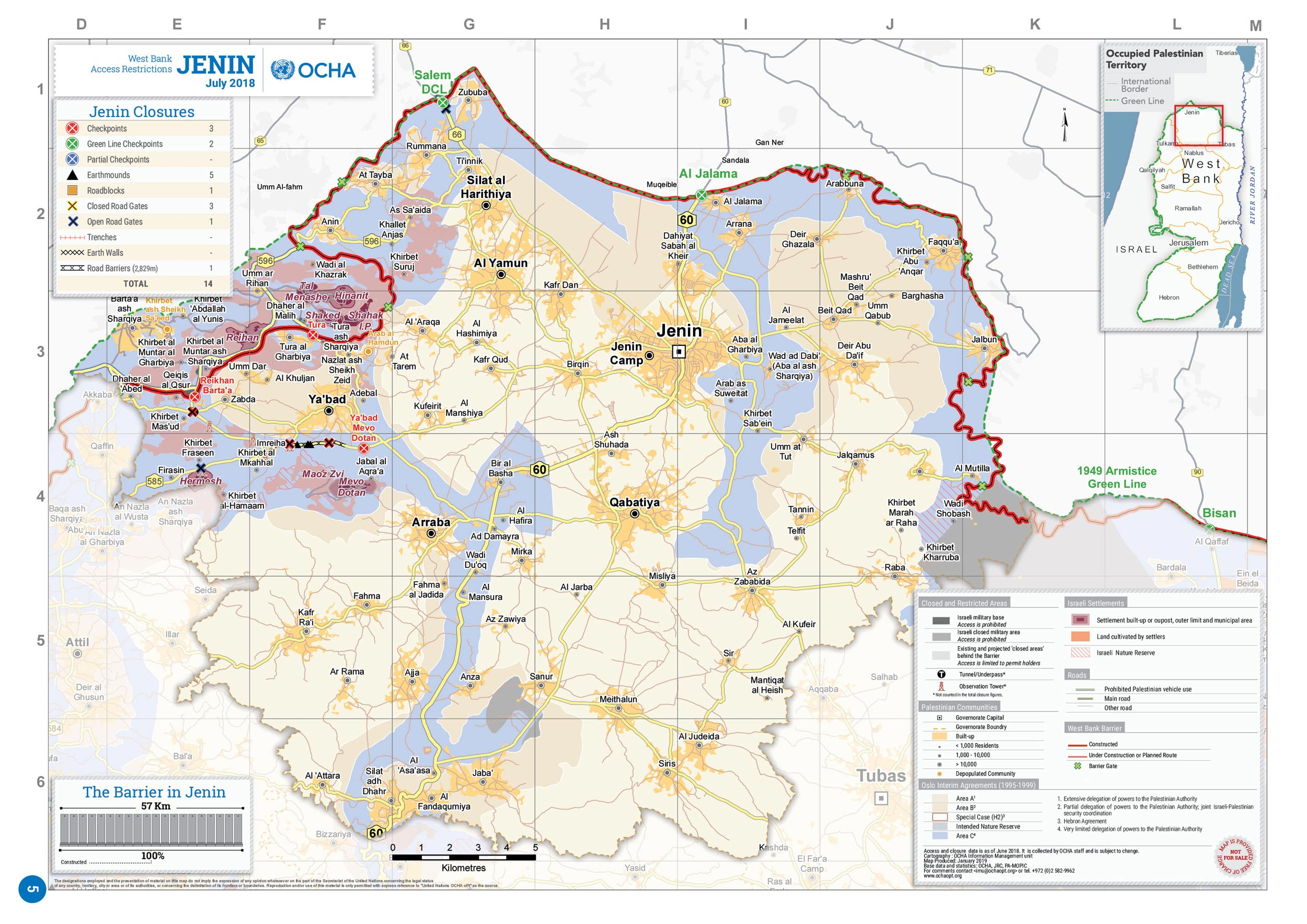
- 2018 United Nations map of the area, showing the Israeli occupation arrangements in the governorate
- Interactive map of Jenin Governorate
- Country: Palestine

Area
  - Total: 583 km^{2} (225 sq mi)

Population (2017)
  - Total: 314,866
- This figure excludes the Israeli West Bank Settlements

The Jenin Governorate (Arabic: محافظة جنين, romanized: Muḥāfaẓat Ǧanīn) is one of 16 governorates of Palestine. It covers the northern extremity of the West Bank, including the area around the city of Jenin, which is the district capital or muhfaza of the district.

According to the Palestinian Central Bureau of Statistics 2017 Census, the governorate had a population of 314,866. This is an increase from the reported population of 256,619 in the 2007 Census living in 47,437 households. 100,701 inhabitants (or 39%) were under the age of 63 (or 31%) were registered refugees. According to the Palestinian Central Bureau of Statistics 1997 Census, the Governorate had a population of 195,074.

It is the only governorate in the West Bank where the majority of control of land is under the Palestinian National Authority. Four Israeli settlements were evacuated as a part of Israel's unilateral disengagement plan in 2005.

== History ==
=== Ottoman period ===
In 1517, when Ottoman Sultan Selim I annexed the area, it was awarded as fief to Emir Tarabay ibn Qaraja, chieftain of the Bani Hareth, who supported the Ottomans by contributing guides and scouts. the Tarabays were granted the territory of the Sanjak ("District") of Lajjun, which was a part of the province of Damascus, and encompassed the Jezreel Valley, northern Samaria, and a part of the north-central coastline of Palestine as its territory. This area was called "Bilad Haritha" and was composed of four sub-districts (Jenin, Sahel Atlit, Sha'ra, and Shafa), and encompassed a total of 55 villages, including Haifa, Jenin, and Baysan.

Following the dissolution of the Turabay Emirate, the region later forming the Tubas Governorate belonged to Jabal Nablus. Like other regions of Nablus' peripheral hinterland, it followed the provincial center, led by a closely knit web of economic, social and political relations between Nablus’ urban notables and the city’s surroundings. With the help of rural trading partners, these urban notables established trading monopolies that transformed Jabal Nablus’ autarkic economy into an export-driven market, shipping vast quantities of cash crops and finished goods to off-shore markets. Increasing demand for these commodities in the Ottoman Empire’s urban centers and in Europe spurred demographic growth and settlement expansion in the lowlands surrounding Jabal Nablus.

=== Post-1967 ===
During the first six months of the First Intifada the Israeli army shot dead 59 people in Jenin Governorate.

Jenin Governorate historical population
Year	Pop.	±%
1997	195,074	—
2007	256,619	+31.5%
2017	314,866	+22.7%

== Localities ==
=== Cities ===
- Jenin (includes Jenin camp)
- Qabatiya

=== Municipalities ===
- Ajjah
- Arrabah
- Burqin
- Dahiyat Sabah al-Khei
- Deir Abu Da'if
- Jaba
- Kafr Dan
- Kafr Rai
- Meithalun
- Silat al-Harithiya
- Silat ad-Dhahr
- Ya'bad
- al-Yamun
- Zababdeh

=== Village councils ===
The following is a list of Palestinian localities in the Jenin Governorate with populations of more than 1,000.

- 'Anin
- Anzah
- Araqah
- Arranah
- al-Attara
- Barta'a ash-Sharqiyah
- Beit Qad
- Bir al-Basha
- Deir Ghazaleh
- Fahma
- Fandaqumiya
- Faqqua
- Jalamah
- Jalbun
- Jalqamus
- Judeida
- Kufeirit
- Mirka
- Misilyah
- al-Mughayyir
- Nazlet Zeid
- Rummanah
- Sanur
- ash-Shuhada
- Sir
- at-Tayba
- Ti'inik
- Tura al-Gharbiya
- Umm ar-Rihan
- Umm at-Tut
- Zububa

== See also ==
- Governorates of Palestine
