= Bir al-Basha =

- Municipality type D (Village council)

Arabic transcription(s)
  - Arabic: بئر الباشا
  - Latin: Bir al-Basha (official); Beer al-Basha (unofficial)
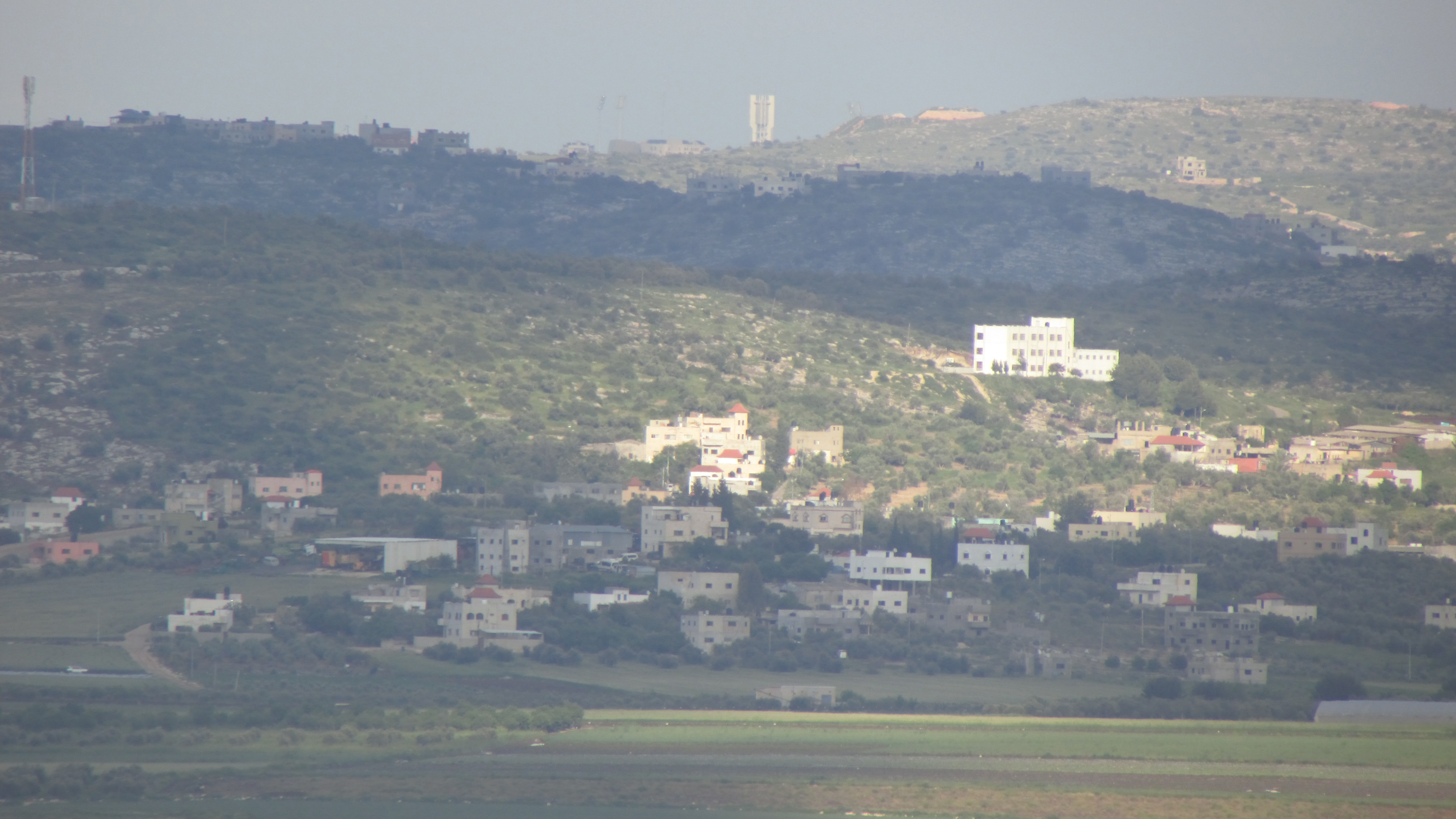
- Bir al-Basha

- Location of Bir al-Basha within Palestine
- Coordinates: 32°25′21″N 35°13′47″E
- Palestine grid: 171/203
- State: State of Palestine
- Governorate: Jenin

Government
  - Type: Village council

Population (2017)
  - Total: 1,725

Bir al-Basha (Arabic: بئر الباشا) is a Palestinian village in the northern part of the West Bank, located 15 km southwest of the city of Jenin. According to the Palestinian Central Bureau of Statistics, the town had a population of 1,307 inhabitants in mid-year 2006 and 1,725 by 2017.

It is adjacent to the archaeological site of Tel Dothan.

== History ==
In the wake of the 1948 Arab–Israeli War, and after the 1949 Armistice Agreements, Bir al-Basha came under Jordanian rule.

Since the Six-Day War in 1967, Bir al-Basha has been under Israeli occupation.
