= Ash-Shuhada =

ash-Shuhada
- Municipality type D (Village council)

Arabic transcription(s)
  - Arabic: مثلث الشهداء
- Location of ash-Shuhada within Palestine
- Coordinates: 32°25′48″N 35°16′14″E
- Palestine grid: 175/203
- State: State of Palestine
- Governorate: Jenin

Government
  - Type: Village council

Population (2017)
  - Total: 2,299

Ash-Shuhada (Arabic: مثلث الشهداء, martyrs' triangle) is a Palestinian village in the Jenin Governorate of Palestine, located 5 km southwest of the city of Jenin, in the northern West Bank. According to the Palestinian Central Bureau of Statistics, the town had a population of 1,738 inhabitants in mid-year 2006 and 2,299 by 2017.

== History ==
Just east of the modern village (at grid 1758/2041), large amounts of pottery sherds have been found, all dating to the Middle Bronze Age IIB.

In the wake of the 1948 Arab–Israeli War, and after the 1949 Armistice Agreements, Ash-Shuhada came under Jordanian rule.

Since the Six-Day War in 1967, Ash-Shuhada has been under Israeli occupation.

== Bibliography ==
- Zertal, A. (2004). The Manasseh Hill Country Survey. Vol. 1. Boston: BRILL. ISBN 9004137564.
