= Al-Mughayyir, Jenin =

al-Mughayyir
- Municipality type D (Village council)

Arabic transcription(s)
  - Arabic: المُغير
- Location of al-Mughayyir within Palestine
- Coordinates: 32°25′18″N 35°23′06″E
- Palestine grid: 186/204
- State: State of Palestine
- Governorate: Jenin
- Founded: mid-19th century

Government
  - Type: Village council

Population (2017)
  - Total: 3,249
- Name meaning: The caves

Al-Mughayyir, also spelled al-Mughaiyir (Arabic: المُغير) is a Palestinian village in the Jenin Governorate in the northern West Bank, located 12 km southeast of the city of Jenin. According to the Palestinian Central Bureau of Statistics, the village had a population of 2,240 inhabitants in mid-year 2006 and 3,249 by 2017.

== History ==
Al-Mughayyir was established by shepehrds from Deir Jarir and from Marj Ibn Amer, probably around the mid-19th century, around an old ruin.

In 1882, the PEF's Survey of Western Palestine described the village as "a small place on a rocky hill top. The water supply is by means of rain water cisterns. The houses are of stone and mud."

=== British Mandate era ===
In the 1922 census of Palestine conducted by the British Mandate authorities, Mughair had a population 94 Muslims, increasing in the 1931 census to 156 Muslim, in a total of 31 houses.

In the 1945 statistics the population was 220 Muslims, with a total of 18,049 dunams of land, according to an official land and population survey. Of this, 711 dunams were used for plantations and irrigable land, 5,487 dunams were for cereals, while a total of 6 dunams were built-up, urban land.

=== Jordanian era ===
In the wake of the 1948 Arab–Israeli War, and after the 1949 Armistice Agreements, Al-Mughayyir came under Jordanian rule.

In 1961, the population was 390.

=== Post-1967 ===
Since the Six-Day War in 1967, Al-Mughayyir has been under Israeli occupation.

== Bibliography ==
- Barron, J.B., ed. (1923). Palestine: Report and General Abstracts of the Census of 1922. Government of Palestine.
- Conder, C.R.; Kitchener, H.H. (1882). The Survey of Western Palestine: Memoirs of the Topography, Orography, Hydrography, and Archaeology. Vol. 2. London: Committee of the Palestine Exploration Fund.
- Government of Jordan, Department of Statistics (1964). First Census of Population and Housing. Volume I: Final Tables; General Characteristics of the Population (PDF).
- Government of Palestine, Department of Statistics (1945). Village Statistics, April, 1945.
- Hadawi, S. (1970). Village Statistics of 1945: A Classification of Land and Area ownership in Palestine. Palestine Liberation Organization Research Center. Archived from the original on 2018-12-08.
- Mills, E., ed. (1932). Census of Palestine 1931. Population of Villages, Towns and Administrative Areas. Jerusalem: Government of Palestine.
- Palmer, E.H. (1881). The Survey of Western Palestine: Arabic and English Name Lists Collected During the Survey by Lieutenants Conder and Kitchener, R. E. Transliterated and Explained by E.H. Palmer. Committee of the Palestine Exploration Fund.
