= Arabbuna =

- Municipality type D (Village council)

Arabic transcription(s)
  - Arabic: عربونة
- Location of Arabbuna within Palestine
- Coordinates: 32°30′43″N 35°21′47″E
- Palestine grid: 184/213
- State: State of Palestine
- Governorate: Jenin

Government
  - Type: Village council

Population (2017)
  - Total: 1,025
- Name meaning: 'earnest money' in Arabic

'Arabbuna (Arabic: عربّونة) is a Palestinian village in the West Bank governorate of Jenin. The village is located 9 km north of the city of Jenin, south of the West Bank separation barrier and according to the Palestinian Central Bureau of Statistics (PCBS) the village had a population of 1,025 in 2017. Prehistoric flint tools from the Upper and Middle Paleolithic period were found south of the village. Archaeological remains from the Byzantine era were found in the village. It is offered as the location of settlement called "Araba", mentioned by Eusebius in the 4th century CE.

== Geography ==
Arabbuna is located 3 km northwest of Faqqua and 2 km northeast of Deir Ghazaleh. The village houses are situated on a hill at the foot of Mount Faqqua, a section of Mount Gilboa (known as Mount Gibborim in Hebrew), bordered on the west by the Huhit river, on the west by Wadi Abu Jabir, on the north by Mount Faqqua and on the south by a rivulet of Wadi Abi Jabir.

== History ==
=== Archeology ===
Archeologists have found flint tools south of 'Arabbuna. These tools dated to the Upper Paleolithic and Middle Paleolithic periods (300,000 to 10,000 years BP). The tools from the former belong to the Mousterian culture. The village itself is situated on an ancient site. Old stones have been reused in buildings, fences and walls of terraces. Rock cuttings are scattered between houses and orchards. Some of these are identified as ancient tombs. Today the residents of 'Arabbuna use these rock cuttings for storage. A small amount of potsherds and glassware were found in the village and are dated to the Byzantine era. Therefore the village may be the location of a settlement known as "Araba" which existed in the time of Eusebius from the 4th century CE.

=== Ottoman era ===
'Arabbuna, like the rest of Palestine, was incorporated into the Ottoman Empire in 1517. During the 16th and 17th centuries, it belonged to the Turabay Emirate (1517-1683), which encompassed also the Jezreel Valley, Haifa, Jenin, Beit She'an Valley, northern Jabal Nablus, Bilad al-Ruha/Ramot Menashe, and the northern part of the Sharon plain. In the census of 1596, 'Arrabuna appeared as 'Arabbuni, located in the nahiya of Sara in the liwa of Lajjun. It had a population of 14 households, all Muslim. They paid a fixed tax rate of 25 % on agricultural products, including wheat, barley, summer crops, goats and beehives, in addition to occasional revenues; a total of 4,500 akçe.

In 1838 it was noted as a place N 60° E of Jenin.

In 1870 Victor Guérin found Arabbuna to be a small village, and further "south of this village, the foundation of an ancient building, which he does not appear to have examined." In 1870/1871 (1288 AH), an Ottoman census listed the village in the nahiya (sub-district) of Shafa al-Qibly.

=== British Mandate era ===
In the 1922 census of Palestine, conducted by the British Mandate authorities, the village had a population of 136 Muslims, increasing slightly in the 1931 census to 138 Muslims, in 24 households.

In the 1944/5 statistics, the population was 210, all Muslim, with a total of 6,772 dunams of land, according to an official land and population survey. Of this, 256 dunams were used for plantations and irrigable land, 3,607 dunams for cereals, while 22 dunams were built-up (urban) land.

=== Jordanian era ===
After the 1948 Arab–Israeli War and the 1949 Armistice Agreements, Arabbuna came under Jordanian rule.

In 1961, the population was 298.

=== Post-1967 ===
Since the Six-Day War in 1967, Arabbuna has been under Israeli occupation. The population of 'Arrabuna in the 1967 census conducted by Israel was 270, of whom 42 originated from the Israeli territory.

== Bibliography ==
- Barron, J.B., ed. (1923). Palestine: Report and General Abstracts of the Census of 1922. Government of Palestine.
- Conder, C.R.; Kitchener, H.H. (1882). The Survey of Western Palestine: Memoirs of the Topography, Orography, Hydrography, and Archaeology. Vol. 2. London: Committee of the Palestine Exploration Fund.
- Dauphin, C. (1998). La Palestine byzantine, Peuplement et Populations. BAR International Series 726 (in French). Vol. III : Catalogue. Oxford: Archeopress. ISBN 0-860549-05-4.
- Government of Jordan, Department of Statistics (1964). First Census of Population and Housing. Volume I: Final Tables; General Characteristics of the Population (PDF).
- Government of Palestine, Department of Statistics (1945). Village Statistics, April, 1945.
- Guérin, V. (1874). Description Géographique Historique et Archéologique de la Palestine (in French). Vol. 2: Samarie, pt. 1. Paris: L'Imprimerie Nationale.
- Hadawi, S. (1970). Village Statistics of 1945: A Classification of Land and Area ownership in Palestine. Palestine Liberation Organization Research Center.
- Hütteroth, W.-D.; Abdulfattah, K. (1977). Historical Geography of Palestine, Transjordan and Southern Syria in the Late 16th Century. Erlanger Geographische Arbeiten, Sonderband 5. Erlangen, Germany: Vorstand der Fränkischen Geographischen Gesellschaft. ISBN 3-920405-41-2.
- Mills, E., ed. (1932). Census of Palestine 1931. Population of Villages, Towns and Administrative Areas. Jerusalem: Government of Palestine.
- Palmer, E.H. (1881). The Survey of Western Palestine: Arabic and English Name Lists Collected During the Survey by Lieutenants Conder and Kitchener, R. E. Transliterated and Explained by E.H. Palmer. Committee of the Palestine Exploration Fund.
- Robinson, E.; Smith, E. (1841). Biblical Researches in Palestine, Mount Sinai and Arabia Petraea: A Journal of Travels in the year 1838. Vol. 3. Boston: Crocker & Brewster.
