= Beit Qad =

- Municipality type D (Village council)

Arabic transcription(s)
  - Arabic: بيت قاد
- Location of Beit Qad within Palestine
- Coordinates: 32°28′19″N 35°21′45″E
- Palestine grid: 183/208
- State: State of Palestine
- Governorate: Jenin

Government
  - Type: Village council

Population (2017)
  - Total: 1,538
- Name meaning: Beit Kâd: the house of Kâd

Beit Qad (Arabic: بيت قاد) is a Palestinian rural village in the West Bank governorate of Jenin. The village is located 5 km from the city of Jenin and according to the Palestinian Central Bureau of Statistics (PCBS) in 2017 it had a population of 1,538.

== History ==
The village is associated by some scholars with a biblical locality in the Kingdom of Israel, located between the city of Jezreel and the kingdom's capital Samaria. It is mentioned in the Book of Kings as Beth Ekad of the Shepherds (Hebrew: בֵּית-עֵקֶד הָרֹעִים) which can be translated as "meeting place of the shepherds". In this place, Jehu, king of Israel, slaughtered 42 relatives of Ahaziah, king of Judah. The village is also associated with a village mentioned in the Onomasticon (Gazetteer) of the Greek historian Eusebius called Beth Ekamat.

Some intact Roman buildings can be found in the village, and ceramics from the Byzantine era have also been found there.

=== Ottoman era ===
Beit Qad, like the rest of Palestine, was incorporated into the Ottoman Empire in 1517. During the 16th and 17th centuries, it belonged to the Turabay Emirate (1517–1683), which encompassed also the Jezreel Valley, Haifa, Jenin, Beit She'an Valley, northern Jabal Nablus, Bilad al-Ruha/Ramot Menashe, and the northern part of the Sharon plain.

In the census of 1596, Beit Qad appeared in the nahiya of Jenin in the liwa of Lajjun. It had a population of 20 households, all Muslim. They paid a fixed tax rate of 25% on agricultural products, including wheat, barley, summer crops, olive trees, goats and beehives, in addition to occasional revenues; a total of 9,500 akçe. Beit Qad was described by the census as a hamlet.

In 1838, Beit Kad was noted as one of a range of villages round a height, the other villages being named as Deir Abu Da'if, Fuku'a, Deir Ghuzal and Araneh.

In 1870 Victor Guérin found the village to have 200 inhabitants. In 1882, the PEF's Survey of Western Palestine (SWP) described Beit Kad as “a small village on a knoll near the plain. It has a large cemented cistern, now broken. The houses are of stone and mud.”

In 1870/1871 (1288 AH), an Ottoman census listed the village in the nahiya (sub-district) of Shafa al-Qibly.

=== British era ===
In the 1922 census of Palestine the population of the village was 199 Muslims, decreasing slightly in the 1931 census to 185, in 35 households.

In the 1944/5 statistics, the population was 290, all Muslim, with a total of 8,915 dunams of land, according to an official land and population survey. Of this, 608 dunams were used for plantations and irrigable land, 6,976 dunams for cereals, while 10 dunams were built-up (urban) land.

=== Jordanian era ===
In 1948 Palestinian refugees from Mount Gilboa were absorbed in the village and stayed there as sharecroppers. The refugees who arrived to Beit Qad had the opportunity to resettle in the village instead of moving to refugee camps. In 1951 they built, with the aid of the Jordanian government, another agriculture-based village, 2 km north of Beit Qad, called Mashru' Beit Qad which means "Project of Beit Qad"

The Jordanian census conducted in 1961 recorded 247 persons in Beit Qad and 197 persons in Mashru' Beit Qad.

=== 1967, aftermath ===
Since the Six-Day War in 1967, Beit Qad has been under Israeli occupation.

In a census conducted by Israel after it occupied it, Beit Qad "south" (respectively "north") were reported to have 223 (respectively 216) residents, including 86 (respectively 53) persons in households whose head was a refugee from Israeli territory.

During the early months of the First Intifada on 27 March 1989 Anjad Hashem Nasser, 4 years old, was shot dead. Press reports said the shooter was an Israeli policeman and that the Israeli army had launched an investigation. Five months later Minister of Defence Yitzhak Rabin sent a letter to MK Yair Tsaban acknowledging that a force of the Israeli Police was in the area and "therefore" the incident was investigated by the police.

== Geography ==
The village is located north of Deir Abu Da'if in the Jezreel Valley (known in Arabic as "Marj Ibn Āmir"). The village is split into two sections: the south and north (which is called Mashru Beit Qad) and is surrounded by fields. The village has an ancient mosque built from ancient building stones and an old Arabic maqam.

== Demography ==
Some of the village's residents are Bedouins, others came from the Sharon area.

== Bibliography ==
- Barron, J.B., ed. (1923). Palestine: Report and General Abstracts of the Census of 1922. Government of Palestine.
- Conder, C.R.; Kitchener, H.H. (1882). The Survey of Western Palestine: Memoirs of the Topography, Orography, Hydrography, and Archaeology. Vol. 2. London: Committee of the Palestine Exploration Fund.
- Dauphin, C. (1998). La Palestine byzantine, Peuplement et Populations. BAR International Series 726 (in French). Vol. III : Catalogue. Oxford: Archeopress. ISBN 0-86054-905-4.
- Government of Jordan, Department of Statistics (1964). First Census of Population and Housing. Volume I: Final Tables; General Characteristics of the Population (PDF).
- Government of Palestine, Department of Statistics (1945). Village Statistics, April, 1945.
- Guérin, V. (1874). Description Géographique Historique et Archéologique de la Palestine (in French). Vol. 2: Samarie, pt. 1. Paris: L'Imprimerie Nationale.
- Hadawi, S. (1970). Village Statistics of 1945: A Classification of Land and Area ownership in Palestine. Palestine Liberation Organization Research Centre.
- Hütteroth, W.-D.; Abdulfattah, K. (1977). Historical Geography of Palestine, Transjordan and Southern Syria in the Late 16th Century. Erlanger Geographische Arbeiten, Sonderband 5. Erlangen, Germany: Vorstand der Fränkischen Geographischen Gesellschaft. ISBN 3-920405-41-2.
- Mills, E., ed. (1932). Census of Palestine 1931. Population of Villages, Towns and Administrative Areas. Jerusalem: Government of Palestine.
- Palmer, E.H. (1881). The Survey of Western Palestine: Arabic and English Name Lists Collected During the Survey by Lieutenants Conder and Kitchener, R. E. Transliterated and Explained by E.H. Palmer. Committee of the Palestine Exploration Fund.
- Robinson, E.; Smith, E. (1841). Biblical Researches in Palestine, Mount Sinai and Arabia Petraea: A Journal of Travels in the year 1838. Vol. 3. Boston: Crocker & Brewster.
