= Deir Abu Da'if =

- Municipality type C

Arabic transcription(s)
  - Arabic: دير ابو ضعيف
- Location of Deir Abu Da'if within Palestine
- Coordinates: 32°27′21″N 35°21′57″E
- Palestine grid: 184/206
- State: State of Palestine
- Governorate: Jenin

Government
  - Type: Municipality

Population (2017)
  - Total: 7,045
- Name meaning: The convent of Abu Daif, p. n.=father of the weak, or lean one

Deir Abu Da'if (Arabic: دير ابو ضعيف) is a Palestinian village in the West Bank, located 6 km east of the city of Jenin in the northern West Bank. According to the Palestinian Central Bureau of Statistics, the town had a population of 5,293 inhabitants in mid-year 2006 and 7,045 in 2017.

== History ==
The village, not mentioned in 16th century tax records, was likely established in the modern era, with its settlers coming from Hebron.

Ceramics from the Byzantine era have been found here.

The nearby village of 'Abba, deserted after the 16th century, is now settled by people from Deir Abu Daif.

=== Ottoman era ===
In 1838, Edward Robinson noted Deir Abu Da'if as one of a range of villages round a height, the other villages being named as Beit Qad, Fuku'a, Deir Ghuzal and Araneh.

In 1870 Victor Guérin noted it as a small village, south of Beit Qad, but less important than it. Guérin called the village for Ed-Deir.

In 1870/1871 (1288 AH), an Ottoman census listed the village in the nahiya (sub-district) of Shafa al-Qibly.

In 1882 the PEF's Survey of Western Palestine described it: "A small village near the edge of the hills, on rising ground. The water supply is from cisterns. Olive- gardens exist on the north. The houses are of mud and stone."

=== British Mandate era ===
In the 1922 census of Palestine, conducted by the British Mandate authorities, the village had a population of 441; 434 Muslims and 7 Christians, where the Christians were all Orthodox, increasing in the 1931 census to 598; 593 Muslims and 5 Christians, with 136 houses.

In 1944/5 statistics the population was 850, all Muslims, with a total of 12,906 dunams of land, according to an official land and population survey. Of this, 1,919 dunams were used for plantations and irrigable land, 4,836 dunams were for cereals, while 30 dunams were built-up (urban) land.

=== Jordanian era ===
After the 1948 Arab-Israeli War, Deir Abu Da'if came under Jordanian rule.

The Jordanian census of 1961 found 1,191 inhabitants.

=== Post-1967 ===
Deir Abu Da'if has been under Israeli occupation since the 1967 Six-Day War.

== Bibliography ==
- Barron, J.B., ed. (1923). Palestine: Report and General Abstracts of the Census of 1922. Government of Palestine.
- Conder, C.R.; Kitchener, H.H. (1882). The Survey of Western Palestine: Memoirs of the Topography, Orography, Hydrography, and Archaeology. Vol. 2. London: Committee of the Palestine Exploration Fund.
- Dauphin, C. (1998). La Palestine byzantine, Peuplement et Populations. BAR International Series 726 (in French). Vol. III : Catalogue. Oxford: Archeopress. ISBN 0-860549-05-4.
- Government of Jordan, Department of Statistics (1964). First Census of Population and Housing. Volume I: Final Tables; General Characteristics of the Population (PDF).
- Government of Palestine, Department of Statistics (1945). Village Statistics, April, 1945.
- Guérin, V. (1874). Description Géographique Historique et Archéologique de la Palestine (in French). Vol. 2: Samarie, pt. 1. Paris: L'Imprimerie Nationale.
- Hadawi, S. (1970). Village Statistics of 1945: A Classification of Land and Area ownership in Palestine. Palestine Liberation Organization Research Center.
- Mills, E., ed. (1932). Census of Palestine 1931. Population of Villages, Towns and Administrative Areas. Jerusalem: Government of Palestine.
- Palmer, E.H. (1881). The Survey of Western Palestine: Arabic and English Name Lists Collected During the Survey by Lieutenants Conder and Kitchener, R. E. Transliterated and Explained by E.H. Palmer. Committee of the Palestine Exploration Fund.
- Robinson, E.; Smith, E. (1841). Biblical Researches in Palestine, Mount Sinai and Arabia Petraea: A Journal of Travels in the year 1838. Vol. 3. Boston: Crocker & Brewster.
