= Nasser Abufarha =

Palestinian-American anthropologist and businessman

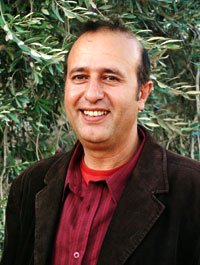
Nasser Abufarha

Nasser Abufarha is a Palestinian-American anthropologist and social entrepreneur. He is the founder of Canaan Fair Trade and the Palestine Fair Trade Association—a network of small-scale family farms organized under fair trade and organic production, active in 54 villages across the West Bank with 1500 members.

His book, The Making of a Human Bomb: An Ethnography of Palestinian Resistance, was published by Duke University Press in 2009.

== Early life and education ==
He was born in 1964 in Al-Jalama, a small farming village near Jenin, at the northern tip of the West Bank. He currently lives in his village in Palestine.

After first studying in Canada, he traveled to the United States, where he earned his bachelor's degree in Computer Science from Wayne State University in 1989. Abufarha went on to earn a PhD in Cultural Anthropology, Urban and Regional Planning from the University of Wisconsin–Madison in 2006.

== Career ==
In 2004, Abufarha established the Palestine Fair Trade Association—a network of small-scale family farms organized under fair trade and organic production, active in 54 villages across the West Bank with 1500 members.

He also established Canaan Fair Trade, a healthy lifestyle brand of Palestinian speciality foods selling to the United States and Europe. Canaan Palestine products are certified fair trade and organic offering Palestinian olive oil.

== Publications ==
- The Making of a Human Bomb: An Ethnography of Palestinian Resistance. Duke University Press, 2009.
- Book Chapter: Alternative Palestinian Agenda. in Palestinian-Israeli Impasse: Exploring Alternative Solutions to the Palestinian-Israeli Conflict. Mahdi Abdelhadi, Editor. Palestinian Academic Society for the Study of International Affairs (PASSIA), Jerusalem 2005.
- Alternative Trade Organizations and the Fair Trade Movement. Social Research: For A Better World. Issue 6, Spring (2013).
- Suicide, Violence, and Cultural Conceptions of Martyrdom in Palestine. Social Research: An International Quarterly of social Research. Neil Whitehead and Nasser Abufarha (2008).
- Land of Symbols: Cactus, poppies, Orange, and Olive Trees in Palestine. (6-2008) Identities: Global Studies in Culture and Power. Vol. 15.
- Bi-nationalism in Palestine-Israel: A Palestinian Historical Choice, Not a Last Resort. Shu’on Tnmawayeh (Journal of Development Affairs), June 2005, Al Multaqa (Arab Thought Forum) – Jerusalem.
- Bird's Labor Mirrors Palestinian Struggle, July 2001. Capital Times, Madison. Newspaper article.

== Awards ==
- One World Award, IFOAM Organics, Germany, October 2017.
- Palestine Exporter of the Year Award, Paltrade & Ministry of Economy, Palestine 2016.
- Premio Verde Award, The Navarro Foundation, Madrid, Spain, November 2015.
- Leadership Award, Citizenship Category. The Speciality Food Association, USA. Jan 2013.
- Inspiration of Hope Award. Interfaith Peace Builders. Chicago, USA. December 2010.
