= Palestine Fair Trade Association =

Palestinian fair trade producers' union

- Type: Non-profit organization
- Industry: Fair trade
- Founded: 2004
- Headquarters: Jenin, State of Palestine
- Website: www.palestinefairtrade.org

The Palestine Fair Trade Association (PFTA) is a Palestinian national union of fair trade producing cooperatives, processors, and exporters. It was founded in 2004 by Palestinian-American entrepreneur Nasser Abufarha.

PFTA established the first internationally recognized standard for fair trade olive oil in coordination with the Fairtrade Labeling Organization (FLO) in 2004, and introduced fair trade and organic farming concepts to thousands of Palestinian farmers in the West Bank. They empower their members economically and socially through fair trade and organic farming, capacity building, and certification, enabling small and marginalized producers to overcome some of the challenges of military occupation by giving them access to international markets.

== See also ==
- Canaan Fair Trade
