= Faqqua =

Faqqu'a
- Municipality type D (Village council)

Arabic transcription(s)
  - Arabic: فقوعة
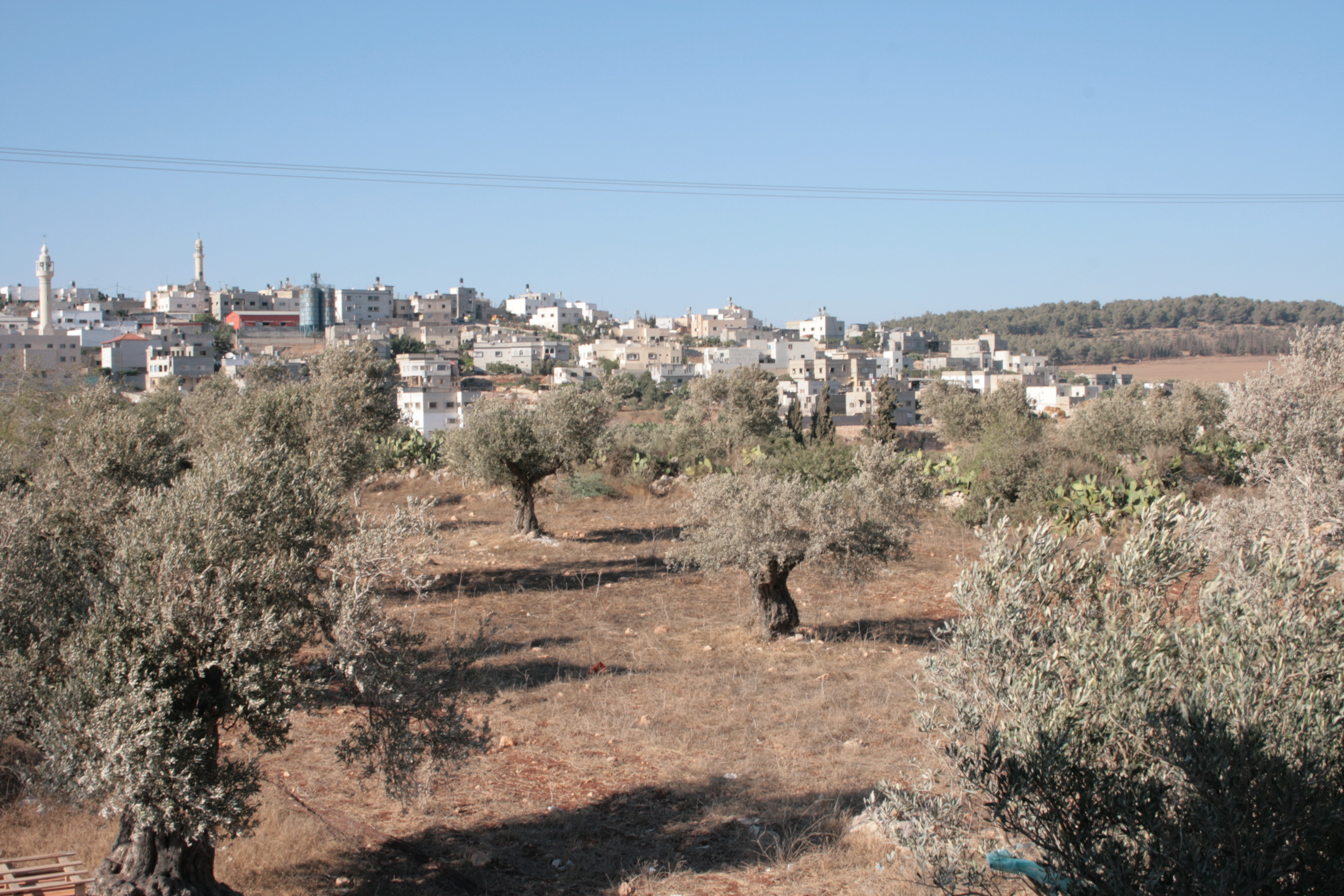
- Faqqu'a, from the south

- Location of Faqqu'a within Palestine
- Coordinates: 32°29′26″N 35°24′03″E
- Palestine grid: 187/210
- State: State of Palestine
- Governorate: Jenin

Government
  - Type: Village council

Area
  - Total: 7.7 km^{2} (3.0 sq mi)

Population (2017)
  - Total: 4,410
  - Density: 570/km^{2} (1,500/sq mi)
- Name meaning: "Toadstool"

Faqqu'a (Arabic: فقوعة) is a village on the northern West Bank, known for its cactus fruits, located along the Green Line on the Gilboa ridge. According to the Palestinian Central Bureau of Statistics, the town had a population of 3,490 inhabitants in mid-year 2006 and 4,410 in 2017, an exclusively Muslim population. The village belongs to the Jenin Governorate.

== History ==
Faqqu'a is not mentioned in 16th century records, but it is probably a relatively old village. Some of its residents have their origins in Jerusalem and others in Hebron.

The village's history is rather unknown, although there are numerous findings that reveal a Roman or Byzantine presence. Roman coins have been found in the area and there are several sites that are believed to be burial grounds as well as remains of ancient olive oil production. It's possible to find fragments of ancient pottery when simply wandering around the surrounding olive orchards. There is a common belief in local folklore that a Roman settlement once thrived nearby the current village.

=== Ottoman period ===
In 1838, Fuku'a was noted as one of a range of villages round a height, the other villages being named as Deir Abu Da'if, Beit Kad, Deir Ghuzal and Araneh. It was located in the Jenin district.

In 1870 Victor Guérin visited the village and noted that the village gave name to the mountain range. He further noted that the village had about 400 inhabitants, with houses of stone. There were several old cisterns cut into the rock, and some gardens bordered by cactus.

In 1870/1871 (1288 AH), an Ottoman census listed the village in the nahiya (sub-district) of Shafa al-Qibly.

In 1882, the PEF's Survey of Western Palestine described Fukua as "A large village on top of a spur. It gives its name to the Gilboa range, which is often called Jebel Fukua. It is surrounded by olive-gardens, and supplied by cisterns east and west of the village."

=== British Mandate period ===
In the 1922 census of Palestine, conducted by the British Mandate authorities, Faqu'a had a population of 553; all Muslims, increasing in the 1931 census to 663; still all Muslims, in a total of 153 houses.

In the 1945 statistics, Faqqu'a had a population of 880 Muslims, and the jurisdiction of the village was 30,179 dunams of land, according to an official land and population survey. Of this, 1,131 dunams were used for plantations and irrigable land, 8,440 dunams for cereals, while 22 dunams were built-up (urban) land.

=== Jordanian period ===
In the wake of the 1948 Arab–Israeli War, and after the 1949 Armistice Agreements, Faqqua came under Jordanian rule.

The Jordanian census of 1961 found 1,099 inhabitants in Faqqu'a.

=== Post-1967 ===
Since the Six-Day War in 1967, Faqqua has been under Israeli occupation.

== Geography ==
The village is located in the most northeastern part of the West Bank, 11 km east of the city of Jenin, adjacent to the Green Line. Faqqu'a lies just below the ridge of the Gilboa hills, which locals eponymously call Jebel Faqqu'a, overlooking the fertile Jezreel Valley (Marj Ibn Amer in Arabic), the city of Jenin and other Palestinian villages.

The higher part of the range, which is located on the Israeli side, is now an area where people come to hike or to enjoy the blooming of wild flowers during springtime. The scenic view from the top is spectacular; Mount Gilboa rises to a height of 508 m above the sea level, overlooking both the Jezreel Valley in the west and the Israeli town of Bet She'an and the Jordan River Valley in the east. Villagers owned 36,000 dunams (36 km^{2}) of land before the 1948 Arab-Israeli War in what is today Israel.

The village itself lies on a hill about 450 meters above sea level. The area around Faqqu'a is largely rocky, but there are terraces, which make it suitable for a number of trees, such as almond and olive trees which dominate the habitat. There are also patches of small plains scattered around the area that have been utilized to grow different produce such as wheat, lentils in the winter, and vegetables during the summer period.

== Social structure ==
The village's 3,490 inhabitants are exclusively Muslim, in contrast to some neighboring villages which have a mixed population of both Muslim and Christian families. The social structure in the village is somewhat different from a typical western community. A traditional Palestinian village is built up by a so-called family-clan structure of a hamula (clan), where social and gender relations are organized around a system of production and re-production. Even if the importance of the hamula has declined immensely, the clan-structure still exists. Every hamula can be sub-divided into extended families, in Arabic ayle. Within each ayle there are several nuclear families. The most important group today is, however, the ayle. There at least 15 extended families (ayle) in Faqqu'a today. The ten largest families are; Abu-Salameh, Al-Khateeb, A-Massad, Abu-Farha, Zeidat, Jaludi, Sharafi, Abu-Nassar, Abu-Assaf and Abu-Hussein..

== Economy ==
Agriculture had earlier been the prime source of income, but modernisation has seen most families survive by earning their livelihood from other sectors while farming land on afternoons and weekends. Some people are involved in construction, while other have businesses in Jenin, less than 11 kilometres from Faqqu'a. Academics, however, are more likely to find work in neighbouring cities such as Nablus or Ramallah where political and economical life is centred. Commuting between the regions has nevertheless become an endeavour due to the numerous Israel Defense Forces checkpoints.

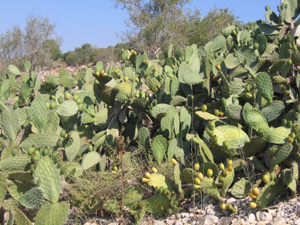
Cactus fruit

=== Water ===
The water conditions in Faqqu'a are similar to problems seen in other parts in the West Bank. The situation has become even worse since the start of the Al-Aqsa Intifada, since high water price and the economic hardship have aggravated the water shortage even further. Faqqua's only water source is the Abu 'Ahed well in the village of Deir Ghazaleh located about 5 kilometres away. Water is transported via tankers due to the lack of a water network.

=== West Bank barrier ===
The Israeli West Bank barrier in the area of Faqqu'a is a fence system that runs roughly along the Green line, which the village straddles. The construction of the barrier, which the village was informed of in 2003 and which was completed two years later, resulted in the expropriation of 245 dunum (0.245 km²) upon which grew 350 olive trees as well as clover and carob trees.

== Infrastructure ==
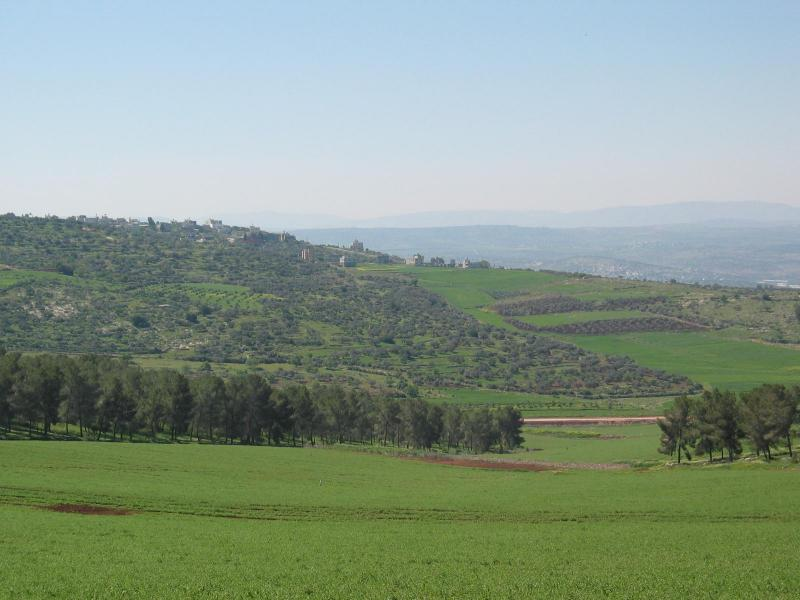
Northern view of Faqqu'a during the spring.

The village consists of several hundred private buildings, mostly two storey, that are centred on the top of a hill. A paved road, from the foot of the hill, twists up the hillside to an intersection where residents stand in line to get to the city by taxi. A public transportation network does not exist, so the residents are dependent on the taxi-vans that run between the village and Jenin. The ride takes about 10 minutes, but can last up to 50 minutes when checkpoints and roadblocks force detours, though this scenario has become less frequent as a result of the dismantling in 2005 of Ganim and Kadim in Israel's unilateral disengagement plan.

The intersection in Faqqu'a has developed into the village's commercial centre. There are four mosques in the village, and another one is being constructed. Telephone lines are rare in the village, but most people are today owners of one or two cellular phones (Israeli and Palestinian line). There are two schools, one for boys and one for girls. The girls' school reaches the level of senior high school.

== Israeli Settler violence ==
Israeli Settler-militant shoots an unarmed Palestinian civilian, Faqqu'a, West Bank

In 2026, with the expansion of Israeli settlements on Faqqu'a village lands, Israeli settler violence against Faqqu'a civilian population increased. On 12 September 2026, Israeli settlers entered privately cultivated village lands and attacked Palestinian farmers, while Israeli militia shot unarmed at Palestinian civilians, seriously injuring one of them (see video).

== Bibliography ==
- Barron, J.B., ed. (1923). Palestine: Report and General Abstracts of the Census of 1922. Government of Palestine.
- Conder, C.R.; Kitchener, H.H. (1882). The Survey of Western Palestine: Memoirs of the Topography, Orography, Hydrography, and Archaeology. Vol. 2. London: Committee of the Palestine Exploration Fund.
- Government of Jordan, Department of Statistics (1964). First Census of Population and Housing. Volume I: Final Tables; General Characteristics of the Population (PDF).
- Government of Palestine, Department of Statistics (1945). Village Statistics, April, 1945.
- Guérin, V. (1874). Description Géographique Historique et Archéologique de la Palestine (in French). Vol. 2: Samarie, pt. 1. Paris: L'Imprimerie Nationale.
- Hadawi, S. (1970). Village Statistics of 1945: A Classification of Land and Area ownership in Palestine. Palestine Liberation Organization Research Center.
- Mills, E., ed. (1932). Census of Palestine 1931. Population of Villages, Towns and Administrative Areas. Jerusalem: Government of Palestine.
- Palmer, E.H. (1881). The Survey of Western Palestine: Arabic and English Name Lists Collected During the Survey by Lieutenants Conder and Kitchener, R. E. Transliterated and Explained by E.H. Palmer. Committee of the Palestine Exploration Fund.
- Robinson, E.; Smith, E. (1841). Biblical Researches in Palestine, Mount Sinai and Arabia Petraea: A Journal of Travels in the year 1838. Vol. 3. Boston: Crocker & Brewster.
