= Canaan Fair Trade =

Palestinian fair trade business

- Company type: Business
- Industry: Fair trade
- Founded: 2004
- Founder: Nasser Abufarha
- Headquarters: Jenin, State of Palestine
- Products: Olive Oil; Za'atar; Maftoul; Freekeh; Almond Pesto; Wild Caper and green Olive Tapenade; Sweet Olives Tapenade; Wild Caper and Tomato Tapenade
- Website: www.canaanpalestine.com

Canaan Fair Trade is a supplier of organic and fair trade ingredients including olive oil, almonds, almond oil, carob syrup, freekeh and maftoul to Europe, North America and the Middle East. It was founded in 2004 by Palestinian-American Nasser Abufarha and is based in the West Bank city of Jenin.

Canaan's products—including organic fair trade olive oil, maftoul, freekeh, and za'atar—are produced by over 1,700 farmers in the West Bank organized in informal cooperatives and represented by the Palestine Fair Trade Association.

Canaan Fair Trade also supplies 90% of the organic olive oil used by the U.S. company Dr. Bronner's Magic Soaps.

In the UK Canaan FT produce is marketed by Zaytoun under their own brand label.

The organization has a scholarship program for the children of its farmers, awarding 4-year full-tuition scholarships to West Bank universities to four students each year.

In 2008, Canaan Fair Trade began construction of a factory and processing facility on 4 acres (16,000 m^{2}) of land the near the village of Burqin, west of Jenin. The facility is designed to become both the organization's headquarters, as well as a tourist attraction, and will offer guided tours as well as a boutique selling fair trade products. It is expected to be completed in December 2008.

== General references ==
- Nasser Abufarha: Scholar and social entrepreneur at IMEU.net
- Palestinian fair trade company opens state-of-the-art facility near Jenin, IMEU, Nov. 28, 2008
