= Muqeible =

Muqeible: מֻקֵיבִּלָה (Hebrew); مقيبلة (Arabic)
- Location within Jezreel Valley region of Israel Location within Israel
- Coordinates: 32°30′51″N 35°17′41″E
- Grid position: 177/213 PAL
- Country: Israel
- District: Northern
- Subdistrict: Jezreel
- Council: Gilboa
- Population (2024): 4,638

Muqeible or Muqeibila (Arabic: مقيبلة, Hebrew: מֻקֵיבִּלָה), meaning "The front place", is an Arab town in Israel's Northern District, situated in the Jezreel Valley between Jenin in the West Bank and the Ta'anakh area. It is a part of the Gilboa Regional Council. In 2024, its population was 4,638. The inhabitants are mostly Muslims.

== History ==
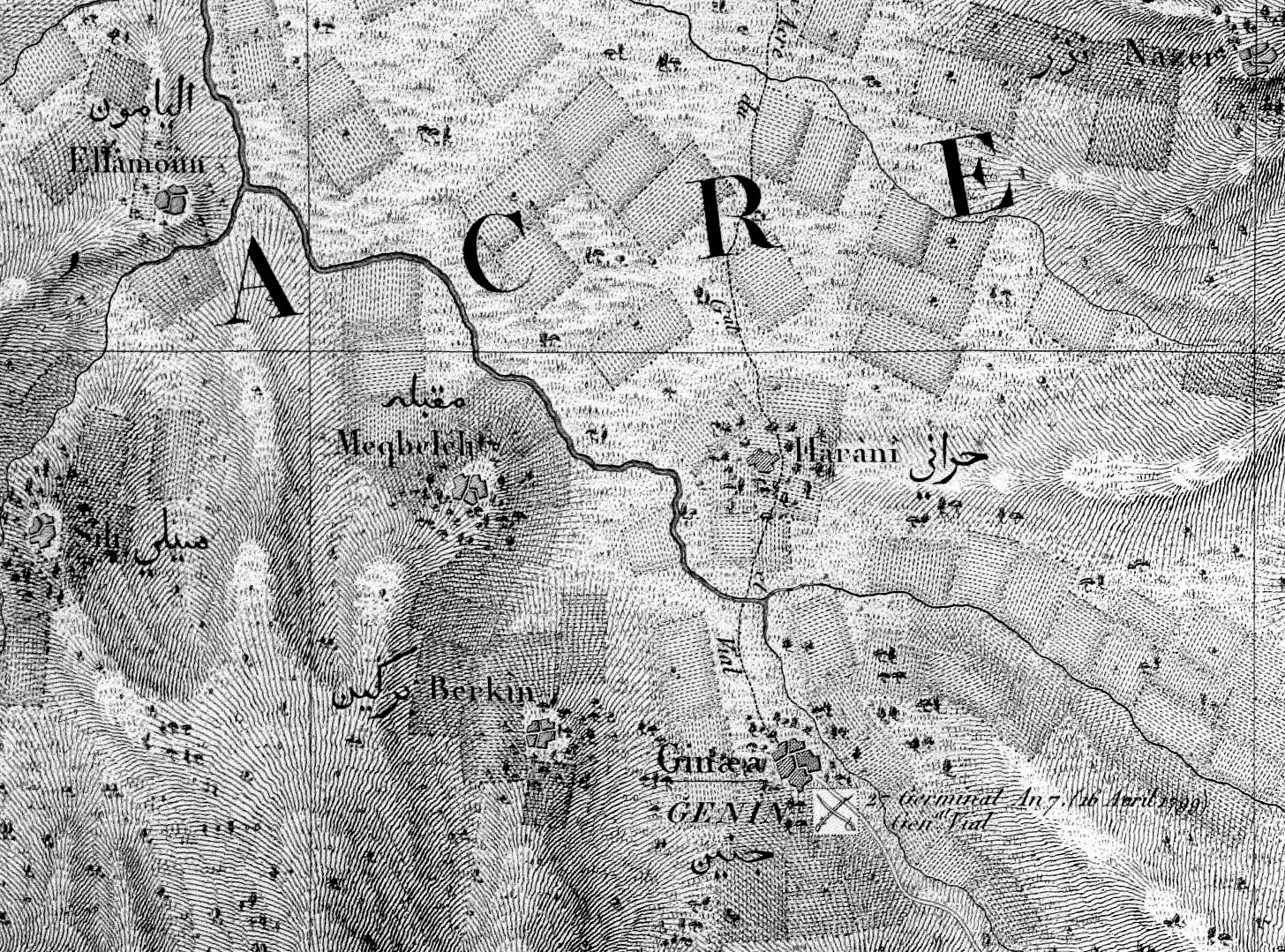
Muqeible, named Meqbeleh on the map by Pierre Jacotin from 1799

During the Roman-era, a town called "Muqeibleh" stood at the site. Byzantine-era settlement is attested to archaeologically by a well and pottery workshops from that period near the present village.

=== Ottoman Empire ===
In 1838 Edward Robinson noted Mukeibileh as a “village in the plain, on the direct route from Jenin to Nazareth.” He placed Mukeibileh as being in the District of Jenin, also called "Haritheh esh-Shemaliyeh".

Victor Guérin, who visited in 1870, noted that the village contained 400 inhabitants and had a number of cisterns. In 1870/1871 (1288 AH), an Ottoman census listed the village in the nahiya (sub-district) of Shafa al-Qibly.

In 1882, the PEF's Survey of Western Palestine described Muqeible as "a mud village in the plain, supplied by cisterns."

According to a local inhabitant, the villagers moved here from the al-Haram-Sidna Ali-area in the latter part of the Ottoman period.

=== British Mandate ===
In the 1922 census of Palestine conducted by the British Mandate authorities, Muquibleh had a population of 201; 181 Muslims and 20 Christians, where all the Christians were Orthodox. In the 1931 census, the population had increased to 270; 244 Muslims and 26 Christians, in a total of 67 houses.

By the 1945 statistics Muqeible had 460 inhabitants, all classified as Muslims. They owned a total of 2,687 dunams of land, while 4,441 dunams were public, a total of 7,128. Of this, 174 dunams were used for plantations or irrigable land, 6,421 for cereals, while 22 dunams were built-up land.

=== Israel ===
After the 1948 Arab–Israeli War, Muqeible became part of Israel.

In 1994, Andrew Petersen, an archaeologist specializing in Islamic architecture, examined the "Hawsh"; a large, square courtyard building, resembling a khan, in the center of the village. The central courtyard of the "Hawsh" measures approximately 30m per side. On the east side there is a small gateway, leading into a tall iwan. Petersen noted that the masonry suggested that it was built either in late Ottoman or early Mandate Period.

== Demographics ==
Historical population
Year	Pop.	±%
1972	800	—
1983	1,300	+62.5%
1995	2,000	+53.8%
2008	3,100	+55.0%
2022	4,389	+41.6%
2024	4,638	+5.7%

== Voting Patterns ==
In the 2026 election, 98 percent of voters in Muqeible voted for the Arab parties, while 2 percent voted for the parties of the center-left coalition led by Gadi Eisenkot and 0.3 percent voted for the parties of the right-wing coalition led by Benjamin Netanyahu. Among the voters for the Arab parties, 73 percent voted for the Joint List, while 27 percent voted for Ra'am. Voter turnout more than doubled compared with the 2022 election.

== See also ==
- Arab localities in Israel
- Muqeible Airfield

== Bibliography ==
- Barron, J.B., ed. (1923). Palestine: Report and General Abstracts of the Census of 1922. Government of Palestine.
- Conder, C.R.; Kitchener, H.H. (1882). The Survey of Western Palestine: Memoirs of the Topography, Orography, Hydrography, and Archaeology. Vol. 2. London: Committee of the Palestine Exploration Fund.
- Dauphin, C. (1998). La Palestine byzantine, Peuplement et Populations. BAR International Series 726 (in French). Vol. III : Catalogue. Oxford: Archeopress. ISBN 0-860549-05-4.
- Government of Palestine, Department of Statistics (1945). Village Statistics, April, 1945.
- Guérin, V. (1874). Description Géographique Historique et Archéologique de la Palestine (in French). Vol. 2: Samarie, pt. 1. Paris: L'Imprimerie Nationale.
- Hadawi, S. (1970). Village Statistics of 1945: A Classification of Land and Area ownership in Palestine. Palestine Liberation Organization Research Center.
- Mills, E., ed. (1932). Census of Palestine 1931. Population of Villages, Towns and Administrative Areas. Jerusalem: Government of Palestine.
- Palmer, E.H. (1881). The Survey of Western Palestine: Arabic and English Name Lists Collected During the Survey by Lieutenants Conder and Kitchener, R. E. Transliterated and Explained by E.H. Palmer. Committee of the Palestine Exploration Fund.
- Petersen, Andrew (2001). A Gazetteer of Buildings in Muslim Palestine (British Academy Monographs in Archaeology). Vol. 1. Oxford University Press. ISBN 978-0-19-727011-0.
- Robinson, E.; Smith, E. (1841). Biblical Researches in Palestine, Mount Sinai and Arabia Petraea: A Journal of Travels in the year 1838. Vol. 3. Boston: Crocker & Brewster.
