= Jalamah =

- Municipality type D (Village council)

Arabic transcription(s)
  - Arabic: جلمه
  - Latin: al-Jalama (official)
- Location of Jalamah within Palestine
- Coordinates: 32°30′31″N 35°18′48″E
- Palestine grid: 179/212
- State: State of Palestine
- Governorate: Jenin

Government
  - Type: Village council

Population (2017)
  - Total: 2,268
- Name meaning: the hill

Jalamah (Arabic: جلمه) or Jalameh is a Palestinian village in the West Bank, located 5 km north of the city of Jenin in the northern West Bank. According to the Palestinian Central Bureau of Statistics, the town had a population of 2,304 inhabitants in mid-year 2006 and 2,268 in 2017.

== History ==
It has been suggested that this was Jiliimna in the list of places conquered by Thutmose III.

Ceramics from the Byzantine era have been found here.

=== Ottoman era ===
Jalamah, like the rest of Palestine, was incorporated into the Ottoman Empire in 1517. During the 16th and 17th centuries, Jalama belonged to the Turabay Emirate (1517-1683), which encompassed also the Jezreel Valley, Haifa, Jenin, Beit She'an Valley, northern Jabal Nablus, Bilad al-Ruha/Ramot Menashe, and the northern part of the Sharon plain.

In the census of 1596, Jalama appeared as Jalama, located in the nahiya of Sara in the liwa of Lajjun. It had a population of 16 households, all Muslim. They paid a fixed tax rate of 25% on agricultural products, including wheat, barley, summer crops, goats and beehives, in addition to occasional revenues; a total of 8,000 akçe.

In 1838, it was noted as a village in the Jenin district.

In 1870, Victor Guérin noted the village on a hill, which sides had cisterns carved into rock and silos. He estimated the village to have 200 inhabitants, and also noted a kubbeh for a local saint.

In 1870/1871 (1288 AH), an Ottoman census listed the village in the nahiya (sub-district) of Shafa al-Qibly.

In 1882, the PEF's Survey of Western Palestine (SWP) described Jelameh as: "Resembles Jabbul. It stands in the plain, surrounded with arable land, and is supplied by cisterns. It has a kubbeh on the north side."

=== British Mandate era ===
In the 1922 census of Palestine, conducted by the British Mandate authorities, Jalameh had a population of 261; 253 Muslims and 8 Christians, where the Christians were all Orthodox. The population increased in the 1931 census to 304; 300 Muslims and 4 Christians, in a total of 68 houses.

In the 1944/5 statistics the population of Jalama was 460, all Muslims, with 5,827 dunams of land, according to an official land and population survey. Of this, 86 dunams were used for plantations and irrigable land, 4,777 for cereals, while 15 dunams were built-up (urban) land.

=== Jordanian era ===
In the wake of the 1948 Arab–Israeli War, and after the 1949 Armistice Agreements, Jalamah came under Jordanian rule.

The Jordanian census of 1961 found 784 inhabitants here.

=== Post-1967 ===
Since the Six-Day War in 1967, Jalamah has been under Israeli occupation.

On 14 September 2022, 2 Palestinians and 1 Israeli soldier were killed in a shootout at an Israeli military checkpoint on the border with the West Bank.

== See also ==
- Nasser Abufarha

== Bibliography ==
- Barron, J.B., ed. (1923). Palestine: Report and General Abstracts of the Census of 1922. Government of Palestine. (p. 29)
- Conder, C.R.; Kitchener, H.H. (1882). The Survey of Western Palestine: Memoirs of the Topography, Orography, Hydrography, and Archaeology. Vol. 2. London: Committee of the Palestine Exploration Fund.
- Conder, C.R. (1876). "Palestine before Joshua". Quarterly Statement - Palestine Exploration Fund. 8: 140–148.
- Dauphin, C. (1998). La Palestine byzantine, Peuplement et Populations. BAR International Series 726 (in French). Vol. III : Catalogue. Oxford: Archeopress. ISBN 0-860549-05-4.
- Government of Jordan, Department of Statistics (1964). First Census of Population and Housing. Volume I: Final Tables; General Characteristics of the Population (PDF).
- Government of Palestine, Department of Statistics (1945). Village Statistics, April, 1945.
- Guérin, V. (1874). Description Géographique Historique et Archéologique de la Palestine (in French). Vol. 2: Samarie, pt. 1. Paris: L'Imprimerie Nationale.
- Hadawi, S. (1970). Village Statistics of 1945: A Classification of Land and Area ownership in Palestine. Palestine Liberation Organization Research Center.
- Hütteroth, W.-D.; Abdulfattah, K. (1977). Historical Geography of Palestine, Transjordan and Southern Syria in the Late 16th Century. Erlanger Geographische Arbeiten, Sonderband 5. Erlangen, Germany: Vorstand der Fränkischen Geographischen Gesellschaft. ISBN 3-920405-41-2.
- Mills, E., ed. (1932). Census of Palestine 1931. Population of Villages, Towns and Administrative Areas. Jerusalem: Government of Palestine.
- Palmer, E.H. (1881). The Survey of Western Palestine: Arabic and English Name Lists Collected During the Survey by Lieutenants Conder and Kitchener, R. E. Transliterated and Explained by E.H. Palmer. Committee of the Palestine Exploration Fund.
- Robinson, E.; Smith, E. (1841). Biblical Researches in Palestine, Mount Sinai and Arabia Petraea: A Journal of Travels in the year 1838. Vol. 3. Boston: Crocker & Brewster.
