= Fatima Khatun Mosque =

Mosque in Jenin, West Bank, Palestine

- مسجد فاطمة خاتون
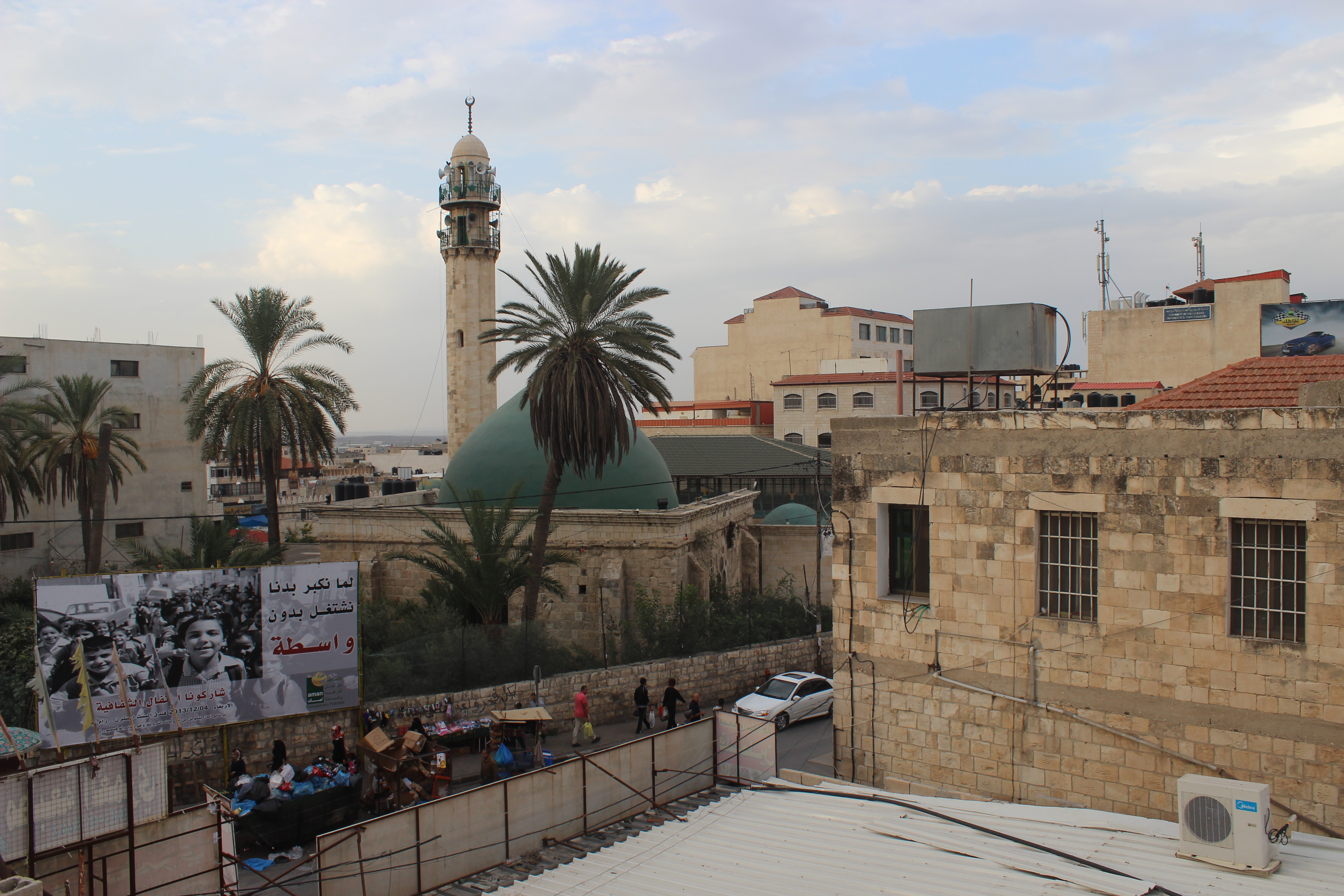
- The mosque in 2013

- Location of the mosque in the West Bank

Religion
- Affiliation: Sunni Islam
- Ecclesiastical or organisational status: Mosque
- Status: Active

Location
- Location: Jenin, West Bank
- Country: Palestine
- Interactive map of Fatima Khatun Mosque
- Coordinates: 32°27′44″N 35°18′05″E

Architecture
- Style: Ottoman
- Founder: Fatima Khatun
- Completed: 1566

Specifications
- Dome: 1
- Minaret: 1

The Fatima Khatun Mosque (Arabic: مسجد فاطمة خاتون), also known as the Great Mosque of Jenin (Arabic: جامع جنين الكبير), is the main mosque of the city of Jenin in northern West Bank, Palestine. Adjacent to the mosque is the still-active Fatima Khatun Girls' School.

== History ==
A ruined mosque dating back to 636 CE stood on the site of the modern-day mosque. It was renovated during the Mamluk era in the 14th-century, but again fell into ruin.

The existing structure was founded in 1566 by Fatima Khatun, the wife of Lala Kara Mustafa Pasha, the Bosnian governor of Damascus during the reign of Ottoman sultan Suleiman the Magnificent. Fatima Khatun paid regular visits to the area, but took a particular liking to Jenin while traveling towards Jerusalem for pilgrimage. In the center of Jenin, she decided to have the building established atop the remains of the old mosque. Numerous religious trusts (waqf) including a local public bath (hamaam) and many of the nearby shops were designated to fund the Fatima Khatun Mosque thereafter.

== See also ==
- List of mosques in Palestine
- Islam in Palestine
- Sanur Citadel
