= Strings of Freedom =

Palestinian youth orchestra

- Youth orchestra
- Founded: 2009
- Location: Jenin, West Bank, Palestine
- Principal conductor: Wafaa Younis

Strings of Freedom is a youth orchestra in the West Bank town of Jenin, in Palestine. It was founded by an Israeli Arab, Wafaa Younis, who travels regularly from her home in central Israel to teach music to children in Jenin.

== Holocaust survivor incident ==
In 2009, Younis arranged for some of the young musicians to travel to Holon, Israel, to play for a concert for a group of Holocaust survivors.

Following the concert in Holon, the house that Younis rented and used as a music studio was sealed and she was briefly barred from working in Jenin. The Popular Committee, "a grass-roots group representing the Palestine Liberation Organization," told journalists that said the young musicians had been exploited by the orchestra director, Wafaa Younis, for the purpose of "normalizing" ties with Israel. He told the New York Times that the children had been "deceived" and dragged unwittingly into a political situation that "served enemy interests" and aimed to "destroy the Palestinian national spirit in the camp."

After a short period of time, Younis was allowed by the Palestinian Authority to return to the camp and continue teaching children and conducting the orchestra. In her words, "This is my family, here in the Jenin Camp. I love them so much and they love me back."

== See also ==
- List of youth orchestras
