= Deir Ghazaleh =

- Local Development Committee

Arabic transcription(s)
  - Arabic: دير غزالة
  - Latin: Deir Ghazala (official); Dayr Ghazzalah (unofficial)
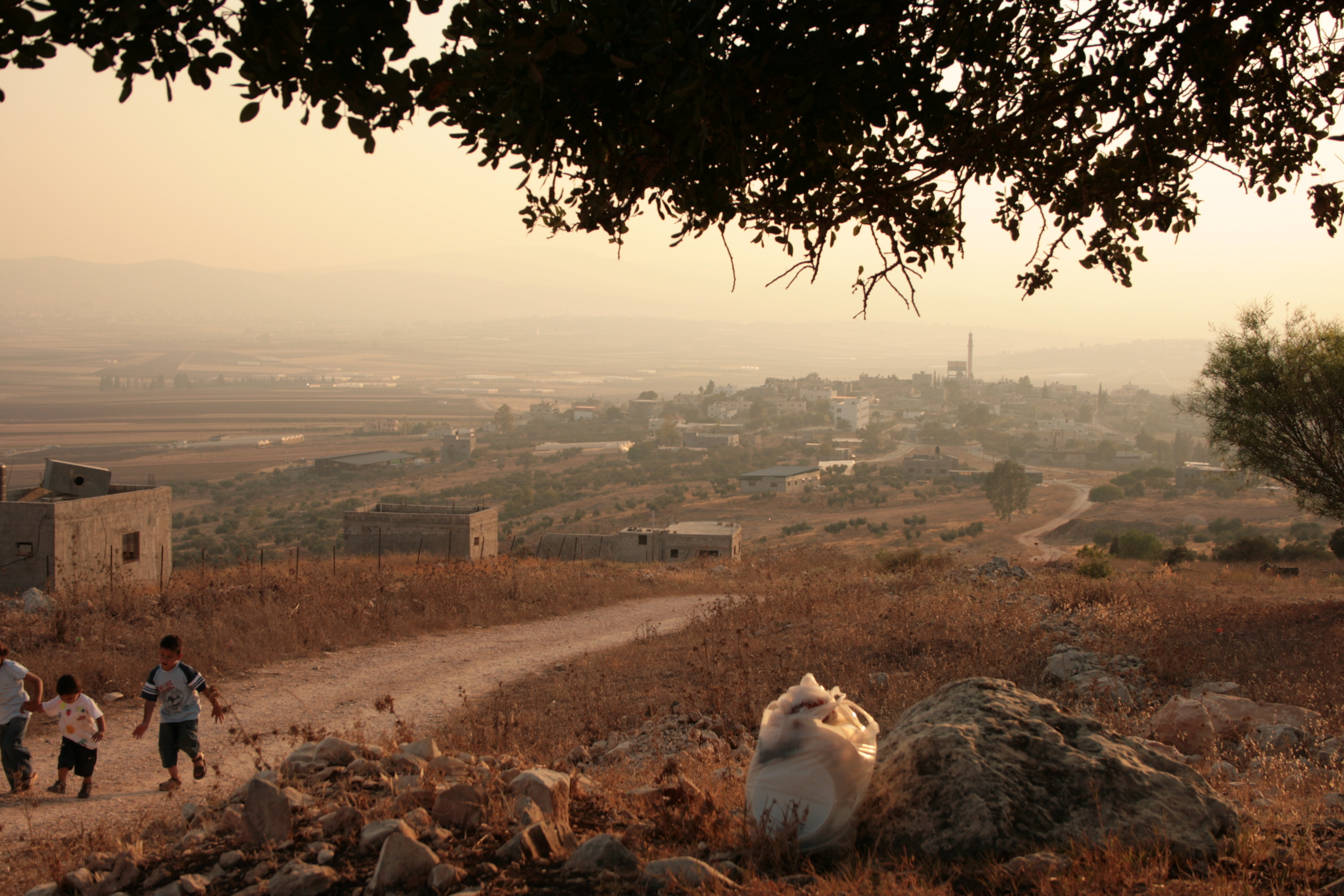
- The village

- Location of Deir Ghazaleh within Palestine
- Coordinates: 32°29′47″N 35°21′02″E
- Palestine grid: 183/211
- State: State of Palestine
- Governorate: Jenin

Government
  - Type: Local Development Committee

Area
  - Total: 6.6 km^{2} (2.5 sq mi)

Population (2017)
  - Total: 1,129
  - Density: 170/km^{2} (440/sq mi)
- Name meaning: "Monastery of the gazelle"

Deir Ghazaleh (Arabic: دير غزالة) is a Palestinian village in the northern West Bank, located nine kilometers northeast of Jenin in the Jenin Governorate. According to the Palestinian Central Bureau of Statistics, Deir Ghazaleh had a population of over 850 inhabitants in mid-year 2006 and 1,129 in 2017, mostly Muslims with a small Christian minority.

== History ==
Ceramics from the Byzantine era have been found here.

=== Ottoman era ===
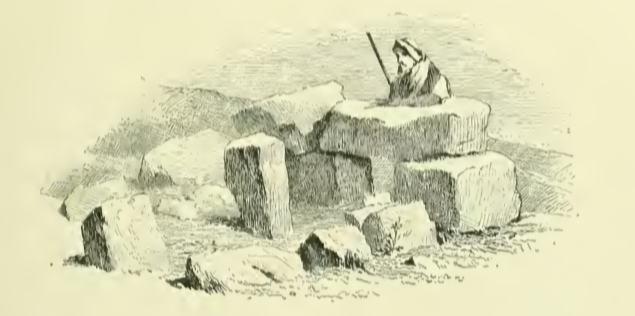
Deir Ghazaleh ruin, in 1882

In 1517, Deir Ghazaleh was incorporated into the Ottoman Empire with the rest of Palestine. During the 16th and 17th centuries, it belonged to the Turabay Emirate (1517-1683), which encompassed also the Jezreel Valley, Haifa, Jenin, Beit She'an Valley, northern Jabal Nablus, Bilad al-Ruha/Ramot Menashe, and the northern part of the Sharon plain. By the 1596 tax register it was part of nahiya (subdistrict) of Jinin under the liwa' (district) of Lajjun, with a population of 5 Muslim households. The villagers paid a fixed tax rate of 25% on agricultural products, including wheat, barley, summer crops, olive trees, beehives and/or goats, in addition to occasional revenues; a total of 3,000 akçe.

In 1838, Edward Robinson noted Deir Ghuzal as one of a range of villages round a height, the other villages being named as Beit Qad, Fuku'a, Deir Abu Da'if and Araneh, located in the District of Jenin, also called Haritheh esh-Shemaliyeh.

In 1870 Victor Guérin found it have about fifteen houses, bordered by several antiquated cisterns and silos.

In 1882 the PEF's Survey of Western Palestine found that it resembled Deir Abu Da'if, and that "the ground round it is partly rock, partly arable land."

They further noted a ruin, one mile to the south east of the village, "It is firmly bedded into the earth, which contains fragments of pottery, apparently ancient. The stone seems to have been packed with smaller ones round its base to keep it in position, as found by excavation. The stones are very heavy, and the construction of this monument must have been a considerable labour. It somewhat resembles the vinevard towers existing in other parts of Palestine; but fallen stones sufficient for such a structure were not observed, and there is no reason to suppose it to have ever consisted of more than two courses."

=== British Mandate era ===
In the 1922 census of Palestine, conducted by the British Mandate authorities, the village had a population of 134; 120 Muslims and 14 Christians, where the Christians were all Orthodox, increasing slightly in the 1931 census to 186; 169 Muslims and 17 Christians, with 34 houses.

In 1944/5 statistics the population was 270; 240 Muslims and 30 Christians, with a total of 6,588 dunams of land, according to an official land and population survey. Of this, 160 dunams were used for plantations and irrigable land, 4,917 dunams were for cereals, while 6 dunams were built-up (urban) land.

=== Jordanian era ===
After the 1948 Arab-Israeli War, Deir Ghazaleh came under Jordanian rule.

In 1961, the population of Deir Ghazzala was 493, of whom 29 were Christian.

=== Post-1967 ===
Deir Ghazaleh has been under Israeli occupation along with the rest of the West Bank since the 1967 Six-Day War, and according to the Israeli census of that year, the population of Deir Ghazzala stood at 494, of whom 163 were registered as having come from Israel.

== Water sources ==
The main source of water is the large groundwater aquifer underlying the West Bank. A well on the outskirts of the village, called the Abu ´Ahed well, supplies water to the village and surrounding communities.

== Education and culture ==
A library was established in Deir Ghazaleh under the auspices of the Program for the Social Empowerment of Rural Women. The Deir Ghazaleh Women’s club, established in 1997, offers training course and workshops for local women.

== Bibliography ==
- Barron, J.B., ed. (1923). Palestine: Report and General Abstracts of the Census of 1922. Government of Palestine.
- Conder, C.R.; Kitchener, H.H. (1882). The Survey of Western Palestine: Memoirs of the Topography, Orography, Hydrography, and Archaeology. Vol. 2. London: Committee of the Palestine Exploration Fund.
- Dauphin, C. (1998). La Palestine byzantine, Peuplement et Populations. BAR International Series 726 (in French). Vol. III : Catalogue. Oxford: Archeopress. ISBN 0-860549-05-4.
- Government of Jordan, Department of Statistics (1964). First Census of Population and Housing. Volume I: Final Tables; General Characteristics of the Population (PDF).
- Government of Palestine, Department of Statistics (1945). Village Statistics, April, 1945.
- Guérin, V. (1874). Description Géographique Historique et Archéologique de la Palestine (in French). Vol. 2: Samarie, pt. 1. Paris: L'Imprimerie Nationale.
- Hadawi, S. (1970). Village Statistics of 1945: A Classification of Land and Area ownership in Palestine. Palestine Liberation Organization Research Center.
- Hütteroth, W.-D.; Abdulfattah, K. (1977). Historical Geography of Palestine, Transjordan and Southern Syria in the Late 16th Century. Erlanger Geographische Arbeiten, Sonderband 5. Erlangen, Germany: Vorstand der Fränkischen Geographischen Gesellschaft. ISBN 3-920405-41-2.
- Mills, E., ed. (1932). Census of Palestine 1931. Population of Villages, Towns and Administrative Areas. Jerusalem: Government of Palestine.
- Palmer, E.H. (1881). The Survey of Western Palestine: Arabic and English Name Lists Collected During the Survey by Lieutenants Conder and Kitchener, R. E. Transliterated and Explained by E.H. Palmer. Committee of the Palestine Exploration Fund.
- Robinson, E.; Smith, E. (1841). Biblical Researches in Palestine, Mount Sinai and Arabia Petraea: A Journal of Travels in the year 1838. Vol. 3. Boston: Crocker & Brewster.
