= Muqeible Airfield =

Abandoned Israeli military airfield

Muqeible Airfield
- RAF Muqeible
- Muqeible in Palestine
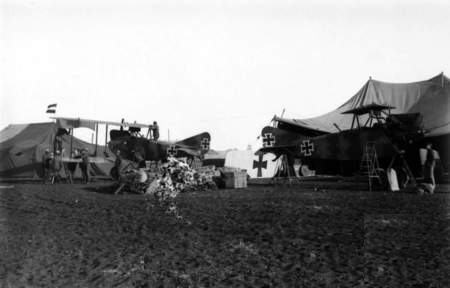
- Germans assembling AEG C.IV reconnaissance planes at Muqeible, c. 1917.

Site information
- Type: Military airfield
- Owner: Royal Air Force
- Operator: Royal Air Force; United States Army Air Force (WWII)
- Condition: Abandoned

Location
- Location in Mandatory Palestine
- Coordinates: 32°30′11″N 35°17′21″E

Site history
- Built: 1917
- Built for: Luftstreitkräfte (German Imperial Air Force)
- In use: 1917–1945
- Materials: Concrete runways
- Fate: Abandoned, partially repurposed for agriculture
- Battles/wars: Battle of Megiddo (1918); Western Desert Campaign (1941–1943)

Muqeible Airfield is an abandoned military airfield located in Palestine, in the northern West Bank. It is named after the Arab village Muqeible, which is now located within Israel.

== History ==
Muqeible Airfield was originally built in 1917 in the Ottoman District of Jerusalem (Ottoman Palestine) by the German Luftstreitkräfte; the Germans were allies of the Ottoman Empire. In 1918, after the Battle of Megiddo, the airport was used as a military airfield by the Royal Air Force, being designated RAF Muqeible. In July 1941, 12 Blenheims of the No. 45 Squadron RAF were sent there for use as a forward base for the assault on Beirut. It was also used by the United States Army Air Forces during the World War II North African Campaign. USAAF Ninth Air Force units were assigned to the airfield upon their initial arrival in the area, and once assembled were reassigned to combat airfields in Egypt to fly missions against the Axis forces in Western Egypt and Libya. Known USAAF units which used the airfield were:

- 57th Fighter Group, 20 July – 15 September 1942, Curtiss P-40 Warhawk
- 64th Fighter Squadron, 19 August – 16 September 1942
- 65th Fighter Squadron, 29 July – 5 August 1942; 29 August – 16 September 1942

After the war, the airfield appears to have been abandoned. Today, the airfield consists of two crumbling concrete runways, one aligned northeast–southwest about 02/20, the other east–west 09/27. The east–west still remaining full width and length, with a road laid down over the runway. Agricultural fields have been formed from the grassy areas of the airfield but no structures remain of the support base. Small concrete farm roads in the vicinity of the airfield runways are the remainders of taxiways.
