= Zaytoun (organisation) =

British non-profit organisation

- زيتون
- Formation: March 14, 2004; 22 years ago
- Type: Nonprofit
- VAT ID no.: 855911796
- Registration no.: 05078436
- Legal status: company
- Website: zaytoun.uk

Zaytoun is a British social enterprise which supports Palestinian farmers and producers by helping to increase the market for their products in the UK and Ireland, thereby supporting the resilience of their communities in the West Bank.

== History ==
A trading company named Zaytoun Limited was established in 2004, and converted to a community interest company in 2008.

Zaytoun is supported by UK charity Oxfam, amongst others. They were awarded Fair Trade certification for their olive oil in 2009 and for their almonds in 2012.. In 2025 Zaytoun won the Social Enterprise Award for 'Consumer Facing Social Enterprise of the Year'. Zaytoun is also listed as a Best Buy Label by Ethical Consumer magazine.

In 2024, the company had net assets of over £1 million, mostly in stocks of goods. In that year there were seven employees.

== Operations ==
Zaytoun imports and distributes extra virgin olive oil, Medjoul dates, almonds, za'atar, maftoul, and freekeh as well as soap and Dead Sea bath salts to retail and wholesale customers in the UK and Ireland including Oxfam, Co-op and Whole Foods Market, in addition to regional fair-trade and Palestine campaign groups. Jewish, Muslim and Christian faith groups have also taken an interest, ordering the oil for their places of worship and to sell at local stalls as part of a message of inter-faith peace promotion.

All of Zaytoun's profits are reinvested in the company's mission to support the resilience of Palestinian communities through fair trade.
