= Jenin =

Palestinian city, northern West Bank

Coordinates: 32°27′40″N 35°18′00″E

Jenin جنين
- Municipality type A (City)

Arabic transcription(s)
  - Arabic: جنين
  - Latin: Jinin (official); Janin (unofficial)
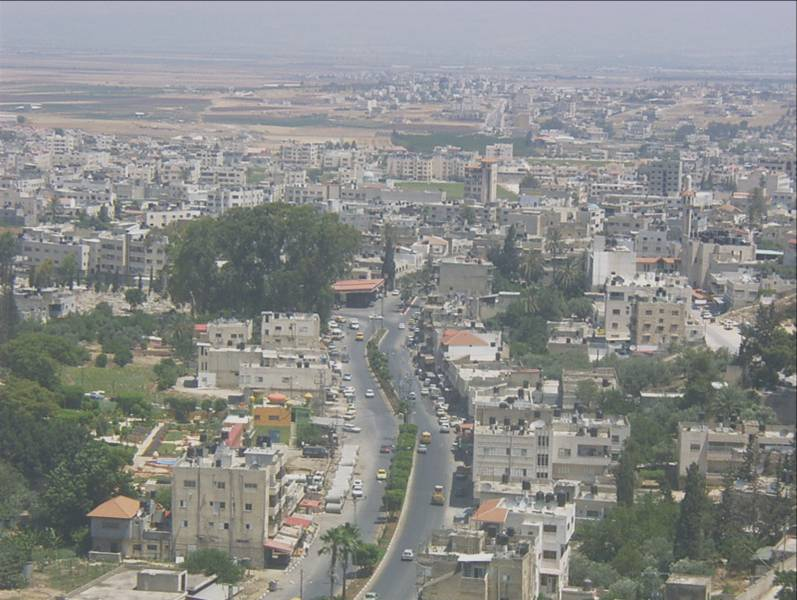
- Jenin skyline
- Interactive map of Jenin
- Location of Jenin within Palestine
- Palestine grid: 178/207
- State: State of Palestine
- Governorate: Jenin
- West Bank area (Oslo II Accord): Area A (Palestinian enclaves)

Government
  - Type: City

Area
  - Total: 37.3 km^{2} (14.4 sq mi)

Population (2017)
  - Total: 49,908
  - Density: 1,340/km^{2} (3,470/sq mi)
- (plus 10,371 in Jenin refugee camp)

Jenin (/ʒɪˈniːn/ zhin-EEN; Arabic: جنين, romanized: Jinīn, locally pronounced [ʒɪˈniːn]) is a city in the West Bank, Palestine, and is the capital of the Jenin Governorate. It is a hub for the surrounding towns. Jenin came under Israeli occupation in 1967, and was put under the administration of the Palestinian National Authority as Area A of the West Bank, a Palestinian enclave, in 1995.

The city had a population of approximately 50,000 people in 2017, whilst the Jenin refugee camp had a population of about 10,000, housing families of Palestinians who fled or were expelled from their homes during the 1948 Palestine War. The camp has since become a stronghold of Palestinian militants, being the location of several incidents relating to the Israeli–Palestinian conflict.

== Etymology ==
Jenin has been identified as the place "Gina" or "Ginah" mentioned in the Amarna letters from the 14th century BCE, as a town in Canaan. Jenin is commonly identified with the later biblical city of Ein-Ganim, from Hebrew: עֵין גַּנִּים, meaning "the spring of gardens" or "the spring of Ganim", probably referring to the many springs located nearby. The present-day Arabic name is believed to preserve the city's ancient name.

Jenin is identified with a number of important towns mentioned in ancient sources. Throughout history, it was referred to as "Ein Ganim", "Beth Hagan", "Ginah", and "Ginae", along other names.

== History ==
Tell Jenin is believed to constitute the original settlement core of the city. In the early 20th century, the tell was occupied by a modern cemetery and a threshing floor, and today it is located at the center of Jenin's business district.

The tell is also known as Tell el-Nawar, Nawar being an Arabic word for a number of nomadic peoples, especially the Dom people, Middle Eastern relatives of the Romani people (gypsies). This name reflects the pre-1948 presence of seasonal nomadic encampments at the site.

=== Neolithic and Chalcolithic ===
The earliest settlement at the tell (archaeological mound) dates to the late Neolithic and the early Chalcolithic.

- Stratum II (Neolithic-Chalcolithic).

=== Early Bronze Age ===
==== Early Bronze I ====
The unfortified settlement continued from the Late Chalcolithic into Early Bronze I.

- Stratum III (Late Chalcolithic-EB IA; Phases 1-3). Organic tempered pottery.
- Stratum IV (EB IB, c. 3300/3250-3000 BCE; Phases 1-4) apsidal house with curvilinear architecture.
- When abandoned people moved to more fortified sites Karem Jenin and Khirbet Bal'ame in EB II.

=== Late Bronze Age ===
==== Late Bronze II ====
Jenin has been identified as the place Gina or Ginah mentioned in the Amarna letters from the 14th century BCE. At the time, it was a vassal state of the New Kingdom of Egypt. The people of Gina managed to kill the warlord Labaya during the reign of Pharaoh Akhenaten.

=== Iron Age ===
Jenin is identical to Ein-Ganim, which the Hebrew Bible describes as a Levite city belonging to the Israelite tribe of Issachar. It has also been associated with Beth-Haggan, mentioned in 2 Kings in connection with Ahaziah's flight from Jehu, before he is wounded at Ibleam and later dies in Megiddo. The Book of Judith renders its name as Gini.

=== Roman and Byzantine periods ===
Josephus, a Roman-Jewish historian of the 1st-century CE, mentions Ginae as being in the great plain, on the northern border of Samaria. During the Roman period, Ginae was settled exclusively by Samaritans. The people of Galilee were disposed to pass through their city during the annual pilgrimages to Jerusalem. In 51 CE, a Galilean Jew was killed in Ginae by hostile Samaritans while en route to Jerusalem to celebrate Sukkot. With Roman procurator Cumanus failing to respond, Jewish Zealots led by Elazar the Son of Deinaeus (Ben Dinai) sought vengeance, and several Samaritan villages in Aqrabatene were destroyed.

Biblical commentator F. W. Farrar raised the possibility that this Samaritan village, "the first village at which [a traveler taking the road from Galilee to Judea over Mount Tabor] would arrive", was the one which rejected the disciples of Jesus in Luke's Gospel at the point where Jesus and his followers begin his journey towards Jerusalem.

Ceramics dating from the Byzantine period have been found here. There is no mention of Jenin in the reports of the Muslim conquest of the Levant from the Byzantines, which, according to the historian Moshe Sharon, "is not surprising, since it was a small place of minor importance".

=== Crusader, Ayyubid and Mamluk periods ===
Jenin came under Crusader rule in 1103. The Crusaders called it Le Grand Gerin (Latin: Garinum or Gallina Major), to distinguish it from the town of Zir'in, which they called Le Petit Gerin. Under the Crusaders it was a small seigniory, forming part of the Principality of Galilee or the Kingdom of Jerusalem.

Shortly before the Battle of Hattin in 1187, Jenin was captured by the Ayyubid sultan Saladin, who destroyed the nearby fort, Castellum Beleismum. In the 1220s, the geographer Yaqut al-Hamawi described Jenin as "a small and beautiful town, lying between Nabulus and Beisan, in the Jordan Province. There is much water, and many springs are found here, and often have I visited it." In 1229, a peace was concluded between Frederick II, Holy Roman Emperor and Sultan al-Kamil, during the Sixth Crusade, whereby the city was given to the Crusaders, but Sultan as-Salih Ayyub was able to control it permanently in 1244 after the Battle of La Forbie.

In 1255, it was agreed between the Ayyubid sultan in Syria, an-Nasir Yusuf, and the first Mamluk sultan in Egypt, Izz al-Din Aybak, to give the latter all of the lands lying west of the Jordan River, and thus Jenin entered into the possession of the Mamluks. It was one of eleven subdistricts of Mamlakat Safad (Province of Safed). In the late 13th century, Mamluk emirs (commanders) stationed at Jenin were ordered by Sultan Qalawun (r. 1279–1290) "to ride every day with their troops before the fortress of 'Akka, so as to protect the coast and the merchants." As one of the stations of the Mamluk barid (postal route) between the Mamluk capital Cairo and Damascus, it was one of the towns where fires were lit to warn of a Mongol attack. The geographer al-Dimashqi mentioned Jenin around 1300. From the time of Qalawun's son, Sultan an-Nasir Muhammad (r. 1299–1309, 1310–1341), it was a station on the route where ice was transported to Cairo for the sultans' drink houses. The Mamluk historian al-Qalqashandi (d. 1418) described Jenin as "an ancient spacious town which is riding on a shoulder of a nice valley in which there is a river of flowing water" north of Qaqun "on the top end of Marj Bani Amer [Jezreel Valley]". He also noted that it contained the mausoleum of Dihyah al-Kalbi, a companion of the Islamic prophet Muhammad.

=== Ottoman period ===
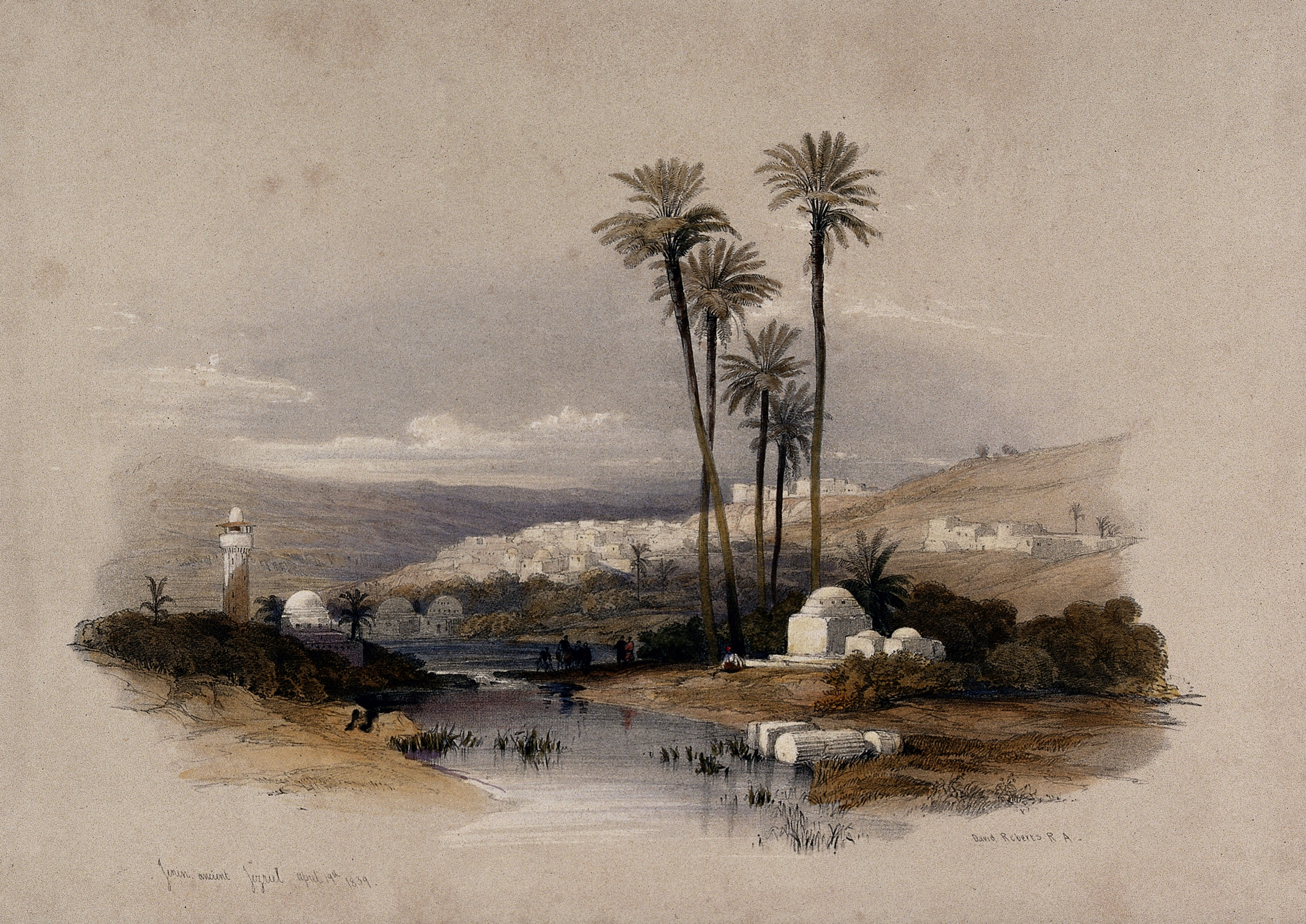
Painting of Jenin by David Roberts, 1839, in The Holy Land, Syria, Idumea, Arabia, Egypt, and Nubia

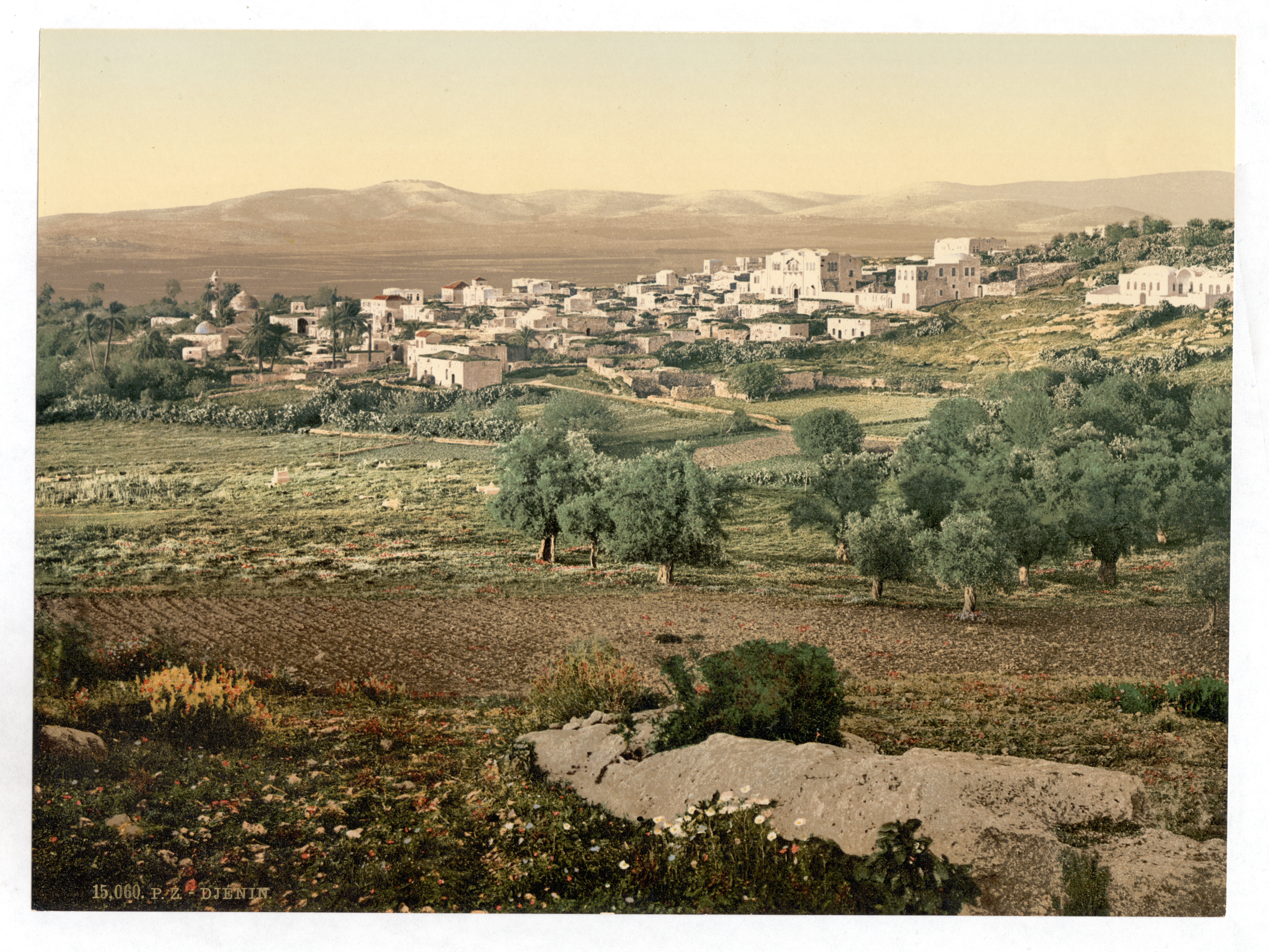
A general view of Jenin, between 1890 and 1900

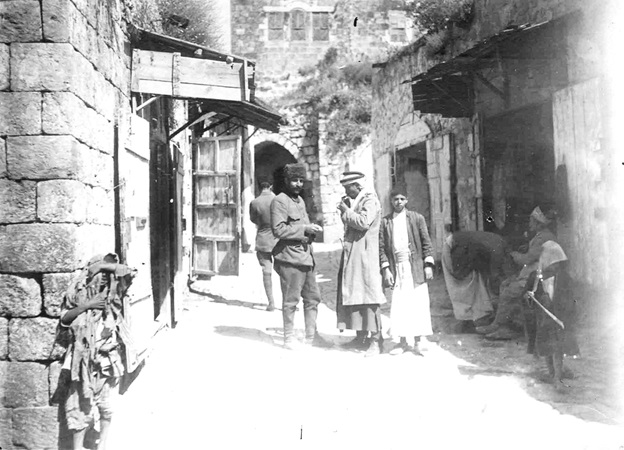
Street scene in Jenin, 1917. An Ottoman Army soldier (center left) with a local Arab (center right)

The Ottomans conquered Mamluk Syria in 1516. Jenin became the administrative center of a nahiya (subdistrict) of the Lajjun Sanjak (Lajjun District). The sanjak was officially called the Iqta (Fief) of Turabay until 1559 when it became officially known as the Lajjun Sanjak. The Turabay dynasty was the ruling house of the Bedouin Banu Haritha tribe, whose members held the governorship of Lajjun from the start of Ottoman rule through 1677.

The tax registers from 1548 to 1549 report that Jenin had a population of eight households, all Muslim. They paid a fixed tax rate of 25% on agricultural products, including wheat, barley, summer crops, goats and beehives, in addition to occasional revenues; a total of 2,000 akçe. All of the revenue went to a waqf (religious endowment) in the name of the Mamluk sultan Qansuh al-Ghuri (r. 1501–1516). Turabay rule was occasionally interrupted, including in 1564, when a certain Kemal Bey was appointed sanjak-bey (district governor) by the Ottomans. On 15 October 1564 Kemal Bey requested from the beylerbey (provincial governor) of Damascus that the stone caravanserai of Jenin be repaired, garrisoned and serve as the chief headquarters of the Lajjun sanjak-bey in order for Lajjun to prosper and for the road connecting Damascus to Jerusalem and Egypt to become secure. The official response was that the caravanserai be turned into a fortress; the fortress became ruined at some later point and 19th-century residents of Jenin used to claim that certain large rocks strewn in the village were the remnants of the 16th-century fortress.

The Turabays, who remained nomads in the plain between Mount Carmel and Caesarea, made Jenin the administrative headquarters of Lajjun and used the town's Izz al-Din Cemetery to bury their dead. A large, domed mausoleum was built for the grave of one of the chiefs and sanjak-beys of the family, Turabay ibn Ali (d. 1601). Known as Qubbat al-Amir Turabay (Dome of the Emir Turabay), it was described in a 1941 report as a ruined structure, and Sharon, writing in 2017, notes that it "does not exist anymore". No other graves of the Turabays in Jenin had survived into the 20th century. During the conflict between Fakhr al-Din of the Ma'n dynasty, who governed the sanjaks of Sidon-Beirut and Safed, and the Turabays, in 1623, Fakhr al-Din captured Jenin and stationed his men there. In 1624 the most prominent Turabay chief and sanjak-bey of Lajjun, Ahmad ibn Turabay, drove out the Ma'nid troops from Jenin and established his personal residence in the town.

In the mid-18th century, Jenin was designated the administrative capital of the combined districts of Lajjun and Ajlun. There are indications that the area comprising Jenin and Nablus remained functionally autonomous under Ottoman rule and that the empire struggled to collect taxes there. During the Napoleonic Campaign in Egypt which extended into Syria and Palestine in 1799, a local official from Jenin wrote a poem enumerating and calling upon local Arab leaders to resist Bonaparte, without mentioning the Sultan or the need to protect the Ottoman Empire.

In the late 19th century, some members of the Jarrar family, who formed part of the mallakin (elite land-owning families) in Jenin, cooperated with merchants in Haifa to set up an export enterprise there. During the Ottoman era, Jenin was plagued by local warfare between members of the same clan. The French explorer Guérin visited in 1870. In 1882, the PEF's Survey of Western Palestine described Jenin as "The capital of the district, the seat of a Caimacam, a town of about 3,000 inhabitants, with a small bazaar. The houses are well built of stone. There are two families of Roman Catholics; the remainder are Moslems. A spring rises east of the town and is conducted to a large masonry reservoir, near the west side, of good squared stonework, with a long stone trough. This reservoir was built by 'And el Hady, Mudir of Acre, in the first half of the century [..], north of the town is the little mosque of 'Ezz ed Din, with a good- sized dome and a minaret."

=== British Mandate ===
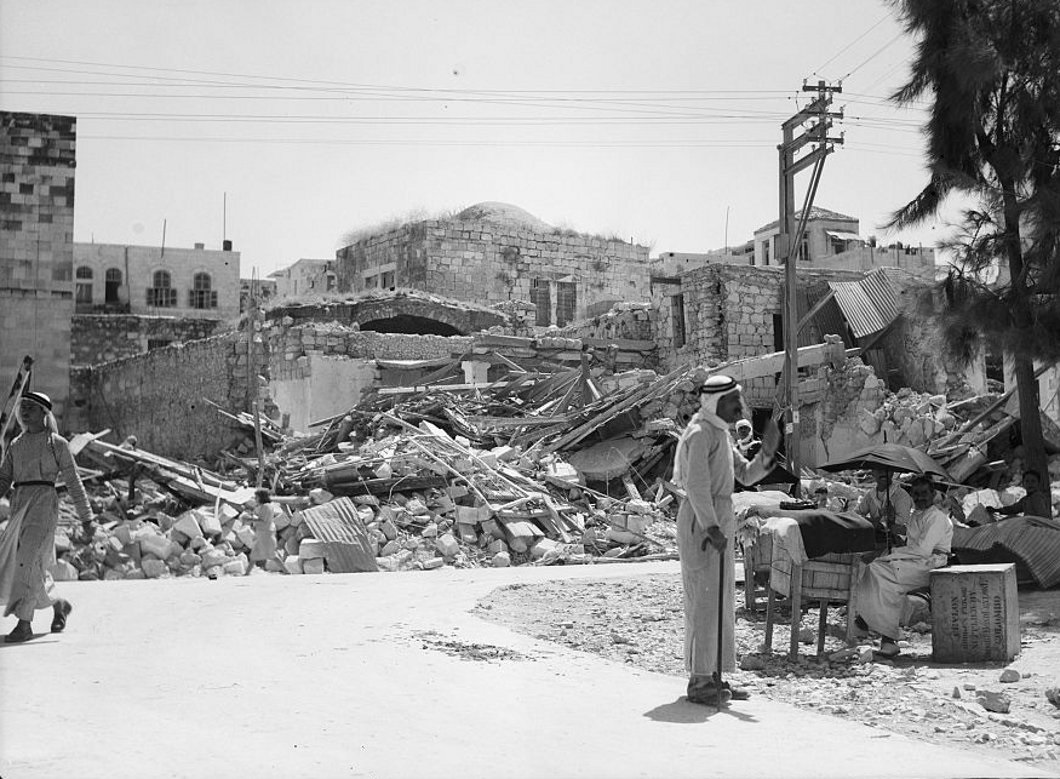
View of the rubble in Jenin after a quarter of the town was dynamited by British forces in 1938, as a retaliatory attack after a British official was assassinated

According to a census conducted in 1922 by the British Mandate authorities, Jenin had a population of 2,637 (2,307 Muslims, 212 Hindus, 108 Christians, seven Jews, and three Sikhs). A following census in 1931 showed a slight increase to 2,706 (2,610 Muslims, 103 Christians, two Jews, and one Druze) with another 68 in nearby suburbs (all Muslims). From 1936, Jenin became a center of rebellion against the British Mandatory authorities. By the summer of 1938, residents of the city embarked on "an intensified campaign of murder, intimidation and sabotage" that caused the British administration "grave concern", according to a British report to the League of Nations; the population had further increased to 3,100. The city played an important role in the 1936–39 Arab revolt in Palestine, prompted by the death of Izz ad-Din al-Qassam in a fire-fight with British colonial police at the nearby town of Ya'bad months prior to the start of the revolt. On 25 August 1938, the day after the British Assistant District Commissioner was assassinated in his Jenin office, a large British force with explosives entered the town. Despite having captured and killed the assassin, British forces ordered the inhabitants to leave, and blew up one quarter of the town as a form of punishment.

Jenin was used by Fawzi al-Qawuqji's Arab Liberation Army as a base.

The village statistics of 1945 list the population as 3,990 (3,840 Muslims and 150 Christians).

=== 1948 War ===
In the 1948 Arab–Israeli War, the city was defended by the Iraqi Army, then captured briefly by the forces from Israel's Carmeli Brigade during the "Ten Days' fighting" following the cancellation of the first cease-fire. Prior to the battle, the city's residents fled temporarily. The offensive was actually a feint designed to draw Arab forces away from the critical Battle for Jerusalem, and gains in that sector were quickly abandoned when Arab reinforcements arrived.

=== Jordanian occupation (1948-1967) ===
In the wake of the 1948 Arab–Israeli War, and after the 1949 Armistice Agreements, Jenin came under Jordanian rule. It was annexed by Jordan in 1950.

The Jenin refugee camp was founded in 1953 by Jordan to house displaced Palestinians who fled or were expelled during the 1948 War. In 2014 the camp had a population of 16,000. For 19 years, the city was under Jordanian control. A war cemetery for Iraqi soldiers and local combatants is located on the outskirts of Jenin.

The Jordanian census of 1961 found 14,402 inhabitants in Jenin.

=== Israeli occupation (1967- ) ===
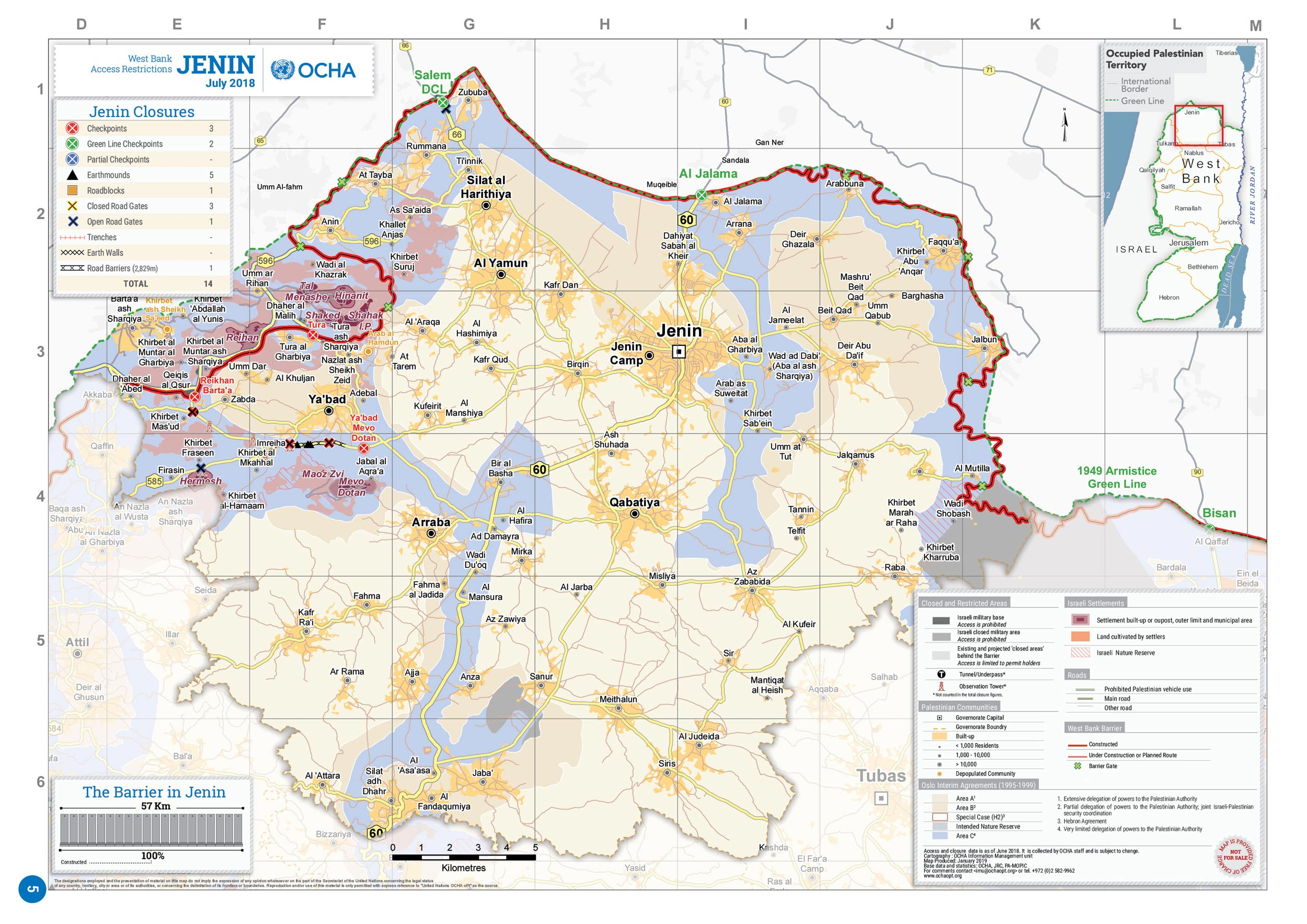
2018 United Nations map of the area, showing the Israeli occupation arrangements.

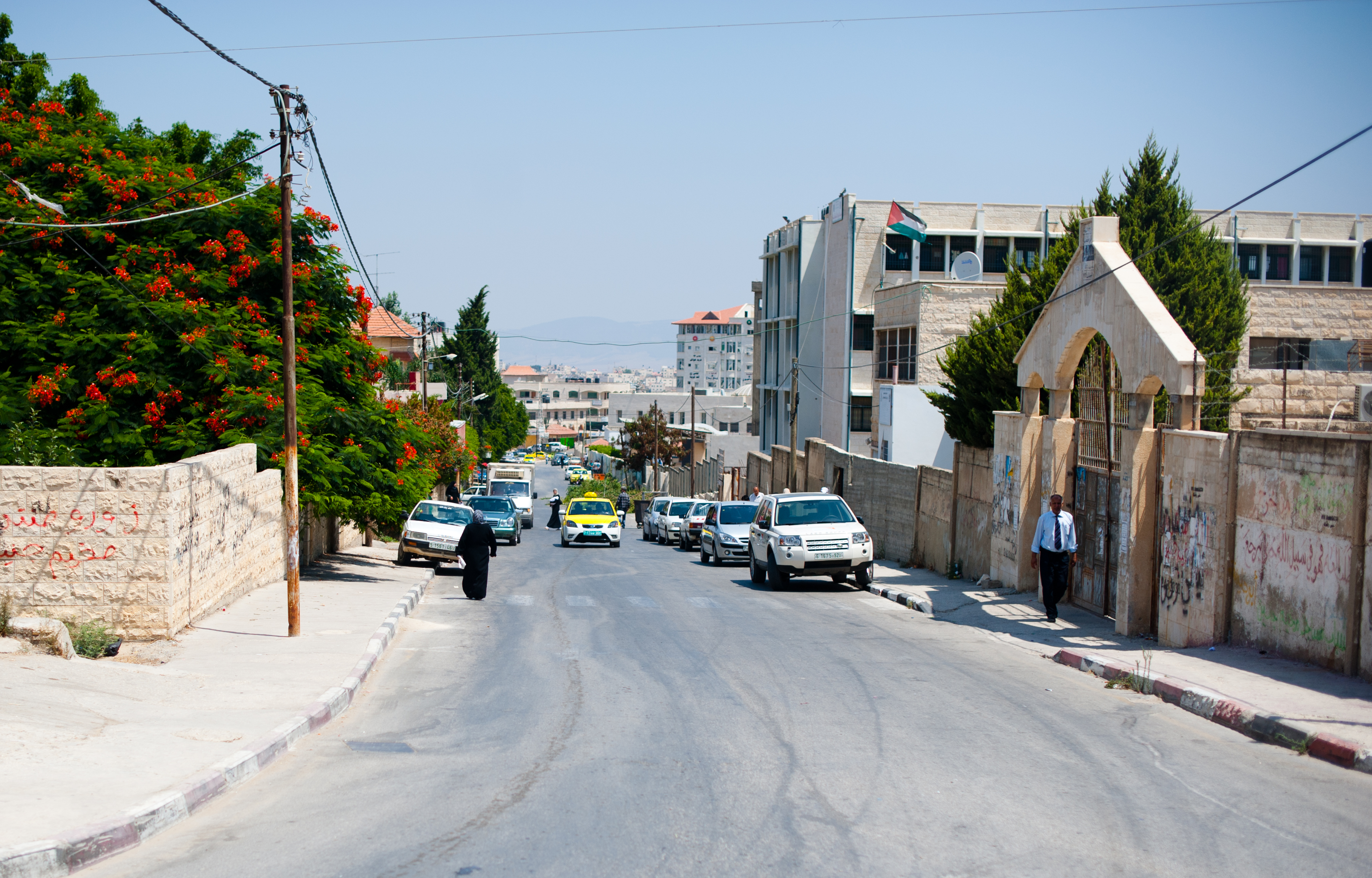
A street in Jenin, 2011

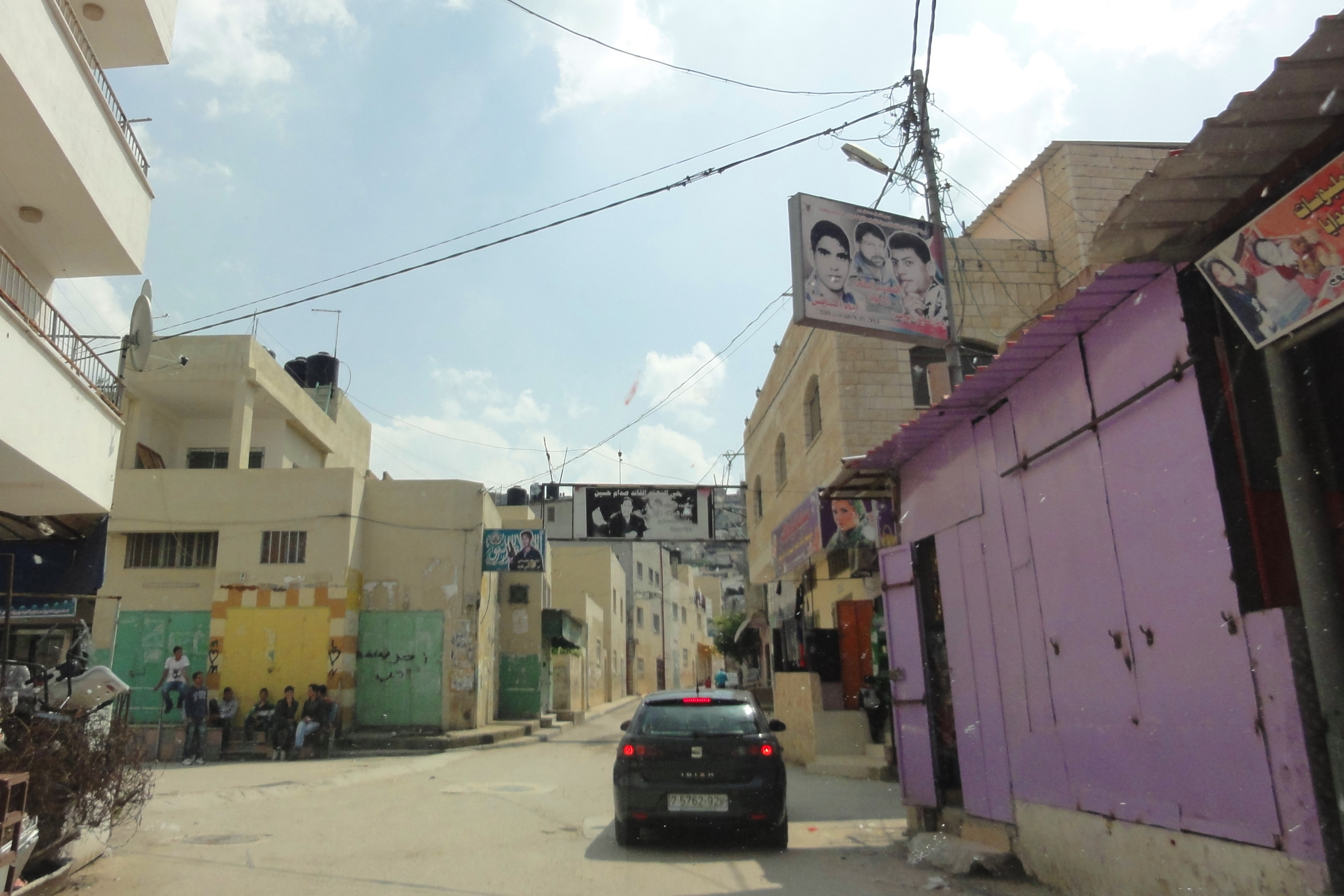
In Jenin

Jenin has been under Israeli occupation since the Six-Day War, in 1967.

==== First Intifada ====
On 14 May 1989, during the early months of the First Intifada. Mohammad Jibrin, aged 45, died in Ramallah Hospital after being beaten by Israeli soldiers in Jenin. Three months later, in response to a question from a member of the Knesset, Defence Minister Yitzhak Rabin wrote that there was no investigation by the Military Police Investigator.

==== Oslo Accords and Second Intifada ====
According to Joel Beinin, Jenin was classified as under the administration of the Palestinian National Authority as Area A of the West Bank, a Palestinian enclave, in 1995. In 1996, Israel handed over control of the city to the Palestinian National Authority in keeping with the Oslo Accords.

According to the BBC, the city is "Known among Palestinians" as "the Martyrs' capital", but the reason they gave was Israeli statistics about suicide bombings, the BBC did not identify any non-Israeli source for the name. During the Second Palestinian uprising (also known as the Al-Aqsa Intifada) the camp's militants, some 200 armed men, included members of Al-Aqsa Martyrs Brigades, Tanzim, Palestinian Islamic Jihad (PIJ) and Hamas. By Israel's count, at least 28 suicide bombers were dispatched from the Jenin camp from 2000 to 2003 during the Second Intifada. Israeli army weekly Bamahane attributes at least 31 militant attacks, totaling 124 victims, to Jenin during the same period, more than any other city in the West Bank.

During the al-Aqsa Intifada, Israel launched Operation Defensive Shield with the stated aim of dismantling militant infrastructure so as to curb suicide bombings and other militant activities. The army encircled and entered six major Palestinian population centers in the West Bank, among them Jenin. During the Battle of Jenin (2002) in April 2002, 23 Israeli soldiers and 52 Palestinians, including civilians, were killed. Human Rights Watch reported that the refugee camp, which was the major battleground, suffered extensive damage. Witnesses stated unarmed people were shot and denied medical treatment, and as a result died. Human Rights Watch have regarded many killings to be unlawful such as the death of a 57-year-old wheelchair-using man who was shot and run over by a tank despite having attached a white flag on his wheelchair. A 37-year-old man who was paralysed was crushed under the rubble of his house, his family was not allowed to remove his body. A 14-year-old boy was killed as he travelled to purchase groceries during the temporary relief of the curfew that was imposed by the army. Medical staff were shot at (one nurse killed) while trying to reach the wounded even after clearly being in uniform displaying the red crescent symbol. There have also been reports of Israeli soldiers using Palestinians as human shields, one father described how a soldier rested his rifle on his 14-year-old son's shoulder as he shot. Israel denied the entry of rescue teams and journalists into Jenin even after they withdrew. Over the following years, Jenin was subject to extended curfews and targeted killings.

During a gun-battle with Islamic Jihad militants who Israel says were firing at troops from inside the UN compound, an Israeli military sniper shot and killed a UN Relief and Works Agency (UNRWA) employee, Iain Hook (54) on November 22, 2002. The sniper reportedly mistook a cellphone in Hook's hands for a gun or grenade.

==== 2010s ====
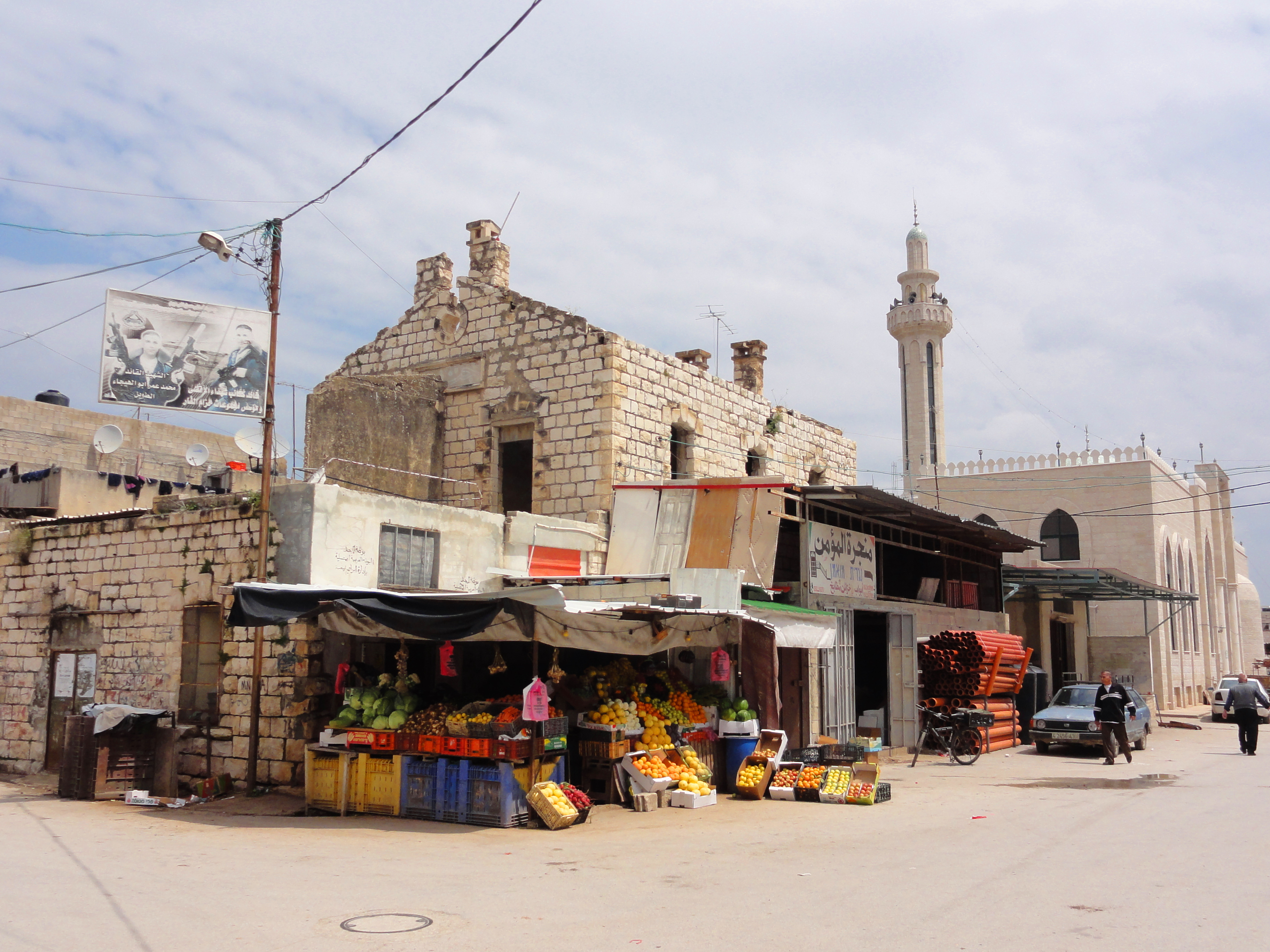
Downtown Jenin

In the framework of the Valley of Peace initiative, a joint Arab-Israeli project is under way to promote tourism in the Jenin region. In 2010, 600 new businesses opened in Jenin. The Canaan Fair Trade is headquartered in Jenin. Director of The Freedom Theatre in Jenin, Juliano Mer-Khamis, was killed by masked gunmen in the city in April 2011. Mer-Khamis co-founded the theatre with Zakaria Zubeidi, former military chief of the al-Aqsa Brigades who had renounced violence.

==== 2020s and Gaza War ====
On 6 February 2020, a Palestinian policeman, Tarek Badwan, was shot dead by an Israeli sniper as he stood at the entrance to the Jenin police station and chatted with a colleague. No explanation has been forthcoming. The incident was recorded on video.

On 17 June 2022, Israeli forces conducted a raid in the al-Marah area of the city. During the raid, Israeli forces opened fire on a car, killing three Palestinians and seriously injuring another.

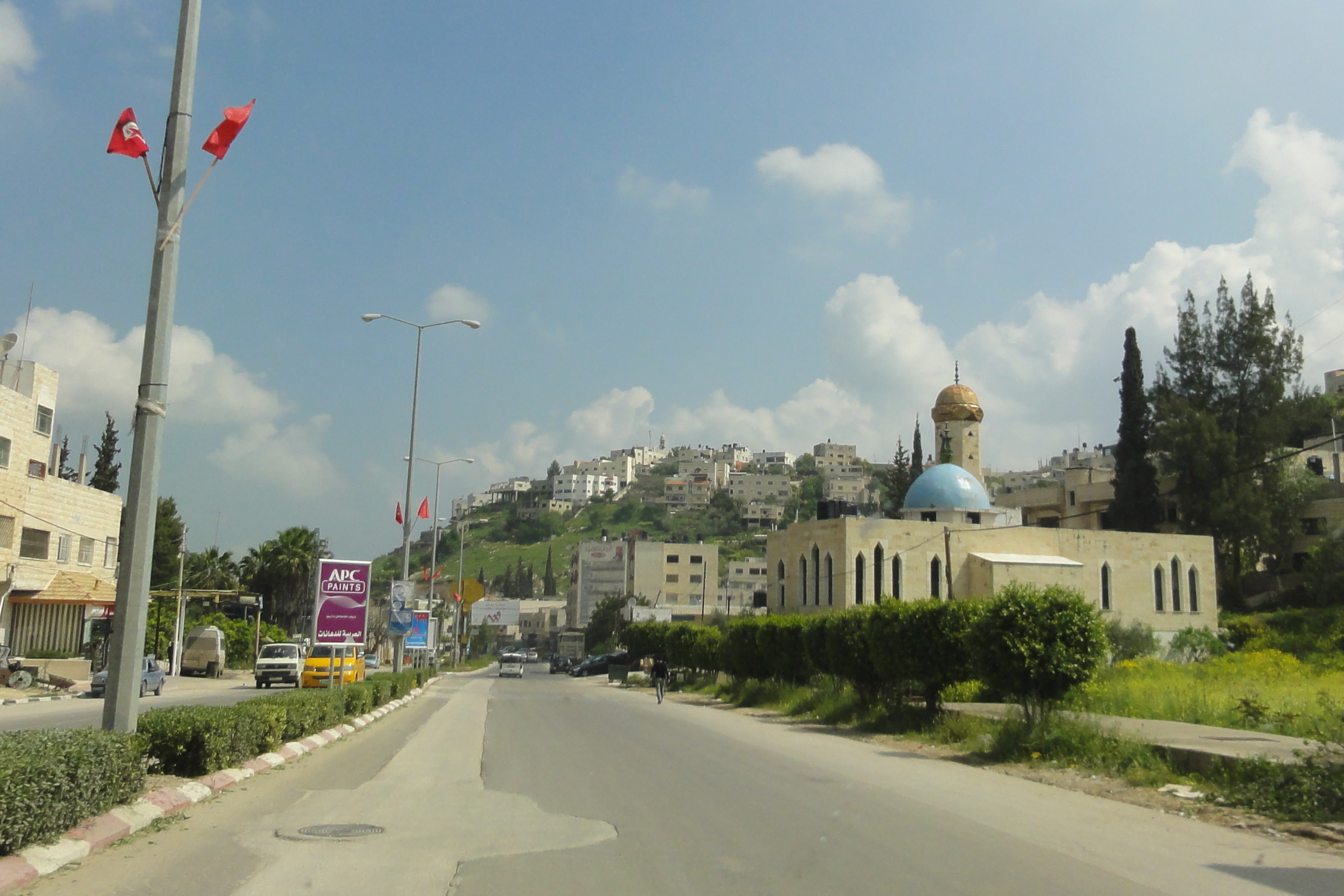
A street in Jenin

On 26 January 2023, Israeli forces killed nine in a clash with Islamic Jihad militants during a raid in the city and refugee camp of Jenin.

On 3 July 2023, shortly after 1 a.m., Israeli forces attacked the city's refugee camp using drone-fired missiles and ground troops. Eight Palestinians died from injuries sustained during the attack and a further eighty were injured, nine of them critically. Fifty Palestinians, whom Israeli forces labeled "militants", were arrested. Israeli forces cut off telecommunications and electricity in the area and medical professionals struggled to reach the injured. Israel claimed that while they were targeting suspected members of the Jenin Brigades, an armed group, they acknowledged that innocent people may have been injured or killed in the raid. Yoav Gallant, the Israeli Minister of Defense, said "The operation is progressing as planned," and Eli Cohen, the Israeli Foreign Minister, said claimed the refugee camp had become a "center for terrorist activity" thanks to funding from Iranian sources. The refugee camp has a population of roughly 17,000 inhabitants and is about a quarter a square mile in size.

On 19 September 2023, four Palestinians were killed during another Israeli military invasion of the city – among them a 15-year-old Palestinian boy, chased and killed for having noticed the Israeli undercover soldiers sneaking into the Jenin refugee camp.

During the Gaza war, Israeli forces carried out multiple operations in Jenin. On October 22, 2023, the IDF conducted an airstrike targeting an underground compound beneath the Al-Ansar Mosque in the city. It was reported to be the first airstrike in the West Bank since the Second Intifada. The IDF stated that the strike aimed at operatives from Hamas and PIJ who were planning a terror attack.

Jenin was severely damaged during the Gaza war. By June 2024 repeated bombing attacks and incursions with bulldozers by Israeli forces razed every street and reduced every public square to rubble. In one incident on 21 May, according to journalist Gideon Levy, an Israeli sniper shot dead bystanders, including surgeon Oussaid Jabareen, who was shot while on his way to work at the Jenin Government Hospital.

Aftermath of Israel raid on Jenin, August 2024

In late August 2024 Israel launched a large-scale, multi-day raid on Jenin as part of Operation Summer Camps, with one resident saying that "The water is cut off. The electricity is cut off, the sewage system is no longer working. All the infrastructure is destroyed, we no longer have any services that work." The governor of Jenin said that "The Israelis are besieging the hospitals and cutting off the city from the refugee camp, which has become a military zone with no access...neither the civil defence, nor the ambulances, nor the journalists can go and see what is happening there." The IDF, on the other hand, says that this is operation is "not extremely different from regular activity". At least 20 Palestinians were killed by the IDF in this attack, including a Palestinian man in his 80s. Additionally, the Israeli forces fired at ambulances carrying "a dead and a wounded person", leading to the injury of 2 EMTs and a volunteer doctor.

Also in August, Israeli bulldozers destroyed miles of the city, including homes, businesses and infrastructure; Israeli soldiers blocked emergency responders from assisting residents. News reports include videos of this attack, as well as assertions by the Israel Defense Forces that it is rooting out terrorism; and that it "undertakes all feasible precautions to avoid damaging essential infrastructure”, while acknowledging that these “operations in the area have caused unavoidable harm to certain civilian structures".

In December 2024, the Palestinian Authority launched an anti-militant operation in Jenin, the largest in three decades, called "Protect the Homeland". The operation aims to regain control of the Jenin refugee camp, targeting militants and those fueling instability.

On January 21, 2025, the IDF launched its own operation in Jenin, dubbed Iron Wall, aimed at clearing Jenin of militants and putting a stop to light arms being smuggled into the city. Operations in Jenin were ongoing as of late February 2025. Around 100 homes had been demolished, residents were being prevented from returning to the area by military checkpoints, and Israeli tanks had been deployed.

== Geography ==
Jenin is situated at the foot of the rugged northernmost hills (Jabal Nablus) of the West Bank, and along the southern edge of the Jezreel Valley (Marj Ibn Amer), which the city overlooks. Its highest elevation is about 250 meters above sea level and its lowest areas are 90 meters above sea level. Immediately southwest of Jenin is the Sahl Arraba plain (Dothan Valley), while further south is the Marj Sanur valley. About 1.5 kilometers to Jenin's east is Mount Gilboa (Jabal Faqqua).

Jenin is 42 kilometers north of Nablus, 18 kilometers to the south of Afula, and 51 kilometers southeast of Haifa. The nearest localities are Umm at-Tut and Jalqamus to the southeast, Qabatiya and Zababdeh to the south, Burqin to the southwest, Kafr Dan to the west, Arranah, Jalamah and the Arab Israeli village of Muqeible to the north, Deir Ghazaleh to the northeast, and Beit Qad and Deir Abu Da'if to the east.

=== Climate ===
Climate data for Jenin
Month	Jan	Feb	Mar	Apr	May	Jun	Jul	Aug	Sep	Oct	Nov	Dec	Year
Mean daily maximum °C (°F)	17.4 (63.3)	18.2 (64.8)	21.6 (70.9)	28.3 (82.9)	31.0 (87.8)	32.9 (91.2)	33.6 (92.5)	34.2 (93.6)	33.2 (91.8)	30.6 (87.1)	25.0 (77.0)	18.8 (65.8)	27.1 (80.8)
Daily mean °C (°F)	12.1 (53.8)	12.6 (54.7)	15.1 (59.2)	19.7 (67.5)	22.5 (72.5)	25.1 (77.2)	26.6 (79.9)	27.6 (81.7)	26.5 (79.7)	23.3 (73.9)	18.4 (65.1)	13.7 (56.7)	20.3 (68.5)
Mean daily minimum °C (°F)	6.8 (44.2)	7.1 (44.8)	8.6 (47.5)	11.2 (52.2)	14.0 (57.2)	17.3 (63.1)	19.6 (67.3)	21.1 (70.0)	19.8 (67.6)	16.1 (61.0)	11.8 (53.2)	8.7 (47.7)	13.5 (56.3)
Average rainy days	11.0	6.5	11.5	5.0	0.0	0.0	0.0	0.0	0.0	4.5	6.0	11.0	55.5
Average relative humidity (%)	80	84	76	67	60	63	63	65	64	65	66	74	69
Mean monthly sunshine hours	167.4	158.2	210.8	234.0	300.7	339.0	344.1	310.0	273.0	251.1	204.0	167.4	2,959.7
Mean daily sunshine hours	5.4	5.6	6.8	7.8	9.7	11.3	11.1	10.0	9.1	8.1	6.8	5.4	8.1
Source: Palestinian Meteorological Department

== Government ==
Jenin municipality was established in 1886 under the Ottoman rule with no more than 80 voters and elections were made every 4 years until 1982 when the Israeli government took control over the municipality until 1995.

List of Jenin mayors:

- Andulmajeed Mansour
- Abdulrahman al-Haj Hassan
- Ragheb Al-Souki
- Al-Haj Hassan Fazaa
- Tawfeek Mansour
- Bishara Atallah
- Hussein al-Abboushi
- Aref Abdulrahman
- Fahmi al-Abboushi
- Tahseen Abdulhadi
- Abdulraheem Jarrar
- Saleh Arif Azzouqa
- Hussni al-Souki
- Ahmed Kamal allSa'adi
- Ahmed Shawki al-Mahmoud
- Shehab al-Sanouri
- Abdullah Lahlouh
- Waleed Abu Mwais (appointed)
- Hatim Jarrar

Municipal elections were held in Jenin on 15 December 2005. Six seats each were won by Hamas and the local coalition of Fatah and the Popular Front for the Liberation of Palestine. Jenin was one of several Palestinian cities where Hamas showed a dramatic growth in electoral support. Hadem Rida was then elected as Mayor of the city, until he was arrested by the Israel Forces and spent 3 years in jail. After his release, he resigned from the position and went back to practice in his clinic in Jenin city.

== Demographics ==
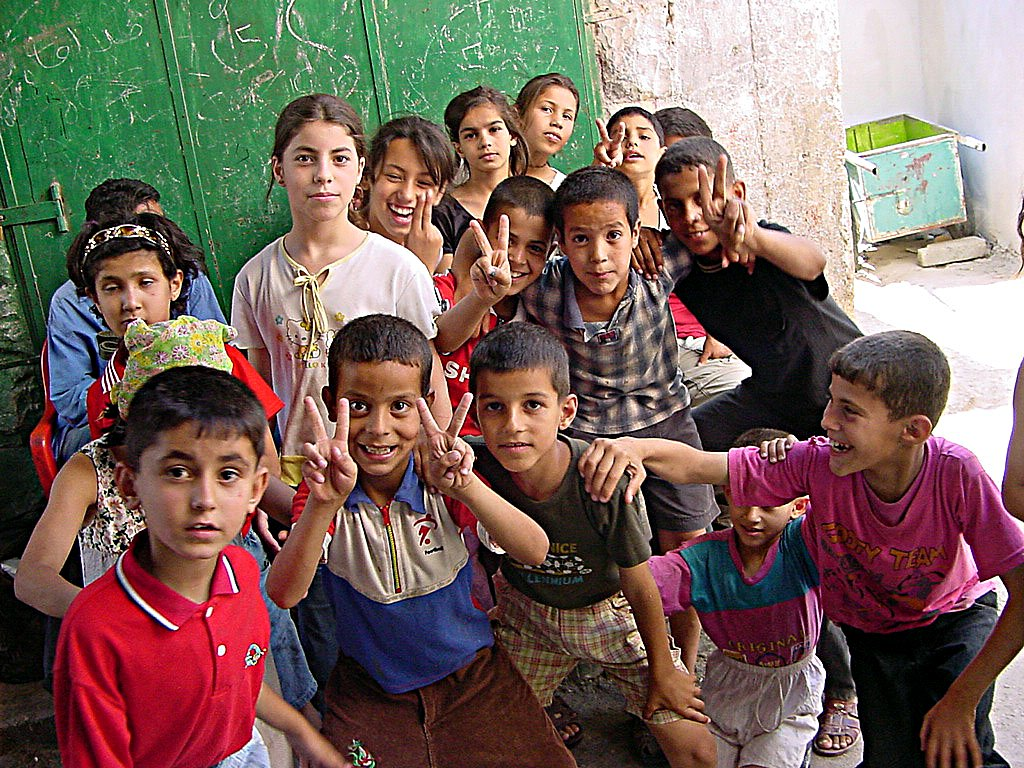
Palestinian children in Jenin

According to the 2017 census by the Palestinian Central Bureau of Statistics, Jenin had a population of 49,908, the Jenin Refugee Camp of 10,417 on 373 dunams (92 acres). Some 42.3% of the population of the camp was under the age of 15.

Year	Population Jenin City
1596	8 households
1821	~1,500–2,000
1838	~2,000
1870	~2,000
1882	~3,000
1922	2,637
1931	2,706 + 68
1945	3,990
1961	14,402
1997	26,681
2007	39,004
2017	49,908

== Public institutions and landmarks ==
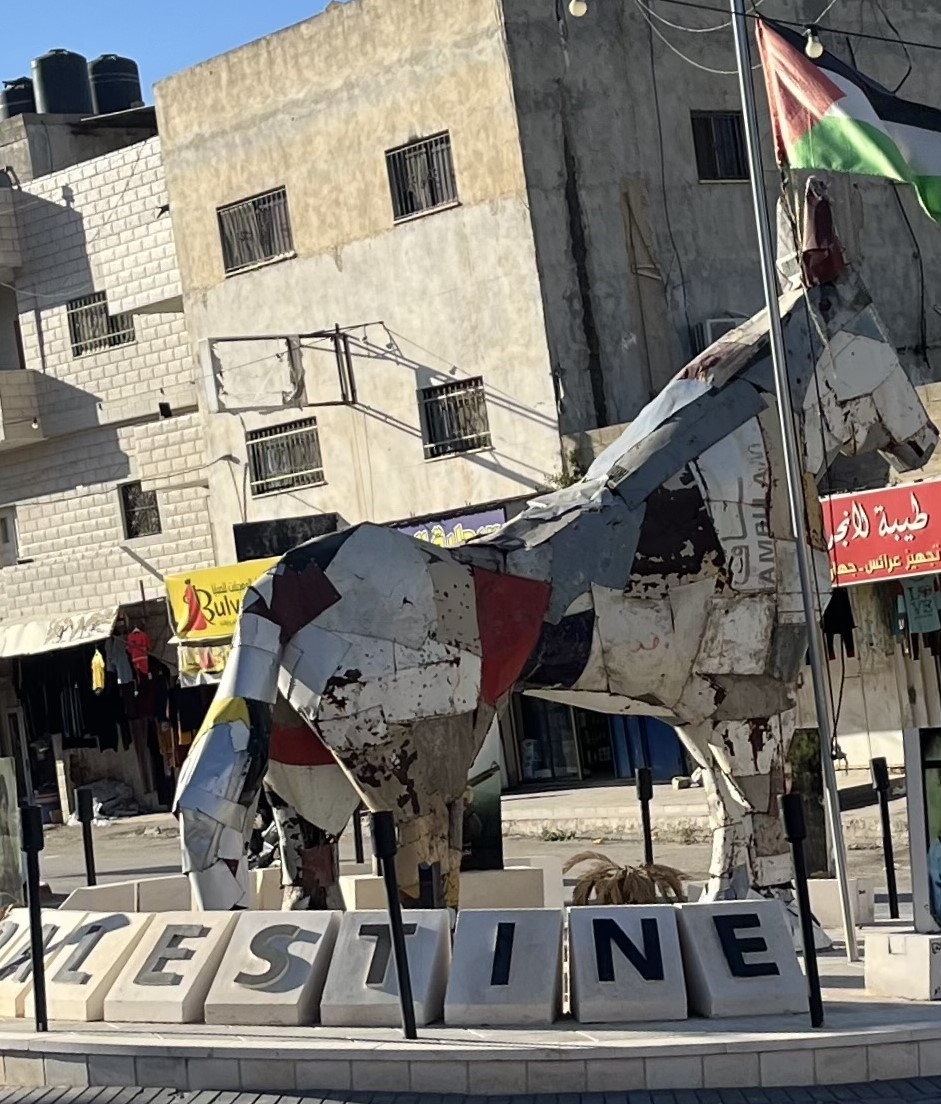
The Jenin Horse

Jenin is home to many institutions, landmarks, and works of art. The Khalil Suleiman Hospital is located in the city. The Freedom Theatre is a theatre and cinema in the Jenin refugee camp. The Jenin Horse is a famous work of art made of scrap metal from cars destroyed by Israeli forces, built in 2003 by German artist Thomas Kilpper and young people from the city. The horse was destroyed by the IDF in October 2023.

There is a monument honoring German pilots shot down in Jenin during the First World War, which incorporates an original wooden propeller. An old British Mandate landing strip, Muqeible Airfield, is located in the city.

=== Holy sites ===
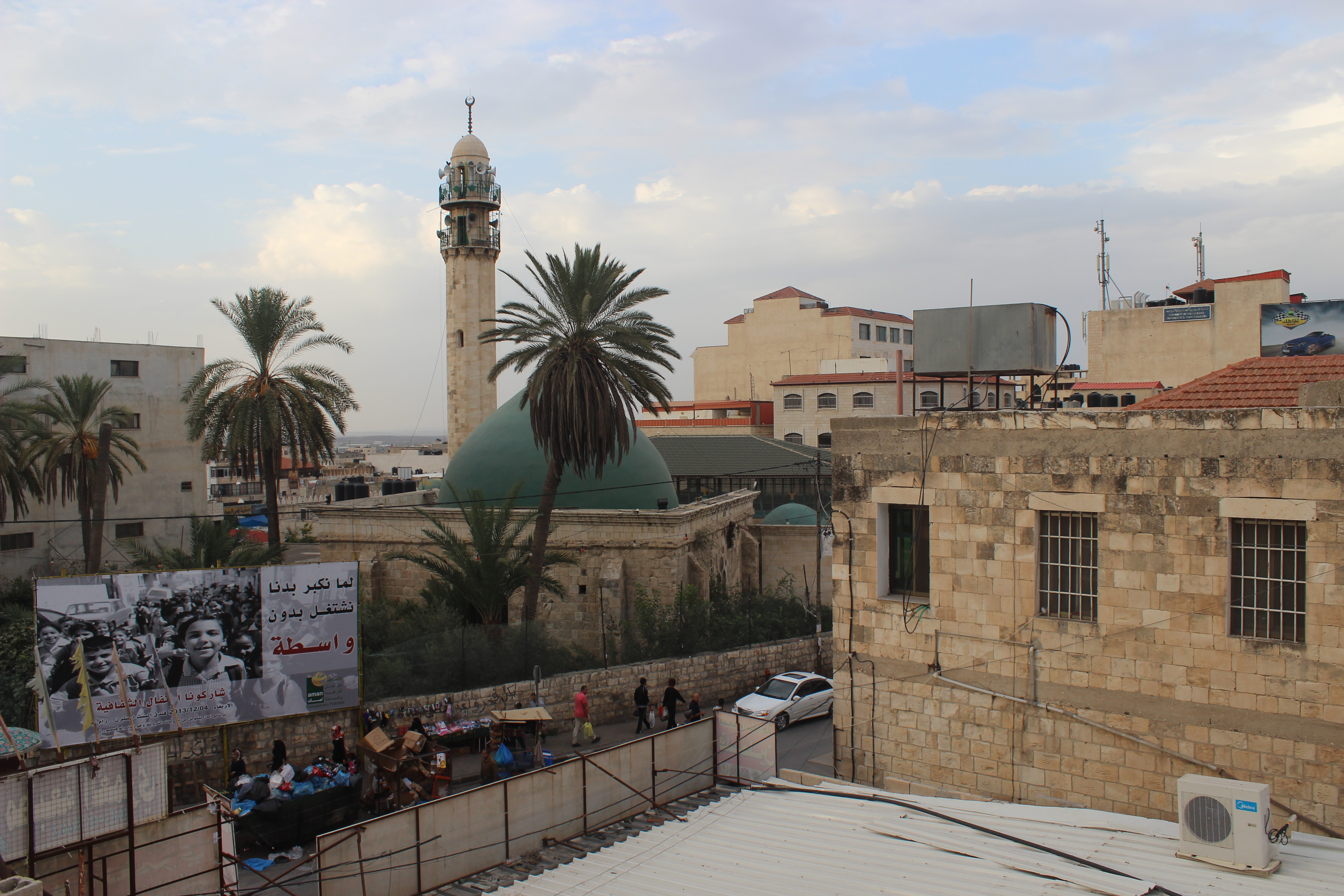
Fatima Khatun Mosque

The main and largest mosque of Jenin is the Fatima Khatun Mosque, built in 1566. Another mosque in Jenin is the Al-Ansar Mosque.

The ancient cemetery in Jenin houses the tomb of Sheikh Izz al-Din, a Sufi saint of the Rifa'i order. According to local traditions, he was a descendant of Ali Zayn al-Abidin, the grandson of Muhammad and the sixth Sh'ia Imam. According to a local tradition, Sheikh Izz al-Din fought alongside Saladin against the Crusaders. The tomb possibly predates the cemetery, which served as a burial site for the people of Jenin and the Turabay dynasty. Another tomb in the same cemetery is al-Sheikh Tarabiya, where the Turabay emir Ahmad ibn Turabay ibn Ali al-Harithi is buried.

== Education and culture ==
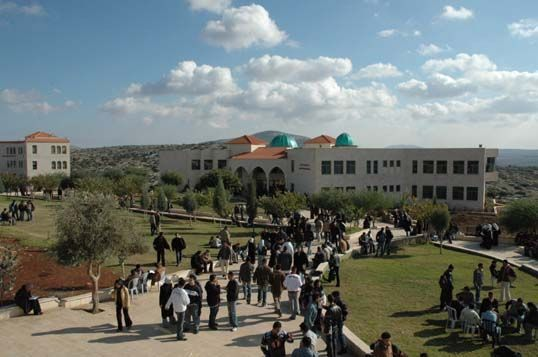
Arab American University in Jenin

The Arab American University is located in Jenin's vicinity.

Cinema Jenin is the largest movie theater in the area. The cinema, which reopened in 2010 after a 23-year intermission, has indoor and outdoor screens, a film library and educational facilities.

Strings of Freedom is an orchestra in Jenin founded by an Arab citizen of Israel, Wafaa Younis, who travels form her home in central Israel to teach music to the local youth.

== See also ==
- Sanur Citadel

== Bibliography ==
- Abu-Husayn, Abdul-Rahim (1985b). Provincial Leaderships in Syria, 1575–1650. Beirut: American University of Beirut. ISBN 9780815660729.
- Ayalon, D.; Sharon, M. (1986). Studies in Islamic history and civilization: in honour of Professor David Ayalon (Illustrated ed.). Brill Publishers. ISBN 978-965-264-014-7.
- Barron, J.B., ed. (1923). Palestine: Report and General Abstracts of the Census of 1922. Government of Palestine.
- Chatty, D. (2006). Nomadic societies in the Middle East and North Africa: entering the 21st century (Illustrated ed.). Brill Publishers. ISBN 978-90-04-14792-8.
- Conder, C.R.; Kitchener, H.H. (1882). The Survey of Western Palestine: Memoirs of the Topography, Orography, Hydrography, and Archaeology. Vol. 2. London: Committee of the Palestine Exploration Fund.
- Dauphin, C. (1998). La Palestine byzantine, Peuplement et Populations. BAR International Series 726 (in French). Vol. III : Catalogue. Oxford: Archeopress. ISBN 0-86054-905-4.
- Doumani, B. (1995). Rediscovering Palestine: merchants and peasants in Jabal Nablus, 1700-1900 (Illustrated ed.). University of California Press. ISBN 978-0-520-20370-9.
- Government of Jordan, Department of Statistics (1964). First Census of Population and Housing. Volume I: Final Tables; General Characteristics of the Population (PDF).
- Government of Palestine, Department of Statistics (1945). Village Statistics, April, 1945.
- Guérin, V. (1874). Description Géographique Historique et Archéologique de la Palestine (in French). Vol. 2: Samarie, pt. 1. Paris: L'Imprimerie Nationale.
- Hadawi, S. (1970). Village Statistics of 1945: A Classification of Land and Area ownership in Palestine. Palestine Liberation Organization Research Center. Archived from the original on 2018-12-08.
- Hadidi, Adnan (1995). Studies in the history and archaeology of Jordan, Volume 3 (Illustrated ed.). Taylor & Francis. ISBN 978-0-7102-1372-3.
- Hütteroth, W.-D.; Abdulfattah, K. (1977). Historical Geography of Palestine, Transjordan and Southern Syria in the Late 16th Century. Erlanger Geographische Arbeiten, Sonderband 5. Erlangen, Germany: Vorstand der Fränkischen Geographischen Gesellschaft. ISBN 3-920405-41-2.
- Kohl, Philip L.; Kozelsky, Mara; Ben-Yehuda, Nachman (2007). Selective remembrances: archaeology in the construction, commemoration, and consecration of national pasts (Illustrated ed.). University of Chicago Press. ISBN 978-0-226-45059-9.
- Le Strange, G. (1890). Palestine Under the Moslems: A Description of Syria and the Holy Land from A.D. 650 to 1500. Committee of the Palestine Exploration Fund.
- Mills, E., ed. (1932). Census of Palestine 1931. Population of Villages, Towns and Administrative Areas. Jerusalem: Government of Palestine.
- Negev, Avraham; Gibson, Shimon (2005). Archaeological encyclopedia of the Holy Land (4th, revised, illustrated ed.). Continuum International Publishing Group. ISBN 978-0-8264-8571-7.
- Palmer, E.H. (1881). The Survey of Western Palestine: Arabic and English Name Lists Collected During the Survey by Lieutenants Conder and Kitchener, R. E. Transliterated and Explained by E.H. Palmer. Committee of the Palestine Exploration Fund.
- Quataert, D. (2005). The Ottoman Empire, 1700-1922 (2nd, illustrated, revised ed.). Cambridge University Press. ISBN 978-0-521-83910-5.
- Rhode, H. (1979). The Administration and Population of the Sancak of Safad in the Sixteenth Century (PhD). Columbia University.
- Robinson, E.; Smith, E. (1841). Biblical Researches in Palestine, Mount Sinai and Arabia Petraea: A Journal of Travels in the year 1838. Vol. 3. Boston: Crocker & Brewster.
- Scholz, J.M.A. (1822). Reise in die Gegend zwischen Alexandrien und Parätonium, die libysche Wüste, Siwa, Egypten . F. Fleischer.
- Sharon, M. (2017). Corpus Inscriptionum Arabicarum Palaestinae, Volume Six: J (1). Leiden and Boston: Brill. ISBN 978-90-04-32515-9.
- Yazbak, M. (1998). Haifa in the late Ottoman period, 1864-1914: a Muslim town in transition (Illustrated ed.). Brill Publishers. ISBN 978-90-04-11051-9.
- Dodson, Aidan (2016) [1st pub. 2014]. Amarna Sunrise. Egypt from Golden Age to Age of Heresy. Cairo; New York City: American University in Cairo Press. ISBN 978-1-61797-560-8.
