= Arranah =

’Arrana
- Municipality type D (Village council)

Arabic transcription(s)
  - Arabic: عرّانه
- Location of ’Arrana within Palestine
- Coordinates: 32°29′50″N 35°19′20″E
- Palestine grid: 180/211
- State: State of Palestine
- Governorate: Jenin

Government
  - Type: Village council

Population (2017)
  - Total: 2,418
- Name meaning: from personal name, or perhaps from the Arab form of “a hyæna’s den”

’Arrana (Arabic: عرّانه) is a Palestinian village in the Jenin Governorate, located 4 kilometers Northeast of Jenin, in the northern West Bank. According to the Palestinian Central Bureau of Statistics, the village had a population of 2,418 inhabitants in 2017.

== History ==
It has been suggested that this was Aaruna in the list of places conquered by Thutmose III.

Ceramics from the Byzantine era have been found here.

=== Ottoman era ===
Arranah, like the rest of Palestine, was incorporated into the Ottoman Empire in 1517, and in the census of 1596, the village appeared as 'Arrana, located in the nahiya of Sara in the liwa of Lajjun. It had a population of 17 households, all Muslim. They paid a fixed tax rate of 25 % on agricultural products, including wheat, barley, summer crops, olive trees, goats and beehives, in addition to occasional revenues; a total of 9,000 akçe.

In 1838, it was noted as a village in the Jenin district.

In 1870, Victor Guérin noted it on a small hilltop.

In 1882, the PEF's Survey of Western Palestine (SWP) described Arraneh as: "A small village, principally of mud, with a few stone houses, standing in the plain, surrounded by olive-yards. It is supplied with water from cisterns. A kubbeh exists about 1/4 mile north of the village."

=== British Mandate era ===
In the 1922 census of Palestine, conducted by the British Mandate authorities, the village had a population of 216 Muslims, increasing slightly in the 1931 census to 267 Muslims, in 46 households.

In 1944/5 statistics the population was 320, all Muslim, with a total of 7,866 dunams of land, according to an official land and population survey. Of this, 13 dunams were used for plantations and irrigable land, 6,460 dunams for cereals, while 10 dunams were built-up (urban) land.

=== Jordanian era ===
After the 1948 Arab–Israeli War and the 1949 Armistice Agreements, Arranah came under Jordanian rule.

The Jordanian census of 1961 found 539 inhabitants.

=== Post-1967 ===
Since the Six-Day War in 1967, Arranah has been under Israeli occupation.

== Bibliography ==
- Barron, J.B., ed. (1923). Palestine: Report and General Abstracts of the Census of 1922. Government of Palestine.
- Conder, C.R.; Kitchener, H.H. (1882). The Survey of Western Palestine: Memoirs of the Topography, Orography, Hydrography, and Archaeology. Vol. 2. London: Committee of the Palestine Exploration Fund.
- Dauphin, C. (1998). La Palestine byzantine, Peuplement et Populations. BAR International Series 726 (in French). Vol. III : Catalogue. Oxford: Archeopress. ISBN 0-860549-05-4.
- Government of Jordan, Department of Statistics (1964). First Census of Population and Housing. Volume I: Final Tables; General Characteristics of the Population (PDF).
- Government of Palestine, Department of Statistics (1945). Village Statistics, April, 1945.
- Guérin, V. (1874). Description Géographique Historique et Archéologique de la Palestine (in French). Vol. 2: Samarie, pt. 1. Paris: L'Imprimerie Nationale.
- Hadawi, S. (1970). Village Statistics of 1945: A Classification of Land and Area ownership in Palestine. Palestine Liberation Organization Research Center.
- Hütteroth, W.-D.; Abdulfattah, K. (1977). Historical Geography of Palestine, Transjordan and Southern Syria in the Late 16th Century. Erlanger Geographische Arbeiten, Sonderband 5. Erlangen, Germany: Vorstand der Fränkischen Geographischen Gesellschaft. ISBN 3-920405-41-2.
- Mills, E., ed. (1932). Census of Palestine 1931. Population of Villages, Towns and Administrative Areas. Jerusalem: Government of Palestine.
- Palmer, E.H. (1881). The Survey of Western Palestine: Arabic and English Name Lists Collected During the Survey by Lieutenants Conder and Kitchener, R. E. Transliterated and Explained by E.H. Palmer. Committee of the Palestine Exploration Fund.
- Robinson, E.; Smith, E. (1841). Biblical Researches in Palestine, Mount Sinai and Arabia Petraea: A Journal of Travels in the year 1838. Vol. 3. Boston: Crocker & Brewster.
