= Adoni-Bezek =

Ancient Canaanite king

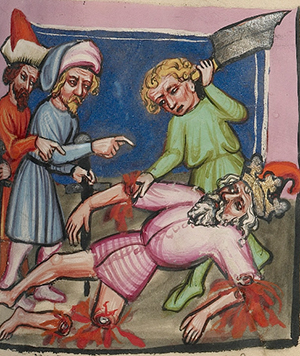
A 15th-century depiction of Adoni-Bezek being mutilated.

Adoni-Bezek (Hebrew: אֲדֹנִי־בֶזֶק ’Ăḏōnī-Ḇezeq, "lord of Bezek"), also written Adonibezek or Adoni Bezek, was a Canaanite king referred to in the Book of Judges (Judges 1:4–7). Previous to the occupation of Canaan by the Israelites, he had subdued seventy of the kings of cities around him. The tribes of Judah and Simeon attacked the Canaanites and the Perizzites at Bezek and defeated him.

The historical reality of events described in the book of Judges is the subject of ongoing dispute among scholars, who vary in their opinions about how much of the book is historical.

== Bezek ==
Some scholars propose that Bezek was near Gezer. Others suggest that the place is to be identified with Khirbet Ibzik or the nearby Khirbet Salhab, while others think that "Bezek" is a corruption of "Zedek," in reference to the story of Adonizedek. Bezek appears again in 1 Samuel 11:8 as the site where Saul assembled the Israelite armies to fight against Nahash the Ammonite.

== Mutilation ==
Adoni-Bezek, according to Judges, had removed the large toes and thumbs of kings he subjugated to render them harmless as warriors, presumably so they could no longer wield weapons or run. After Joshua had died, the tribes of Judah and Simeon continued the Israelite conquest of Canaan by leading an army against this Canaanite king. Employing the biblical law of "eye for an eye" they did the same to Adoni-Bezek before sending him to Jerusalem as a slave. Adoni-Bezek is recorded as saying "Seventy kings with their thumbs and big toes cut off used to pick up scraps under my table. As I have done, so God has repaid me." According to Elicott's Commentary for English readers, "The cutting off of his thumbs would prevent him from ever again drawing a bow or wielding a sword. Romans who desired to escape conscription cut off their thumbs".

== Later life ==
According to the Book of Judges, he confessed that God had requited him for his cruelty to the seventy kings whom he had subdued. Otherwise, nothing is known of his life after his mutilation.

== Comparison with Adonizedek ==
According to Coggins, he is probably the same person as Adonizedek mentioned in Joshua 10 who flourished c. 1200 BC. While some scholars think that the story of Adoni-bezek is a variation on the story of Adonizedek, James Martin argues that the stories are "so dissimilar" that the Adoni-Bezek narrative is most likely not "simply a variant" of the Adonizedek narrative. According to Joshua 10, Adonizedek was captured after taking refuge with four other rulers in a cave and put to death in the course of Joshua's campaign in Canaan. Adonibezek, on the other hand, was captured, in a campaign following Joshua's death, in his city (Judges 1).

His name is missing from the list of thirty-one city kings in Joshua 12:9-24, although he had subjugated seventy other kings in the Judges account. It has been argued that the latter figure may not be literally true: The Temple Dictionary of the Bible (1910) stated: '"This [70] is a round number, meaning 'many'".
