= Al-Yamun =

Town in Jenin Governorate, West Bank, Palestine

al-Yamun اليامون
- Municipality type B

Arabic transcription(s)
  - Arabic: اليامون
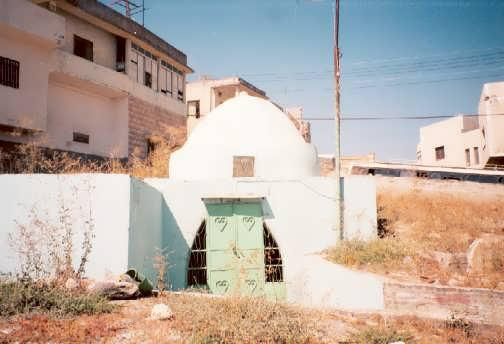

- Location of al-Yamun within Palestine
- Coordinates: 32°29′11.35″N 35°14′06.98″E
- Palestine grid: 171/210
- State: State of Palestine
- Governorate: Jenin

Government
  - Type: Municipality

Area
  - Total: 20.4 km^{2} (7.9 sq mi)

Population (2017)
  - Total: 20,774
  - Density: 1,020/km^{2} (2,640/sq mi)
- Name meaning: From a personal name

Al-Yamun (Arabic: اليامون) is a Palestinian town located nine kilometers west of Jenin in the Jenin Governorate of Palestine, in the northern West Bank. Al-Yamun's land area consists of approximately 20,000 dunams, of which 1,300 dunams is built-up area.

According to the Palestinian Central Bureau of Statistics, the town had a population of 16,383 inhabitants in the 2007 census and 20,774 by 2017. The population is formed mainly of a number of families such as Frehat, Khamaysa, Samudi, Hushiya, Abu al-Hija, Samara, 'Abahra, Zaid, Jaradat, Sharqieh and Nawahda that sourced many inspirational figures such as Jad and Ayham Frihat.

== History ==
The town is an ancient one, where two columns and two capitals have been reused at the door of the mosque.

Potsherds from the early and late Roman, Byzantine, early Muslim and the Middle Ages have been found here.

=== Ottoman era ===
In 1517 al-Yamun was incorporated into the Ottoman Empire with the rest of Palestine. During the 16th and 17th centuries, it belonged to the Turabay Emirate (1517-1683), which encompassed also the Jezreel Valley, Haifa, Jenin, Beit She'an Valley, northern Jabal Nablus, Bilad al-Ruha/Ramot Menashe, and the northern part of the Sharon plain.

In the census of 1596, the village appeared as “Yamoun”, located in the nahiya of Sha'ara in the liwa of Lajjun. It had a population of 28 households, all Muslim. They paid a fixed tax rate of 25% on agricultural products, including wheat, barley, summer crops, olive trees, goats and beehives, in addition to occasional revenues; a total of 15,000 akçe. Potsherds from the Ottoman era have also been found here.

According to local tradition, modern al-Yamun was established in the era of Zahir al-Omar, the 18th century Arab governor of Galilee, while the region was part of the Ottoman Empire.

In 1799, al-Yamun was named the village Ellamoun on the map Pierre Jacotin made during the French campaign in Egypt and Syria.

In 1838 Edward Robinson noted it on his travels, and in 1870 Victor Guérin found that Yamun had 500 inhabitants, and was divided into two quarters, each commanded by its own sheikh.

In 1870/1871 (1288 AH), an Ottoman census listed the village in the nahiya of Shafa al-Gharby.

In 1882 the PEF's Survey of Western Palestine described it as “A large village, with olives round it, standing on high ground, with a well on the east. This appears to be the 'Janna of the Onomasticon,’ 3 miles south of Legio; does not exactly agree, being 7 English miles."

=== British Mandate era ===
In the 1922 census of Palestine, conducted by the British Mandate authorities, Yamun had a population of 1,485; all Muslims except one Christian who was Orthodox. The population increased in the 1931 census to 1,836; all Muslim, in a total of 371 houses.

In the 1945 statistics the population was 2,520; all Muslims, with 20,361 dunams of land, according to an official land and population survey. 6,036 dunams were used for plantations and irrigable land, 11,121 dunams for cereals, while a total of 58 dunams were built-up, urban land.

=== Jordanian era ===
In the wake of the 1948 Arab–Israeli War, and after the 1949 Armistice Agreements, al-Yamun came under Jordanian rule. Some of al-Yamun inhabitants descended from Abu-Hija, a commander who came to Palestine with Saladin. After 1948, al-Yamun received fellow Abu-Hija descendants from the depopulated village of Ein Hod, presently in Israel.

In 1961, the population of al-Yamun was 4,173.

=== Post-1967 ===
Since the Six-Day War in 1967, al-Yamun has been under Israeli occupation. According to the 1967 Census, the town had a population of 4,384, of whom 267 originally came from Israel territory.

On October 29, 2008, Muhammad 'Abahra, a farmer in the town was killed by the IDF. 'Abahra had a shotgun in his possession leading the IDF to believe he would fire at them. 'Abahra's son, however, alleged, that his father was guarding his sheep from suspected thieves.

== Folklore ==
In the village's center, on a tell, there is a tomb-shrine named the "Maqam of Nabi Yamin" or "A-Nabi Binyamin." It is attributed to the biblical figure Benjamin, son of Jacob, and according to several traditions, he is buried there, with the village being named after him. The tomb is housed within a cave, over which the building was constructed. No one dares to enter the cave, out of belief that anyone who does will suffer a disaster. Locals maintain the site and visit it on Fridays.

Another tomb-shrine in the village is the "Maqam of ash-Sheikh Mubaraq." One tradition identifies him as a Sufi sheikh from either the 9th or 12th century CE. Another tradition associates the shrine with a figure named Abdullah ibn Mubaraq, believed to be one of the Prophet's companions, though such a figure is undocumented in Islamic history. Locals light candles and offer incense here, believing that its smell expels Satan.

The village's southern cemetery contains a third tomb-shrine, ash-Sheikh Yusef Abu al-Hija. The Abu al-Hija family descends from the same lineage as that of Kaukab Abu al-Hija in Lower Galilee. This sheikh migrated early in his life to Arraba, later moved to Kafr Qud, and died in Al-Yamun. Locals believe he can cure joint pain and intestinal gas, as well as pain in various organs, through blows to the affected areas. His grave is honored and maintained by the village.

== Demography ==
=== Local origins ===
Yamun's population includes some who originated from the Hauran region (today in Syria and Jordan) and others from Egypt. What is more, near the highway, there are people from Tubas who engage in irrigation farming.

== Bibliography ==
- Barron, J.B., ed. (1923). Palestine: Report and General Abstracts of the Census of 1922. Government of Palestine.
- Ben Ze'ev, Efrat (2011). Remembering Palestine in 1948: Beyond National Narratives. Cambridge University Press. ISBN 978-0-521-19447-1.
- Conder, C.R.; Kitchener, H.H. (1882). The Survey of Western Palestine: Memoirs of the Topography, Orography, Hydrography, and Archaeology. Vol. 2. London: Committee of the Palestine Exploration Fund.
- Dauphin, C. (1998). La Palestine byzantine, Peuplement et Populations. BAR International Series 726 (in French). Vol. III : Catalogue. Oxford: Archeopress. ISBN 0-860549-05-4.
- Government of Jordan, Department of Statistics (1964). First Census of Population and Housing. Volume I: Final Tables; General Characteristics of the Population (PDF).
- Government of Palestine, Department of Statistics (1945). Village Statistics, April, 1945.
- Guérin, V. (1875). Description Géographique Historique et Archéologique de la Palestine (in French). Vol. 2: Samarie, pt. 2. Paris: L'Imprimerie Nationale. (p. 225)
- Hadawi, S. (1970). Village Statistics of 1945: A Classification of Land and Area ownership in Palestine. Palestine Liberation Organization Research Center. Archived from the original on 2018-12-08.
- Hütteroth, W.-D.; Abdulfattah, K. (1977). Historical Geography of Palestine, Transjordan and Southern Syria in the Late 16th Century. Erlanger Geographische Arbeiten, Sonderband 5. Erlangen, Germany: Vorstand der Fränkischen Geographischen Gesellschaft. ISBN 3-920405-41-2.
- Karmon, Y. (1960). "An Analysis of Jacotin's Map of Palestine" (PDF). Israel Exploration Journal. 10 (3, 4): 155–173, 244–253. Archived from the original (PDF) on 2017-12-01.
- Mills, E., ed. (1932). Census of Palestine 1931. Population of Villages, Towns and Administrative Areas. Jerusalem: Government of Palestine.
- Palmer, E.H. (1881). The Survey of Western Palestine: Arabic and English Name Lists Collected During the Survey by Lieutenants Conder and Kitchener, R. E. Transliterated and Explained by E.H. Palmer. Committee of the Palestine Exploration Fund.
- Robinson, E.; Smith, E. (1841). Biblical Researches in Palestine, Mount Sinai and Arabia Petraea: A Journal of Travels in the year 1838. Vol. 3. Boston: Crocker & Brewster.
- Zertal, A. (2016). The Manasseh Hill Country Survey. Vol. 3. Boston: BRILL. ISBN 978-9004312302.
