= Al-Manshiyya =

Al-Manshiyya may refer to:

- Al-Manshiyya, a square in central Alexandria, and it refers to the failed assassination attempt against President Gamal Abdel Nasser by a member of the Muslim Brotherhood in October 1954
- Al-Manshiyya, Acre, village depopulated during the 1948 war
- Al-Manshiyya, Jaffa, neighbourhood depopulated during the 1948 war
- Al-Manshiyya, Safad, village depopulated during the 1948 war
- Al-Manshiyya, Tiberias, extension of Ubeidiya, Tiberias or separate hamlet depopulated during the 1948 war
- Al-Manshiyya, Tulkarm, village depopulated during the 1948 war
- Al-Manshiyya, Jenin, small village southwest of Jenin, Palestinian territories
- Iraq al-Manshiyya, village between Gaza and Hebron, depopulated during the 1948 war
- Manshiya Zabda, village in Galilee, Israel
- Al-Manshiyya, Khartoum, neighbourhood located in Khartoum

== See also ==
- Iraq al-Manshiyya, former Arab Palestinian village
- Place names of Palestine
