= Khirbet Qeis =

Khirbat Qeis
- Municipality type D (Village council)

Arabic transcription(s)
  - Arabic: خربة قيس
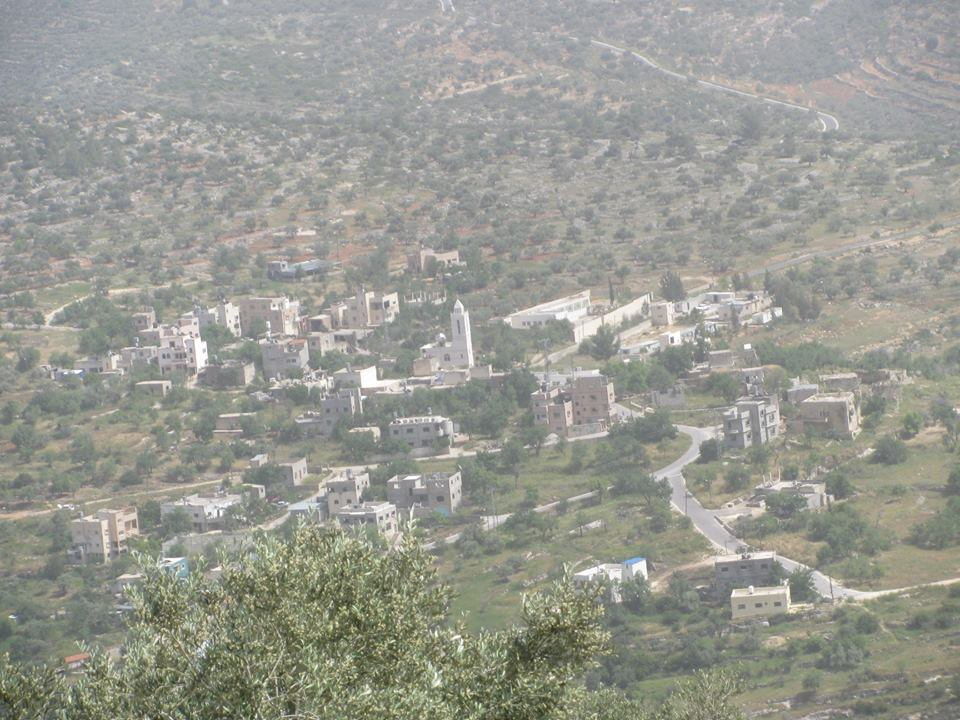
- Khirbat Qais, 2018

- Location of Khirbat Qais within Palestine
- Coordinates: 32°03′44″N 35°10′40″E
- Palestine grid: 166/163
- State: State of Palestine
- Governorate: Salfit

Government
  - Type: Village council
- Elevation: 400 m (1,300 ft)

Population (2017)
  - Total: 273
- Name meaning: Kh. Keis, the ruin of the Keis tribe, whose feuds with the Yamani faction have disturbed Syria since the time of the Caliphate

Khirbat Qais (Arabic: خربة قيس) is a Palestinian village in the Salfit Governorate in the northern West Bank. In 2010 it became a suburb of Salfit, about 4 km south of Salfit.

== Location ==
Khirbat Qais is bordered by Salfit and Farkha to the north, Bani Zaid ash Sharqiya to the west, 'Arura village to the south, and Ammuriya village to the east.

== History ==
Sherds from the Iron Age II/Persian, Hellenistic/Roman, Byzantine, Byzantine/Umayyad, Umayyad/Abbasid, Crusader/Ayyubid and Mamluk eras have been found here.

=== Ottoman era ===
In 1517 the village was included in the Ottoman Empire with the rest of Palestine, and in the 1596 tax-records the village appeared as Hirbat Qays, located in the Nahiya of Jabal Qubal of the Liwa of Nablus. The population was 4 households, all Muslim. The villagers paid a fixed tax rate of 33.3% on agricultural products, such as wheat, barley, goats and beehives, in addition to occasional revenues and a fixed tax for people of Nablus area; a total of 500 akçe. Sherds from the early Ottoman era have also been found here.

In the 18th and 19th centuries, the village formed part of the highland region known as Jūrat ‘Amra or Bilād Jammā‘īn. Situated between Dayr Ghassāna in the south and the present Route 5 in the north, and between Majdal Yābā in the west and Jammā‘īn, Mardā and Kifl Ḥāris in the east, this area served, according to historian Roy Marom, "as a buffer zone between the political-economic-social units of the Jerusalem and the Nablus regions. On the political level, it suffered from instability due to the migration of the Bedouin tribes and the constant competition among local clans for the right to collect taxes on behalf of the Ottoman authorities."

In 1838 it was noted as a village ‘’Khirbet Keis’’, part of the Jurat Merda district, south of Nablus.

In 1870/1871 (1288 AH), an Ottoman census listed the village with a population of 28 households in the nahiya (sub-district) of Jamma'in al-Awwal, subordinate to Nablus.

In 1882 the PEF's Survey of Western Palestine (SWP) described Khurbet Keis as "a small village on the hillside."

=== British Mandate era ===
In the 1922 census of Palestine conducted by the British Mandate authorities, Kherbet Qais had a population of 94 Muslims, increasing in the 1931 census to 114 Muslims in 30 occupied houses.

In the 1945 statistics the population was 170 Muslims while the total land area was 3,388 dunams, according to an official land and population survey. Of this, 1,480 were allocated for plantations and irrigable land, 572 for cereals, while 8 dunams were classified as built-up areas.

=== Jordanian era ===
In the wake of the 1948 Arab–Israeli War, and after the 1949 Armistice Agreements, Khirbet Qeis came under Jordanian rule.

The Jordanian census of 1961 found 209 inhabitants.

=== Post-1967 ===
Since the Six-Day War in 1967, Khirbet Qeis has been under Israeli occupation.

== Bibliography ==
- Barron, J.B., ed. (1923). Palestine: Report and General Abstracts of the Census of 1922. Government of Palestine.
- Conder, C.R.; Kitchener, H.H. (1882). The Survey of Western Palestine: Memoirs of the Topography, Orography, Hydrography, and Archaeology. Vol. 2. London: Committee of the Palestine Exploration Fund.
- Finkelstein, I.; Lederman, Zvi, eds. (1997). Highlands of many cultures. Tel Aviv: Institute of Archaeology of Tel Aviv University Publications Section. ISBN 965-440-007-3.
- Government of Jordan, Department of Statistics (1964). First Census of Population and Housing. Volume I: Final Tables; General Characteristics of the Population (PDF).
- Government of Palestine, Department of Statistics (1945). Village Statistics, April, 1945.
- Hadawi, S. (1970). Village Statistics of 1945: A Classification of Land and Area ownership in Palestine. Palestine Liberation Organization Research Center. Archived from the original on 8 December 2018.
- Hütteroth, W.-D.; Abdulfattah, K. (1977). Historical Geography of Palestine, Transjordan and Southern Syria in the Late 16th Century. Erlanger Geographische Arbeiten, Sonderband 5. Erlangen, Germany: Vorstand der Fränkischen Geographischen Gesellschaft. ISBN 3-920405-41-2.
- Mills, E., ed. (1932). Census of Palestine 1931. Population of Villages, Towns and Administrative Areas. Jerusalem: Government of Palestine.
- Palmer, E.H. (1881). The Survey of Western Palestine: Arabic and English Name Lists Collected During the Survey by Lieutenants Conder and Kitchener, R. E. Transliterated and Explained by E.H. Palmer. Committee of the Palestine Exploration Fund.
- Robinson, E.; Smith, E. (1841). Biblical Researches in Palestine, Mount Sinai and Arabia Petraea: A Journal of Travels in the year 1838. Vol. 3. Boston: Crocker & Brewster.
