= 1657 Ottoman campaign in Palestine =

17th c. Ottoman military expedition

The 1657 Ottoman campaign in Palestine was a military expedition launched by the Ottoman Empire to reassert control over Palestine and suppress local unrest. Particularly concentrated in Jabal Nablus, which was also known as the Nablus Sanjak.

The campaign reflected the Empire’s effort to stabilize its holdings in the region during a period marked by internal strife and decentralization. The campaign was led by Köprülü Mehmed Pasha, the influential Grand Vizier appointed to restore order in various Ottoman territories.

== Background ==
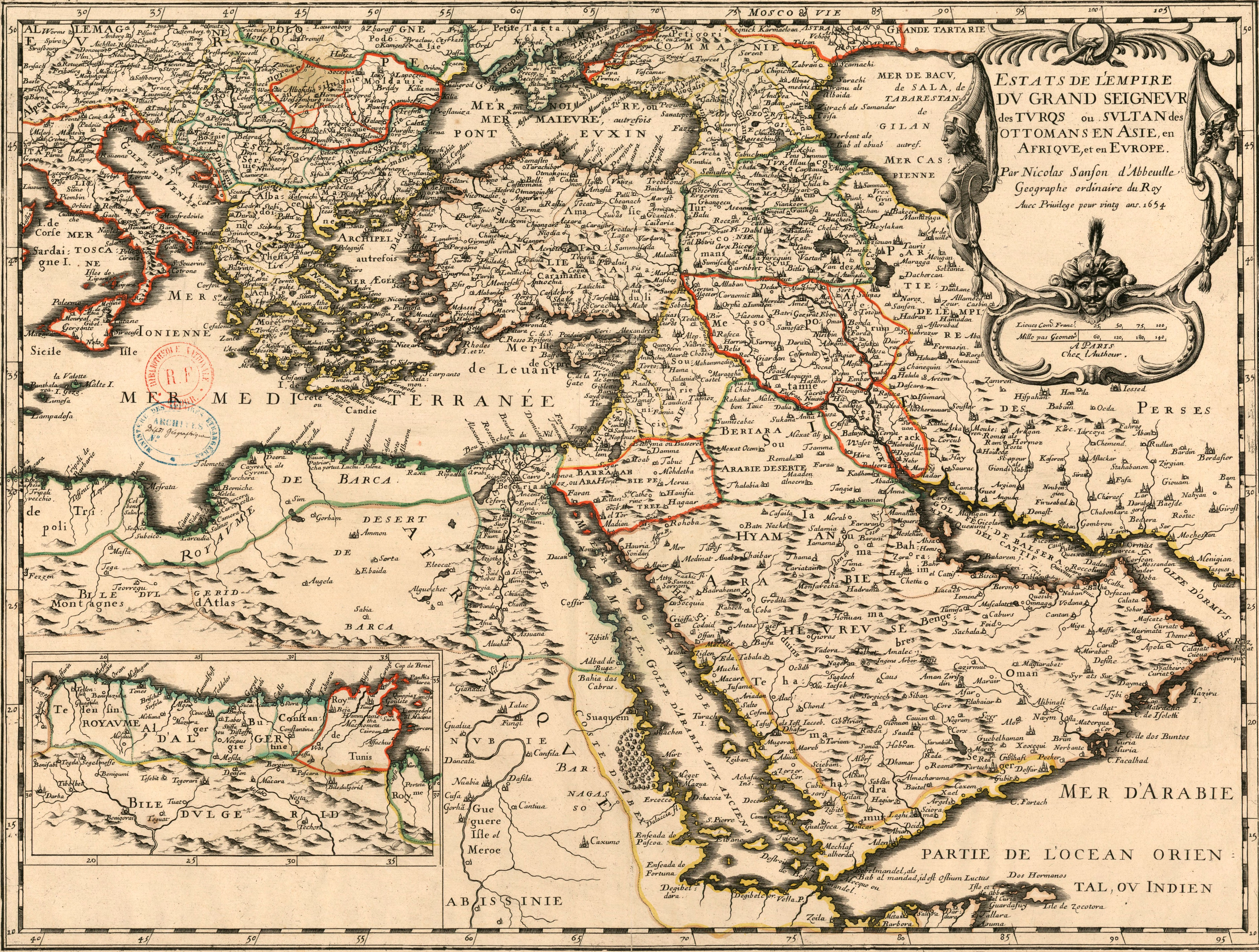
Map of the Ottoman Empire (1654), Nicolas Sanson

In the mid-17th century, the Ottoman Empire was experiencing significant internal challenges, including economic hardships, military revolts, and challenges from provincial leaders who held substantial local power. Palestine, a region within the Ottoman administrative framework and that fell within the Damascus Eyalet, had increasingly become difficult for the central authorities to control. Local leaders often defied orders from Istanbul, leading to a breakdown in central authority.

Still, a certain level of control was held over its territories by leveraging rivalries among local leaders and, when necessary, launching punitive expeditions against rebellious regions. One such expedition took place in 1657 as part of a broader Ottoman effort to restore central authority following years of widespread social and economic upheaval. Palestine was a strategic focus due to its critical role in maintaining land routes to Egypt and ensuring the security and funding of the Damascus pilgrimage caravan.

The Köprülü era, established in the early 1650s, aimed to restore Ottoman authority by strengthening administrative and military control in strategic areas, including Palestine. Köprülü Mehmed Pasha was known for his decisive actions and strict approach to governance, which sought to quell dissent across the empire. By 1657, he turned his attention toward Palestine, where unrest and local insubordination had become a pressing issues.

== Course of the Campaign ==
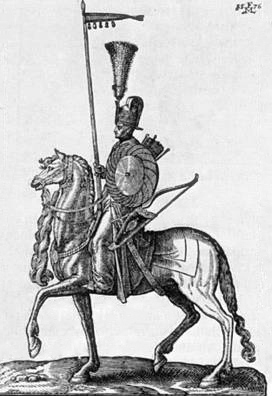
Ottoman Sipahi, Melchior Lorch (1646).

During the 1657 Ottoman campaign in Palestine, the power structure of rural areas played a critical role in shaping both resistance and control dynamics. Rural chiefs derived their authority from their ability to mobilize violence or the threat thereof. Operating from fortress-like compounds in strategic kursi villages, they established political and military strongholds. These chiefs utilized peasant militias and their knowledge of the hilly terrain to exert influence over surrounding villages and control key trade routes leading to Nablus.

By restricting or facilitating movement, rural chiefs could reward allies and punish rivals. However, direct confrontations were rare due to their extensive patronage networks, which ensured peasant loyalty in exchange for protection. Chiefs further solidified their power by marrying into influential clans, resettling their kin in key areas, and resolving disputes through customary law (urf). This decentralized rural power posed a significant challenge to Ottoman authority.

To address these challenges, the Ottoman administration initially employed its well-honed and pragmatic strategies. Rather than imposing rigid control, they adapted to local political realities. Subdistricts served primarily as "fiscal shells," designed to optimize revenue collection with minimal disruption to existing power structures.

Local leaders were co-opted into the Ottoman system, becoming intermediaries of imperial authority. Subdistrict chiefs, formally appointed by the governor of Damascus, were responsible for tax collection and maintaining order. While these annual appointments were often ceremonial, the chief positions became hereditary in practice, consolidating power within prominent families over generations. Eventually necessitating a military response by the Ottomans.

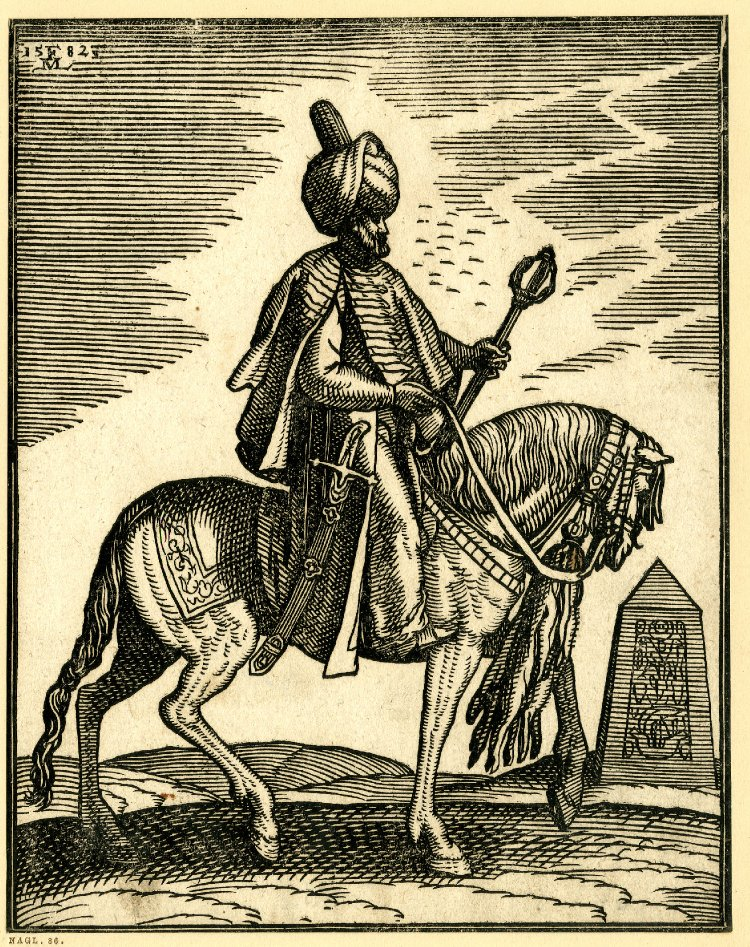
Janissary General, Melchior Lorch (1570-1583)

The campaign's military force relied heavily on Arab local militias (yerliyya) from central Syria. To compensate them, cavalry officers (sipahis) were granted agricultural lands in Jabal Nablus as timar or za‘ama, depending on the land size. To prevent any single group from consolidating power, the Ottoman government dispersed these grants geographically, assigning key villages to different holders. This land distribution was carefully managed, with annual renewals to prevent privatization through inheritance.

Additionally, the government took measures to weaken the long-term authority of rural chiefs. By fostering rivalries and dispersing economic opportunities, the Ottomans sought to undercut the chiefs' ability to organize resistance. These strategies reflected the empire's broader approach to absorbing semi-autonomous regions while maintaining sufficient local order to safeguard strategic interests, including the critical land routes to Egypt and the Damascus pilgrimage caravan.

== Legacy ==
Over time, the leaders of the 1657 Ottoman expedition gradually integrated into the local population and became more focused on managing their business affairs than on fulfilling any military obligations.

The most powerful among them constructed large, fortress-like homes, many of which remain standing today. Former subdistrict chiefs received the majority of land grants.

They quickly ascended to key administrative positions such as mutasallim and miralay (chief of the alay, or local sipahi company). Additionally, they formed strategic alliances by intermarrying with wealthy merchants, eventually getting absorbed into the general population.
