= Qira =

Qira may refer to:

- Qira County, county in Hotan, Xinjiang, China
- Qira, Haifa, a depopulated village of Palestine
- Qira, Salfit, a Palestinian village in the West Bank
- Qi'ra, a fictional character in the Star Wars franchise
