= Kufeir =

- Municipality type D (Village council)

Arabic transcription(s)
  - Arabic: كُفير
- Location of Kufeir within Palestine
- Coordinates: 32°22′18″N 35°20′28″E
- Palestine grid: 182/197
- State: State of Palestine
- Governorate: Jenin

Government
  - Type: Village council

Population (2017)
  - Total: 57
- Name meaning: El Kufeir, the little village

Kufeir (Arabic: كُفير) is a Palestinian village in the Jenin Governorate.

== History ==
Pottery sherds from the Byzantine (20%), early Muslim (50%) and the Middle Ages (20%) have been found here. A Samaritan sarcophagus has also been found here.

=== Ottoman era ===
Kufeir, like all of Palestine, was incorporated into the Ottoman Empire in 1517, and in the 1596 tax registers, it was located in the nahiya of Jabal Sami in the liwa of Nablus. Kufeir was listed as an entirely Muslim village with a population of 15 families and 6 bachelors. The inhabitants paid a fixed tax rate of 33.3% on agricultural products, including wheat, barley, summer crops, olive trees, and goats and/or beehives, a press for olive oil or grape syrup, in addition to occasional revenues and a tax on people from the Nablus area, a total of 6,702 akçe. Pottery sherds from the early Ottoman era (10%) have also been found here.

Kufeir was deserted after the 16th century, probably due to conflicts in the 17th century, where the Rasheedat clan was defeated. It was later resettled by the Rasheedat clan of Tyre, Lebanon in the mid-19th century.

In 1838, Edward Robinson described it as a small village, while in 1870, Victor Guérin noted that "it is an abandoned village, whose houses were built by Arabs of old materials, and whose antiquity is proved by the existence of the rock-cut cisterns." The tombs and cisterns marked on the SWP map are probably those referred to by Guerin as having been found there.

In 1882 the PEF's Survey of Western Palestine (SWP) noted at El Kufeir: "Ruins of an ordinary village, with 8 or 9 rock-cut cisterns and 'rock-sunk tombs, as at Iksal."

=== British Mandate era ===
In the 1922 census of Palestine, conducted by the British Mandate authorities, Kufair had a population of 66; 55 Muslims and 11 Christians, where the Christians were all Orthodox. This increased in the 1931 census to 107; 6 Christians and the rest Muslim, in a total of 21 houses.

In the 1945 statistics, the population was 140; 130 Muslims and 10 Christians, with 4,315 dunams of land, according to an official land and population survey. Of this, 429 dunams were used for plantations and irrigable land, 3,465 dunams for cereals, while 421 dunams were classified as non-cultivable land.

=== Jordanian era ===
In the wake of the 1948 Arab–Israeli War, and after the 1949 Armistice Agreements, Kufeir came under Jordanian rule. It was annexed by Jordan in 1950.

The Jordanian census of 1961 found 131 inhabitants.

=== Post-1967 ===
Since the Six-Day War in 1967, Kufeir has been under Israeli occupation.

== Bibliography ==
- Barron, J.B., ed. (1923). Palestine: Report and General Abstracts of the Census of 1922. Government of Palestine.
- Conder, C.R.; Kitchener, H.H. (1882). The Survey of Western Palestine: Memoirs of the Topography, Orography, Hydrography, and Archaeology. Vol. 2. London: Committee of the Palestine Exploration Fund.
- Government of Jordan, Department of Statistics (1964). First Census of Population and Housing. Volume I: Final Tables; General Characteristics of the Population (PDF).
- Government of Palestine, Department of Statistics (1945). Village Statistics, April, 1945.
- Guérin, V. (1874). Description Géographique Historique et Archéologique de la Palestine (in French). Vol. 2: Samarie, pt. 1. Paris: L'Imprimerie Nationale.
- Hadawi, S. (1970). Village Statistics of 1945: A Classification of Land and Area ownership in Palestine. Palestine Liberation Organization Research Center.
- Hütteroth, W.-D.; Abdulfattah, K. (1977). Historical Geography of Palestine, Transjordan and Southern Syria in the Late 16th Century. Erlanger Geographische Arbeiten, Sonderband 5. Erlangen, Germany: Vorstand der Fränkischen Geographischen Gesellschaft. ISBN 3-920405-41-2.
- Mills, E., ed. (1932). Census of Palestine 1931. Population of Villages, Towns and Administrative Areas. Jerusalem: Government of Palestine.
- Palmer, E.H. (1881). The Survey of Western Palestine: Arabic and English Name Lists Collected During the Survey by Lieutenants Conder and Kitchener, R. E. Transliterated and Explained by E.H. Palmer. Committee of the Palestine Exploration Fund.
- Robinson, E.; Smith, E. (1841). Biblical Researches in Palestine, Mount Sinai and Arabia Petraea: A Journal of Travels in the year 1838. Vol. 3. Boston: Crocker & Brewster.
- Taylor, J.E. (1993). Christians and the Holy Places: The Myth of Jewish-Christian Origins. Clarendon Press. ISBN 978-0-19-814785-5. |
- Zertal, A. (2007). The Manasseh Hill Country Survey. Vol. 2. Boston: BRILL. ISBN 978-9004163690.
