= Salhab =

Salhab ( Tubas )
- Local Development Committee

Arabic transcription(s)
  - Arabic: سلحب
  - Latin: Khirbet Salhab "خربة سلهب" (official)
- Location of Salhab within Palestine
- Coordinates: 32°21′15″N 35°22′21″E
- Palestine grid: 185/195
- State: State of Palestine
- Governorate: Tubas
- Founded: 1880 (modern settlement)

Government
  - Type: Local Development Committee (from 1999)
  - Head of Municipality: Fawze Sawafta

Area
  - Total: 5.0 km^{2} (1.9 sq mi)

Population (2017)
  - Total: 25
  - Density: 5.0/km^{2} (13/sq mi)
- Name meaning: "The Ruin of the Tall Man"

Salhab (Arabic: سلحب, also known as Khirbet Salhab) is a small Palestinian village in the Tubas Governorate in the northeastern West Bank, located four kilometers north of Tubas. According to the Palestinian Central Bureau of Statistics (PCBS) census, it had a population of 45 living in five households in 2007 and a population of 25 in 2017. As of 2007, its mayor was Fawze Sawafta.

== History ==
Salhab ( Tubas ) has been identified with the biblical town of Bezeq where Saul gathered his army to relieve Jabesh-Gilead, mentioned in the Book of Samuel. Archaeological evidence throughout the village and its vicinity, in the form of walls and foundations of ancient buildings, suggest a previous Roman or Byzantine-era presence in Salhab.

Ceramic objects from the Byzantine era have been found here.

=== Ottoman era ===
In 1596, it appeared in Ottoman tax registers as "Salhab ( Tubas )", a village in the nahiya of Jabal Sami in the liwa of Nablus. It had a population of eight households and two bachelors, all Muslim. The villagers paid taxes on wheat, barley, summer crops, olive trees, goats and beehives; a total of 4,000 Akçe.

In his 1870 visit, French explorer Victor Guérin described Salhab ( Tubas ) as "A little town, now destroyed, on a hill whose rocky sides are pierced by numerous cisterns. The place which it occupied is now covered with confused materials, the remains of demolished dwellings, and disposed for the most part in circular heaps round silos or subterranean magazines cut in the rock." According to the Applied Research Institute-Jerusalem (ARIJ), the modern settlement was re-established on the ancient khirba ("ruin") in 1880 by a family from Nablus. After the death of the family's head, Salhab ( Tubas ) 's lands were sold to immigrants coming from present-day Lebanon and Iraq. Nonetheless, no population for the village was recorded in the 1931 British census of Palestine.

=== Modern era ===
After the Six-Day War in 1967, Salhab ( Tubas ) has been under Israeli occupation.

The Palestinian National Authority (PNA) established a three-member local development committee to administer the village's affairs in 1999. The principal services provided by the committee are the distribution of water and humanitarian aid. Today, Salhab ( Tubas ) 's residents are entirely dependent on agriculture as a source of income. The village lacks educational institutions, health centers, retail shops and food markets and residents have to travel to 'Aqqaba and Tubas for access to such services.

== Geography ==
Salhab ( Tubas ) is situated in the southwestern Zababdeh Valley on a small tell ("hill") with an average altitude of 430 meters above sea level. The village's steep northern slopes are full of scattered ancient building material dating to the Roman era. In 1987 the built-up area of Salhab ( Tubas ) consists of 15 dunams and is concentrated in the western section of the tell which also contains a number of small quarries. There are 30 cisterns in the village, but the nearest source of water is the Wadi al-Far'a spring, 10 kilometers to the southwest.

Positioned off the road between Tubas and Ibziq, nearby localities include Tayasir to the east, Tubas 4 kilometers to the south, 'Aqqaba 2 kilometers to the west and Raba to the north. The total land area is roughly 5,000 dunams, 1,880 of which is cultivated with much of the remaining designated for agriculture, grazing and forests.

== Demographics ==
In the 1997 census by the Palestinian Central Bureau of Statistics (PCBS), Salhab ( Tubas ) had a population of 53 with no residents classified as refugees. There were a total of eight households. The population decreased to 45 people living in five households, the average size of which consisted of nine members in the 2007 census by the PCBS. The gender ratio was 53.3% male and 46.7% female. About 90% of the inhabitants belonged to the al-Qadossa clan while the remainder were part of the Abu Arra clan. Salhab ( Tubas ) 's residents are Muslims, although there is no mosque in the village. Worshipers attend prayers at mosques in nearby 'Aqqaba.

== Bibliography ==
- Conder, C.R.; Kitchener, H.H. (1882). The Survey of Western Palestine: Memoirs of the Topography, Orography, Hydrography, and Archaeology. Vol. 2. London: Committee of the Palestine Exploration Fund.
- Dauphin, C. (1998). La Palestine byzantine, Peuplement et Populations, Vol. III : Catalogue. BAR International Series 726. Oxford: Archeopress.
- Guerin, V. (1875). Description Géographique, Historique et Archéologique de la Palestine. Vol 2: Samarie, pt 1.
- Hütteroth, W.-D.; Abdulfattah, K. (1977). Historical Geography of Palestine, Transjordan and Southern Syria in the Late 16th Century. Erlanger Geographische Arbeiten, Sonderband 5. Erlangen, Germany: Vorstand der Fränkischen Geographischen Gesellschaft. ISBN 3-920405-41-2.
- Palmer, E.H. (1881). The Survey of Western Palestine: Arabic and English Name Lists Collected During the Survey by Lieutenants Conder and Kitchener, R. E. Transliterated and Explained by E.H. Palmer. Committee of the Palestine Exploration Fund.
- Zertal, A. (2007). The Manasseh Hill Country Survey. Vol. 2. Boston: BRILL. ISBN 978-9004163690.
