= Qarawat Bani Zeid =

- Municipality type D (Village council)

Arabic transcription(s)
  - Arabic: قراوة بني زيد
  - Latin: Qarawat Bani Zaid (official); Karawat Bani Zayd (unofficial)
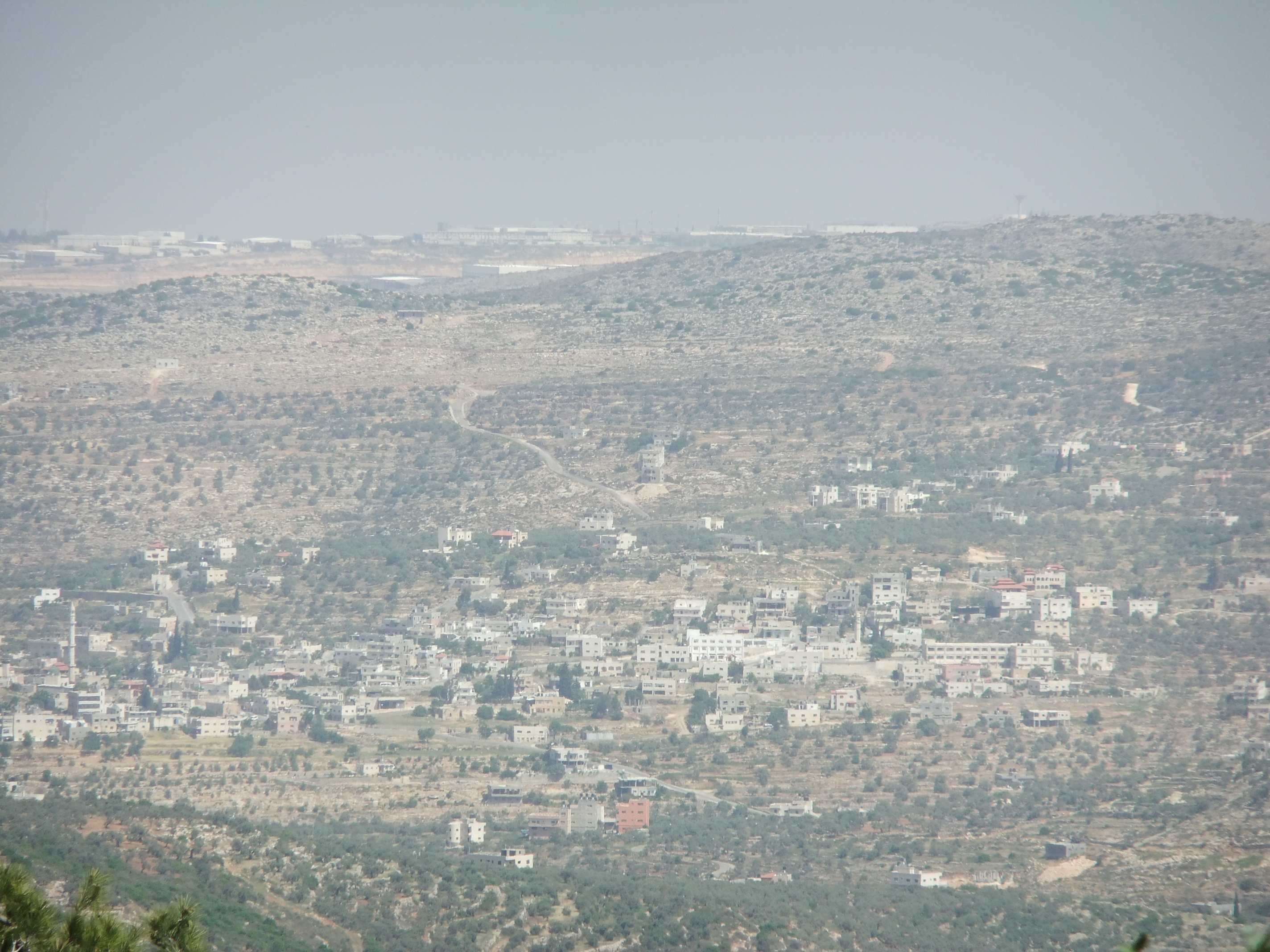
- View of Qarawat Bani Zeid, 2012

- Location of Qarawat Bani Zeid within Palestine
- Coordinates: 32°03′13″N 35°07′42″E
- Palestine grid: 162/162
- State: State of Palestine
- Governorate: rb

Government
  - Type: Village council

Area
  - Total: 8.0 km^{2} (3.1 sq mi)
- Elevation: 318 m (1,043 ft)

Population (2017)
  - Total: 3,415
  - Density: 430/km^{2} (1,100/sq mi)
- Name meaning: The towns of Ibn Zeid, in the Beni Zeid district

Qarawat Bani Zeid (Arabic: قراوة بني زيد) is a Palestinian village in the Ramallah and al-Bireh Governorate, located 22 kilometers northwest of Ramallah in the northern West Bank. According to the Palestinian Central Bureau of Statistics (PCBS), Qarawat Bani Zeid had a population of 3,415 inhabitants in 2017. Almost all of Qarawat Bani Zeid is under the complete control of the Palestinian National Authority, as it is located within Area A.

Situated close to the village mosque is the remains of a Roman pool, about 60 meters underground.

== Etymology ==
Qarawat Bani Zeid is named after the Arab tribe of Bani Zeid, that settled in the town after the Muslim Ayyubid victory against the Crusaders in 1187. The "Qarawat" portion of the name comes from the Arabic word Qaran, which means "central point", originating from the site's location between the major cities of Nablus, Jericho and Jerusalem. There is also speculation that the name comes from Qira, which means "place that respects guests". According to Palmer, the name means "the towns of Ibn Zeid, in the Beni Zeid district."

== Location ==
Qarawat Bani Zeid is located 18.1 kilometers (11.2 mi) northwest of Ramallah. It is bordered by Bani Zeid ash Sharqiya to the east and to the south, Farkha and Bruqin to the north, and Kafr 'Ein to the west.

== History ==
Potsherds from the IA I-II, IA II, lA II/ Persian, Persian, Hellenistic, Hellenistic/Roman, Roman, Byzantine, Crusader/Ayyubid and Mamluk eras have been found in the village.

=== Ottoman era ===
In 1517, the village was included in the Ottoman Empire with the rest of Palestine, and in the 1596 tax-records it appeared as Qarawa, located in the nahiye of Quds (Jerusalem) in the sanjak of the Mutasarrifate of Jerusalem. The population was 32 households, all Muslim. They paid a tax rate of 33,3% on agricultural products, which included wheat, barley, olive trees, vineyards and fruit trees, occasional revenues, goats and beehives; a total of 24,000 Akçe. Potsherds from the early Ottoman era have also been found.

In 1838, it was described as a Muslim village, called Kurawa, in the Beni Zeid district, north of Jerusalem.

In 1869, Victor Guérin found the village to have 300 inhabitants. He also noted a fragment of an ancient pillar.

An official Ottoman village list of about 1870 showed that Karawa had a total of 48 houses and a population of 200, though the population count only included men.

In 1882, the PEF's Survey of Western Palestine (SWP) described is as "a small village on a knoll, with ancient tombs, and a tank, surrounded with olives."

In 1896 the population of Karawa was estimated to be about 312 persons.

=== British Mandate era ===
In the 1922 census of Palestine, conducted by the British Mandate authorities, Karawa Beni Zaid had a population of 274 Muslims, increasing in the 1931 census to 394, still all Muslims, in a total of 88 houses.

In the 1945 statistics the population was 500 Muslims, while the total land area was 5,100 dunams, according to an official land and population survey. Of this, 3,421 were allocated for plantations and irrigable land, 219 for cereals, while 21 dunams were classified as built-up areas.

=== Jordanian era ===
In the wake of the 1948 Arab–Israeli War, and after the 1949 Armistice Agreements, Qarawat Bani Zeid came under Jordanian rule.

The Jordanian census of 1961 found 928 inhabitants in Qarawat Bani Zeid.

=== Post-1967 ===
Since the Six-Day War in 1967, Qarawat Bani Zeid has been under Israeli occupation.

After the 1995 accords, 99.7% of village land is classified as Area A, the remainder 0.3% is Area B. As of 2004, the village held no elections, but has a Village Council with representatives from each of the families who then choose a Mayor. Around 70% of the village supports the Palestinian People's Party (Communist Party), the rest support Fatah, Hamas or PFLP. About 60% of the workforce is unemployed.

== Economy ==
Qarawat Bani Zeid's main economic sectors are agriculture and traditional industries. The village's land area consists of about 8,000 dunams, 30% of which is built-up area, another 30% is covered with crops or orchards and the remaining 40% consists of either unused land or roads. The main crops that are grown are lentils, vegetables, thyme (za'atar) and sage. Grapes, as well as olive and fig orchards are also grown in the village lands. Traditional industries include basket weaving from olive wood, wool and leather-making and food manufacturing, particularly cheese.

About 60% of the village's working population are unemployed. The 40% that are employed work mostly in farming, simple commerce or teaching. However, some inhabitants work in government offices in Ramallah. There are two mosques, a hammam, a library, a social club for teenagers and a women's club in Qarawat Bani Zeid.

== Government ==
Qarawat Bani Zeid is governed by a village council. Elections are not held; rather, the council — which has representatives from the village's prominent families — select a mayor. The primary political faction is the Palestinian People's Party (PPP) and Fatah, Hamas and the Popular Front for the Liberation of Palestine (PFLP) have minor influence in the village.

== Bibliography ==
- Barron, J.B., ed. (1923). Palestine: Report and General Abstracts of the Census of 1922. Government of Palestine.
- Conder, C.R.; Kitchener, H.H. (1882). The Survey of Western Palestine: Memoirs of the Topography, Orography, Hydrography, and Archaeology. Vol. 2. London: Committee of the Palestine Exploration Fund.
- Finkelstein, I.; Lederman, Zvi, eds. (1997). Highlands of many cultures. Tel Aviv: Institute of Archaeology of Tel Aviv University Publications Section. ISBN 965-440-007-3.
- Government of Jordan, Department of Statistics (1964). First Census of Population and Housing. Volume I: Final Tables; General Characteristics of the Population (PDF).
- Government of Palestine, Department of Statistics (1945). Village Statistics, April, 1945.
- Guérin, V. (1875). Description Géographique Historique et Archéologique de la Palestine (in French). Vol. 2: Samarie, pt. 2. Paris: L'Imprimerie Nationale.
- Hadawi, S. (1970). Village Statistics of 1945: A Classification of Land and Area ownership in Palestine. Palestine Liberation Organization Research Center.
- Hartmann, M. (1883). "Die Ortschaftenliste des Liwa Jerusalem in dem türkischen Staatskalender für Syrien auf das Jahr 1288 der Flucht (1871)". Zeitschrift des Deutschen Palästina-Vereins. 6: 102–149.
- Hütteroth, W.-D.; Abdulfattah, K. (1977). Historical Geography of Palestine, Transjordan and Southern Syria in the Late 16th Century. Erlanger Geographische Arbeiten, Sonderband 5. Erlangen, Germany: Vorstand der Fränkischen Geographischen Gesellschaft. ISBN 3-920405-41-2.
- Mills, E., ed. (1932). Census of Palestine 1931. Population of Villages, Towns and Administrative Areas. Jerusalem: Government of Palestine.
- Palmer, E.H. (1881). The Survey of Western Palestine: Arabic and English Name Lists Collected During the Survey by Lieutenants Conder and Kitchener, R. E. Transliterated and Explained by E.H. Palmer. Committee of the Palestine Exploration Fund.
- Robinson, E.; Smith, E. (1841). Biblical Researches in Palestine, Mount Sinai and Arabia Petraea: A Journal of Travels in the year 1838. Vol. 3. Boston: Crocker & Brewster.
- Schick, C. (1896). "Zur Einwohnerzahl des Bezirks Jerusalem". Zeitschrift des Deutschen Palästina-Vereins. 19: 120–127.
- Socin, A. (1879). "Alphabetisches Verzeichniss von Ortschaften des Paschalik Jerusalem". Zeitschrift des Deutschen Palästina-Vereins. 2: 135–163.
- Toledano, E. (1984). "The Sanjaq of Jerusalem in the Sixteenth Century: Aspects of Topography and Population". Archivum Ottomanicum. 9: 279–319. Archived from the original on 2016-03-05.
