= Zeita Jamma'in =

- Municipality type C

Arabic transcription(s)
  - Arabic: جمّاعين
  - Latin: Zayta Jamma'in (official); Zeita (unofficial)
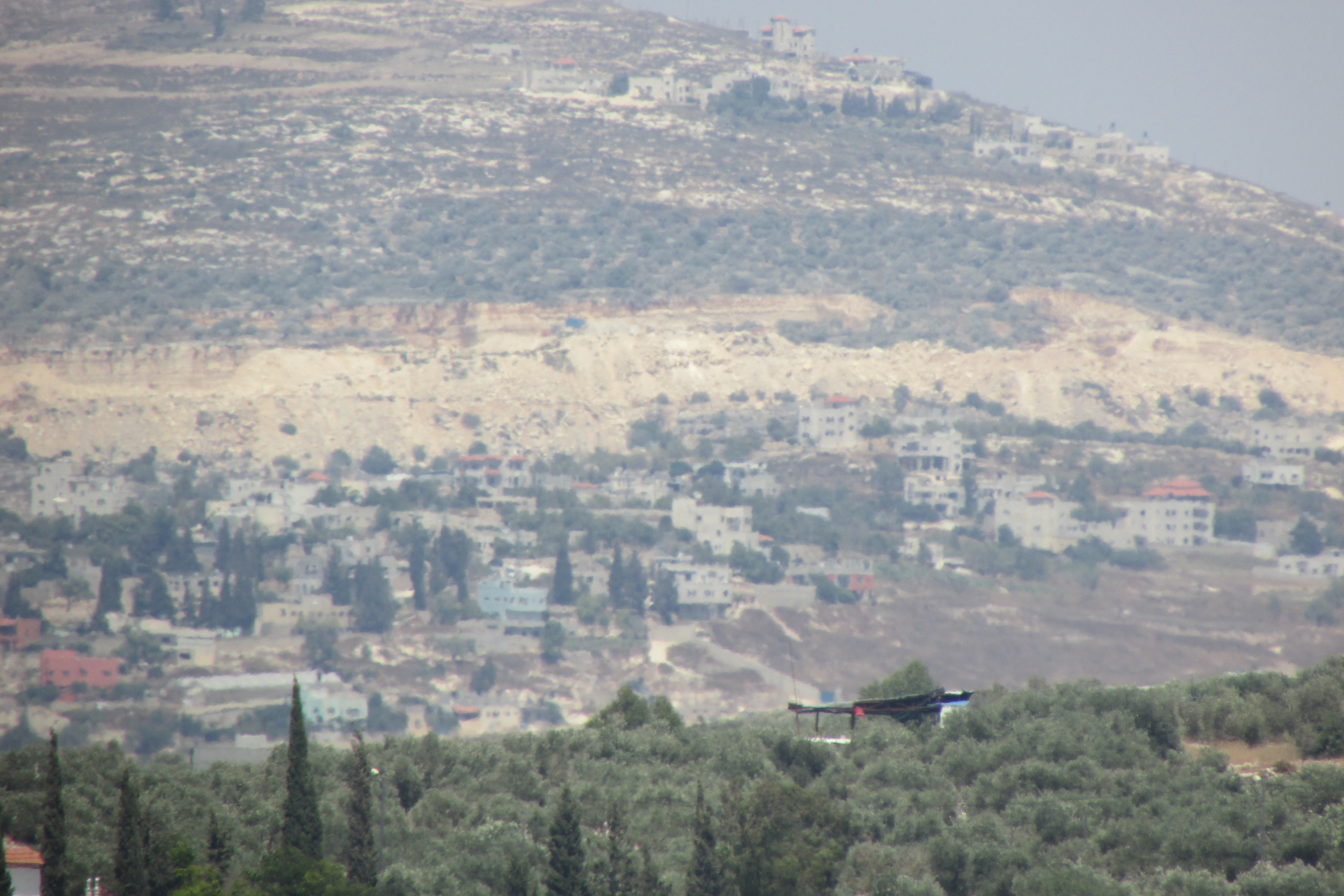
- Zeita Jamma'in from the west

- Location of Zeita Jamma'in within Palestine
- Coordinates: 32°08′N 35°11′E
- Palestine grid: 167/171
- State: State of Palestine (Limited Recognition)
- Governorate: Nablus

Government
  - Type: Municipality

Population (2017)
  - Total: 2,740
- Name meaning: olive

Zeita Jamma'in (Arabic: جمّاعين) is a Palestinian village in the Nablus Governorate in northern West Bank, located 16 kilometers southwest of Nablus. The village is located just north of Jamma'in, from which the village receives its name. According to the Palestinian Central Bureau of Statistics (PCBS), Zeita Jamma'in had a population of 2,740 inhabitants in 2017.

== Location ==
Zeita Jamma’in is a 11.6 km southwest of Nablus. It is bordered by Jamma’in and ‘Asira al Qibliya to the east, Tell to the north, Deir Istiya to the west, Kifl Haris, Qira and Jamma’in to the south.

== History ==
Potsherds, possibly from the Middle Bronze Age era was found, together with sherds from Iron Age I, and IA II, Persian, Hellenistic, Roman, Byzantine, Umayyad, Abbasid, Crusader/Ayyubid and Mamluk eras were found here.

It has been suggested that Zeita corresponds to a place of the same name mentioned in the Samaritan chronicles. The place name ends with a long vowel -ā, typically reflecting the Aramaic absolute state, a morphological feature widely attested in Palestinian toponyms.

=== Ottoman era ===
In 1517 the village was included in the Ottoman Empire with the rest of Palestine, and it appeared in the 1596 tax-records as Zayta Bani 'Amir, located in the Nahiya of Jabal Qubal of the Liwa of Nablus. The population was 26 households, all Muslim. They paid a fixed tax rate of 33.3% on agricultural products, such as wheat, barley, summer crops, olive trees, goats and beehives and a press for olive oil or grape syrup, in addition to occasional revenues and a fixed tax for people of Nablus area; a total of 10,114 akçe. Sherds from the early Ottoman era have been found here.

In the 18th and 19th centuries Zeita formed part of the highland region known as Jūrat ‘Amra or Bilād Jammā‘īn, from which it derived the second part of its name. Situated between Dayr Ghassāna in the south and the present Route 5 in the north, and between Majdal Yābā in the west and Jammā‘īn, Mardā and Kifl Ḥāris in the east, this area served, according to historian Roy Marom, "as a buffer zone between the political-economic-social units of the Jerusalem and the Nablus regions. On the political level, it suffered from instability due to the migration of the Bedouin tribes and the constant competition among local clans for the right to collect taxes on behalf of the Ottoman authorities."

In 1838 Edward Robinson noted it as a village, Zeita, in the Jurat Merda district, south of Nablus.

In 1870 Victor Guérin noted it, situated on a hill lower than that of Jamma'in. It was also surrounded by plantations of olive and fig trees, and contained eight hundred inhabitants.

In 1870/1871 (1288 AH) an Ottoman census listed the village in the nahiya (sub-district) of Jamma'in al-Thani, subordinate to Nablus.

In 1882 the PEF's Survey of Western Palestine (SWP) described Zeita as: "a small stone village, on high ground, with a well to the west, and olive groves."

=== British Mandate era ===
In the 1922 census of Palestine conducted by the British Mandate authorities, Zeita had a population of 283 Muslims, increasing in the 1931 census to 404 Muslims and 1 Christian, in 113 houses.

In the 1945 statistics the population was 510 Muslims, while the total land area was 12,887 dunams, according to an official land and population survey. Of this, 2,429 dunams were for plantations and irrigable land, 4,277 for cereals, while 43 dunams were classified as built-up areas.

=== Jordanian era ===
In the wake of the 1948 Arab–Israeli War, and after the 1949 Armistice Agreements, Zeita Jamma'in came under Jordanian rule.

The Jordanian census of 1961 found 708 inhabitants.

=== Post 1967 ===
Since the Six-Day War in 1967, Zeita Jamma'in has been under Israeli occupation.

After the 1995 accords 99.7% of village land is declared to be Area B land, while 0.3% is Area C.

== Bibliography ==
- Barron, J.B., ed. (1923). Palestine: Report and General Abstracts of the Census of 1922. Government of Palestine.
- Conder, C.R.; Kitchener, H.H. (1882). The Survey of Western Palestine: Memoirs of the Topography, Orography, Hydrography, and Archaeology. Vol. 2. London: Committee of the Palestine Exploration Fund.
- Dauphin, C. (1998). La Palestine byzantine, Peuplement et Populations. BAR International Series 726 (in French). Vol. III : Catalogue. Oxford: Archeopress. ISBN 0-860549-05-4.
- Finkelstein, I.; Lederman, Zvi, eds. (1997). Highlands of many cultures. Tel Aviv: Institute of Archaeology of Tel Aviv University Publications Section. ISBN 965-440-007-3.
- Government of Jordan, Department of Statistics (1964). First Census of Population and Housing. Volume I: Final Tables; General Characteristics of the Population (PDF).
- Government of Palestine, Department of Statistics (1945). Village Statistics, April, 1945.
- Guérin, V. (1875). Description Géographique Historique et Archéologique de la Palestine (in French). Vol. 2: Samarie, pt. 2. Paris: L'Imprimerie Nationale.
- Hadawi, S. (1970). Village Statistics of 1945: A Classification of Land and Area ownership in Palestine. Palestine Liberation Organization Research Center.
- Hütteroth, W.-D.; Abdulfattah, K. (1977). Historical Geography of Palestine, Transjordan and Southern Syria in the Late 16th Century. Erlanger Geographische Arbeiten, Sonderband 5. Erlangen, Germany: Vorstand der Fränkischen Geographischen Gesellschaft. ISBN 3-920405-41-2.
- Mills, E., ed. (1932). Census of Palestine 1931. Population of Villages, Towns and Administrative Areas. Jerusalem: Government of Palestine.
- Palmer, E.H. (1881). The Survey of Western Palestine: Arabic and English Name Lists Collected During the Survey by Lieutenants Conder and Kitchener, R. E. Transliterated and Explained by E.H. Palmer. Committee of the Palestine Exploration Fund.
- Robinson, E.; Smith, E. (1841). Biblical Researches in Palestine, Mount Sinai and Arabia Petraea: A Journal of Travels in the year 1838. Vol. 3. Boston: Crocker & Brewster.
