= Kafr Qud =

- Municipality type D (Village council)

Arabic transcription(s)
  - Arabic: كفر قود
  - Latin: Kafr Qad (official)
- Location of Kafr Qud within Palestine
- Coordinates: 32°27′26″N 35°13′38″E
- Palestine grid: 171/207
- State: State of Palestine
- Governorate: Jenin

Government
  - Type: Village council

Population (2017)
  - Total: 1,553
- Name meaning: The village of Qud

Kafr Qud (Arabic: كفر قود, also spelled Kafr Qad) is a Palestinian village in the Jenin Governorate in the northern West Bank, located west of Jenin. According to the Palestinian Central Bureau of Statistics (PCBS) census, it had a population of 1,143 in 2007 and 1,553 in 2017.

== History ==
The village is situated on an ancient site, with cisterns cut out of rock, and old stones reused in housing.

Pottery sherds from the Persian, Hellenistic, early and late Roman, Byzantine, early Muslim and Medieval eras have been found here.

=== Ottoman era ===
Kafr Qud, like the rest of Palestine, was incorporated into the Ottoman Empire in 1517, and in the census of 1596, the village appeared as "Kafr Qud" in the nahiya of Jabal Sami in the liwa of Nablus. It had a population of 19 households and 5 bachelors, all Muslim. The villagers paid a fixed tax-tare of 33.3% on various agricultural products, including wheat, barley, summer crops, olive trees, goats and beehives, in addition to occasional revenues; a total of 2,567 akçe.

Edward Robinson identified Kafr Qud with "Caparcotia" when he passed by in June 1838, part of the esh–Sha'rawiyeh esh–Shurkiyeh District.

On 14 June 1870 Victor Guérin noted that Kafr Qud was "hidden in the mountains with groves of olives and fig trees ... and very probably the place is Caparcotani of Ptolemy and the Peutinger map." He estimated the population to be 300.

In 1870/1871 (1288 AH), an Ottoman census listed the village in the nahiya (sub-district) of al-Sha'rawiyya al-Sharqiyya.

In 1882 the PEF's Survey of Western Palestine described Kafr Qud as a "good-sized village in a recess among the hills.”

=== British Mandate era ===
In the 1922 census of Palestine, conducted by the British Mandate authorities, Kufr Qud had a population of 161; 153 Muslims and 8 Christians, where the Christians were all Orthodox. This was almost unchanged in the 1931 census, when Kafr Qud had 41 occupied houses and a population of 162; 9 Christians and the rest Muslim.

In the 1945 statistics, the population was 250; 240 Muslims and 10 Christians, with 5463 dunams of land, according to an official land and population survey. 908 dunams were used for plantations and irrigable land, 2,170 dunams for cereals, while 14 dunams were built-up (urban) land.

=== Jordanian era ===
In the wake of the 1948 Arab–Israeli War, and after the 1949 Armistice Agreements, Kafr Qud came under Jordanian rule. It was annexed by Jordan in 1950.

In 1961, the population was 362 persons.

=== Post-1967 ===
Since the Six-Day War in 1967, Kafr Qud has been under Israeli occupation. The population Kafar Qud in the 1967 census conducted by Israel was 374, of whom 110 originated from the Israeli territory.

On 6 August 2024, three Palestinians were killed by Israeli forces during a raid in the village.

== Geography ==
Kafr Qud is situated in the northern Sahl Arraba on narrow ravine below the Jabal Shibli mountain to the north. It has an average elevation of 330 meters above sea level. The Bir al-Balad (also known as "Bir Kafr Qud") spring inside the village serves as the closest source of water. It is located south of the road connecting al-Hashimiya with Jenin, and nearby localities include the former to the northwest, Kufeirit to the southwest, al-Manshiyya to the south and Burqin to the east.

The ancient site in the middle of Kafr Qud is small and surrounded by a gully near the Bir al-Balad spring. Most of the modern housing was built east of the site, although ancient building material is highly present in some walls. In 1979 the built-up area of the village amounted to roughly 15 dunams.

== Bibliography ==
- Barron, J.B., ed. (1923). Palestine: Report and General Abstracts of the Census of 1922. Government of Palestine.
- Conder, C.R.; Kitchener, H.H. (1882). The Survey of Western Palestine: Memoirs of the Topography, Orography, Hydrography, and Archaeology. Vol. 2. London: Committee of the Palestine Exploration Fund.
- Dauphin, C. (1998). La Palestine byzantine, Peuplement et Populations. BAR International Series 726 (in French). Vol. III : Catalogue. Oxford: Archeopress. ISBN 0-860549-05-4.
- Government of Jordan, Department of Statistics (1964). First Census of Population and Housing. Volume I: Final Tables; General Characteristics of the Population (PDF).
- Government of Palestine, Department of Statistics (1945). Village Statistics, April, 1945.
- Guérin, V. (1875). Description Géographique Historique et Archéologique de la Palestine (in French). Vol. 2: Samarie, pt. 2. Paris: L'Imprimerie Nationale.
- Hadawi, S. (1970). Village Statistics of 1945: A Classification of Land and Area ownership in Palestine. Palestine Liberation Organization Research Center.
- Hütteroth, W.-D.; Abdulfattah, K. (1977). Historical Geography of Palestine, Transjordan and Southern Syria in the Late 16th Century. Erlanger Geographische Arbeiten, Sonderband 5. Erlangen, Germany: Vorstand der Fränkischen Geographischen Gesellschaft. ISBN 3-920405-41-2.
- Mills, E., ed. (1932). Census of Palestine 1931. Population of Villages, Towns and Administrative Areas. Jerusalem: Government of Palestine.
- Palmer, E.H. (1881). The Survey of Western Palestine: Arabic and English Name Lists Collected During the Survey by Lieutenants Conder and Kitchener, R. E. Transliterated and Explained by E.H. Palmer. Committee of the Palestine Exploration Fund.
- Robinson, E.; Smith, E. (1841). Biblical Researches in Palestine, Mount Sinai and Arabia Petraea: A Journal of Travels in the year 1838. Vol. 3. Boston: Crocker & Brewster.
- Zertal, A. (2004). The Manasseh Hill Country Survey. Vol. 1. Boston: BRILL. ISBN 9004137564.
