= Nablus Sanjak =

Ottoman administrative area in the Levant (1549–1918)

Sanjak of Nablus نابلس سنجاغى
- Sanjak of the Ottoman Empire
- 1549–1918
- Capital: Nablus
- Area
  - Coordinates: 32°10′N 35°10′E
- Historical era: Ottoman Palestine
  - Established: 1549
  - Ottoman campaign: 1657
  - Tanzimat reforms: 19th century
  - Battle of Nablus: 1918
- Contained within
  - Eyalet: Damascus (1549–1856)
  - Eyalet: Sidon (1856–1864)
  - Vilayet: Syria (1864–1888)
  - Vilayet: Beirut (1888–1918)
Succeeded by
Occupied Enemy Territory Administration
- Today part of: Palestine; Israel

The Nablus Sanjak (Ottoman Turkish: نابلس سنجاغى, romanized: Nablus Sancağı; Arabic: سنجق نابلس) was an administrative area that existed throughout Ottoman rule in the Levant (1517–1917). It was administratively part of the Damascus Eyalet until 1864 when it became part of Syria Vilayet and then the Beirut Vilayet in 1888.

== History ==
=== Early Ottoman rule ===
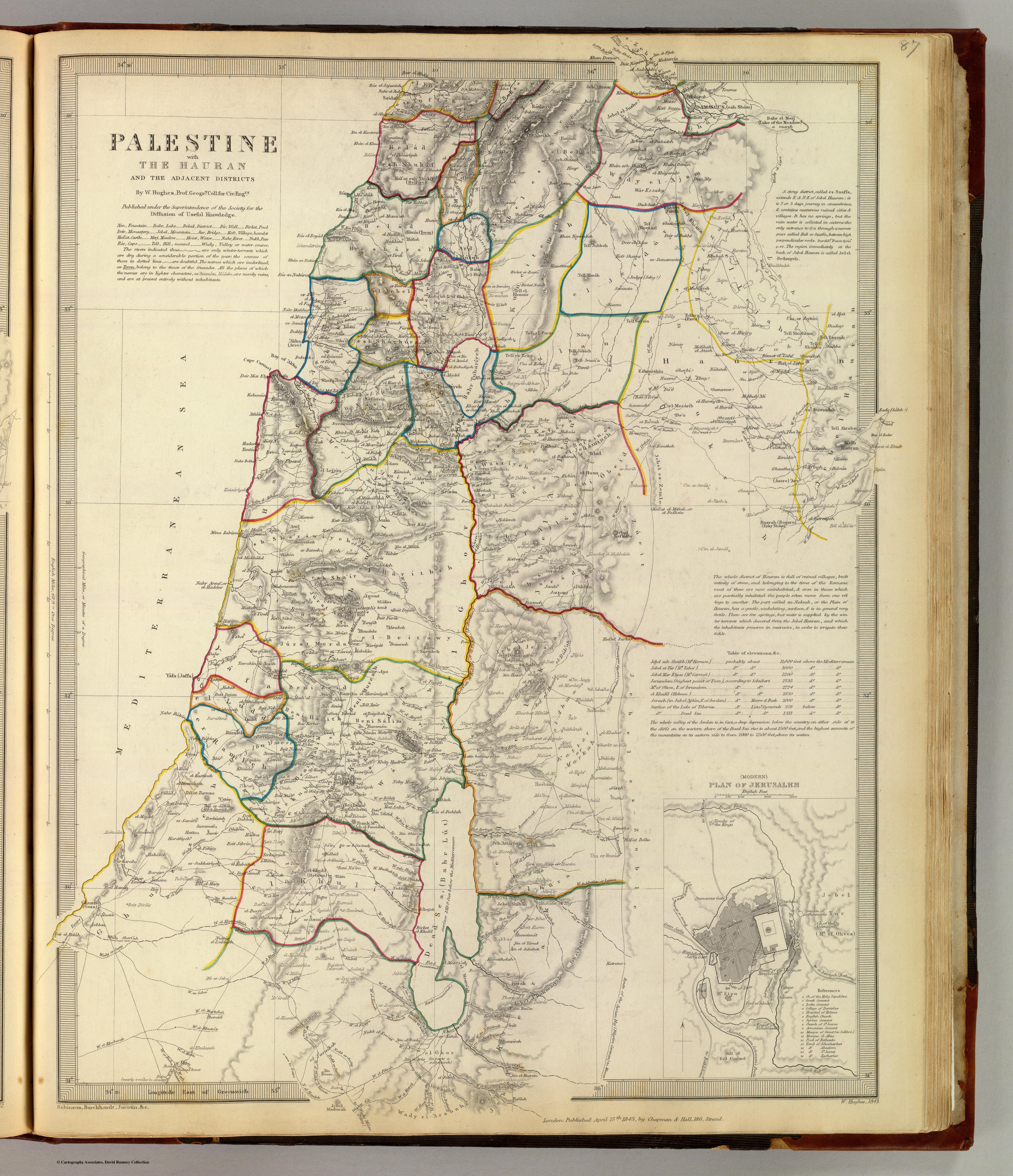
Palestine with the Hauran and the adjacent districts, William Hughes 1843

In the 1596- daftar, the Sanjak of Nablus contained the following subdivisions and villages/towns. The majority of the residents were Muslim fellahin of the Shafiite and Hanbali rites.

In the late 17th century, civil wars and unrest destabilized the Levant. To restore control, the Ottomans enforced population transfers to Palestine (sürgün). These relocations attempted to secure elite loyalty, rebuild war-torn areas, ease demographic pressures, repopulate uninhabited areas, and better deploy labor for imperial needs. Some of the exiled families, including the Banū Ghāzī (Qāsim and Rayyān) and the Shuqran (Jarrār and ʿAbd al-Hādī), replaced earlier rural elites in the Nablus highlands during the 18th and 19th centuries.

==== Nahiya Jabal Shami ====
- Tayasir, 'Aqqaba, Tammun, Tubas, Sir, Talluza, Fandaqumiya, Jaba, Burqa, Zawata, Ijnisinya, Rama, Ajjah, Attil, Kafr Rumman, Shufa, Beit Lid, Saffarin, Yasid Kufeir, Baqa al-Gharbiyye, Ramin, Zemer, Anabta, Bal'a, Qabatiya, Al-Judeida, Arraba, Yabad, Kufeirit, Burqin, Asira ash-Shamaliya, Kafr Qud, Mirka, Siris, Meithalun, Kafr al-Labad, Sanur, Sebastia, Nisf Jubeil, Qusin, Silat ad-Dhahr, Raba, Salhab, Al-Attara, Bizziriya, Fahma, Beit Imrin, Seida, Zawiya

==== Nahiya Jabal Qubal ====
- Salim, Beit Dajan, Awarta, Einabus, Urif, Al-Lubban ash-Sharqiya, Madama, Iskaka, Aqraba, Zeita Jamma'in, Kifl Hares, Marda, Mas-ha, Haris, Qabalan, Zawiya, Burin, Al-Lubban al-Gharbi, Al-Mughayyir, Salfit, Huwara, Beit Iba, Kafr Thulth, Qarawat Bani Hassan, Jamma'in, Qira, Kafr Qaddum, Khirbet Qeis, Majdal Bani Fadil, Talfit, Duma, Fara'ata, Jit, Bruqin, Beita, Hableh, Balata al-Balad, Farkha, Rafat, Odala, Yasuf, Sarra, Tell, Asira al-Qibliya, Kafr Qallil, Qusra, Jurish, Yanun, Azmut, Osarin, Sarta, Yatma, Al-Muzayri'a, Ammuriya, Immatain, Rantis, Askar (camp), Beit Wazan, Deir Istiya, Jalud, Biddya, Majdal Yaba, As-Sawiya

==== Nahiya Qaqun ====
- Kafr Rai, Zeita, Tulkarm, Iktaba, Dhinnaba, Zemer, Qaqun

==== Nahiya Bani Sa'b ====
- Al-Funduq, Jinsafut, Hajjah, Kafr Sur, Al-Jammasin al-Gharbi, Jarisha, Baqat al-Hatab, Falamya (Falāma, Falameh), Far'un, Qalansawe, Qalqilyah, Jaljulia, Kafr Saba, Kafr Zibad, Kur, Sir, Jayyous, Kafr Abbush, Kafr Laqif, Islah, Tayibe, Fardisya, Al-Ras, Al-Jammasin al-Sharqi

=== Later Ottoman rule ===
In the 19th century, it consisted of nearly 113 towns and villages, in addition to the city of Nablus. From the 17th to the early 20th century it maintained its autonomy of Ottoman rule, mostly due to the mountainous terrain and Nablus's strategic location between Mount Ebal and Mount Gerizim. The rulers of the district composed of several Arab families, some originating from northern Syrian cities, some from Balqa, in modern-day Jordan, and others were indigenous to Nablus. The primary rural noble families were the Tuqan, Jarrar, Abd al-Hadi, Jayyusi, Nimr, Rayyan, Qasim, At'ut, al-Hajj Muhammad, Ghazi and Jaradat.

On Major R Huber's 1899 map of the Ottoman Empire, Sandjak Nablouz comprised four cazas ("subdistricts"): Nablouz; Djénin; Beni Saâb with the centre in Toul Karem; and Djemaïn with the centre in Akrabé. The four cazas were further subdivided into nine nahiés, totalling 58 villages.

The peripheral hinterland of Nablus followed the provincial centre, led by a closely knit web of economic, social and political relations between Nablus’ urban notables and the city’s surroundings. With the help of rural trading partners, these urban notables established trading monopolies that transformed Jabal Nablus’ autarkic economy into an export-driven market, shipping vast quantities of cash crops and finished goods to off-shore markets. Increasing demand for these commodities in the Ottoman Empire’s urban centres and in Europe spurred demographic growth and settlement expansion in the lowlands surrounding Jabal Nablus.

Indeed, the District of Nablus was economically active in growing olives which they used to produce olive oil, olive wood baskets and Nabulsi soap. Cotton was also a major cash crop. Most economic activity was based in Nablus, however the surrounding towns and villages supplied the crude product. The ruling families completely controlled all production soap and olive oil and the exporting of cotton, while the peasantry served as the farmers, laborers and were forced to pay taxes to the families. In return, the ruling families protected the villages and met municipal needs.

During the British Mandate, the Nablus District consisted of all of the present-day Nablus Governorate, southern portions of the Qalqilya Governorate, the entire Tubas Governorate, northern portions of the Salfit Governorate and the northern Jericho Governorate.

== See also ==
- Abd al-Hadi Palace
- Touqan Palace
- Jacir Palace
- Al-Nimr Palace

== Bibliography ==
- Doumani, B. (1995). Rediscovering Palestine: Merchants and Peasants in Jabal Nablus. University of California Press.
- Hütteroth, W.-D.; Abdulfattah, K. (1977). Historical Geography of Palestine, Transjordan and Southern Syria in the Late 16th Century. Erlanger Geographische Arbeiten, Sonderband 5. Erlangen, Germany: Vorstand der Fränkischen Geographischen Gesellschaft. ISBN 3-920405-41-2.
