= Jordan–Kenya relations =

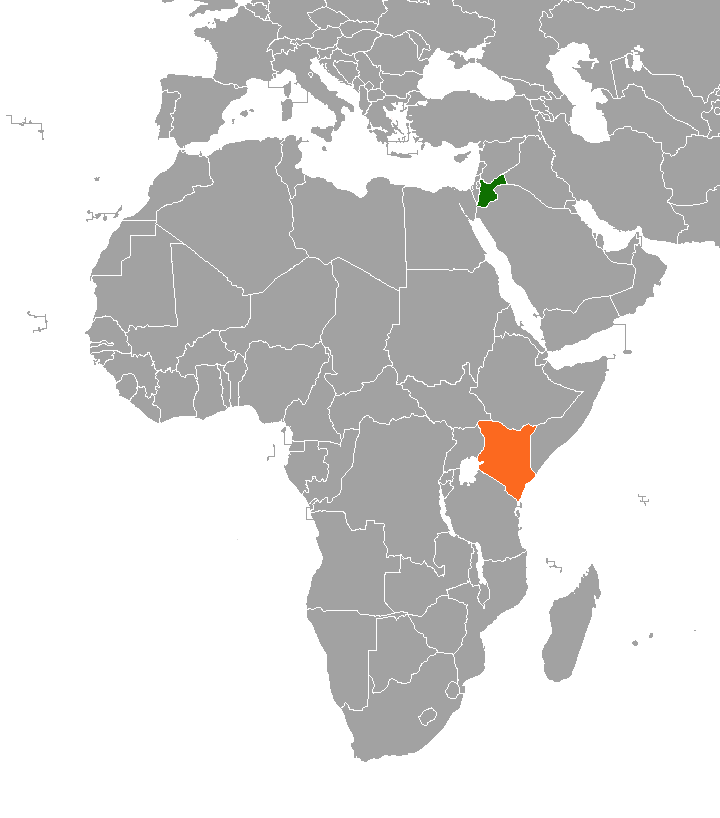

- Jordan: Kenya

Jordan–Kenya relations are bilateral relations between Jordan and Kenya.

== History ==
In November 2014, during his visit to the UAE, Uhuru Kenyatta the President of Kenya discussed ways with King Abdullah II of Jordan to combat extremism and asked for Jordan's expertise in the matter. Sheikh Mohammed Bin Rashid Al Maktoum, who is the Vice President of the UAE and Ruler of Dubai was present. Kenyatta also visited Aqqaba, Jordan, where he attended a summit featuring various other international leaders. He also discussed the same bilateral issues therein.

== Trade ==
Jordan expressed its openness to trade with various African countries, including Kenya.

Kenya is considered the third largest non Arab African market in the continent and an important business gateway to the African Great Lakes region by Jordan. It is also one of the major nontraditional markets and important to access the wider COMESA market.

Trade between Jordan and Kenya included:

(All currency is in US$ )

Year	Imports (to Kenya from Jordan)	Import Growth Rate%	Exports (to Jordan from Kenya)	Exports Growth Rate%	Trade Balance Kenyan Economy
2004	11,025,138	394	681,408	-46	-10,343,730
2005	1,254,670	-89	1,785,721	162	531,051
2006	8,557,265	582	1,477,112	-17	-7,080,153
2007	10,341,797	21	1,862,369	26	-8,479,428
2008	5,430,886	-47	2,096,436	13	-3,334,450
2009	6,953,415	28	2,859,621	36	-4,093,794

Kenya imports goods that mostly consist of inorganic chemicals, fertilisers, pharmaceuticals, plastics products, furniture, dates and air conditioning machines.

Jordan imports goods that mostly consist of coffee, jute and other textiles, sugar confectionery and cut flowers and buds.

== Diplomatic missions ==
The embassy of Kenya in Cairo accredited to Jordan.
