= Yerliyya =

Yerli
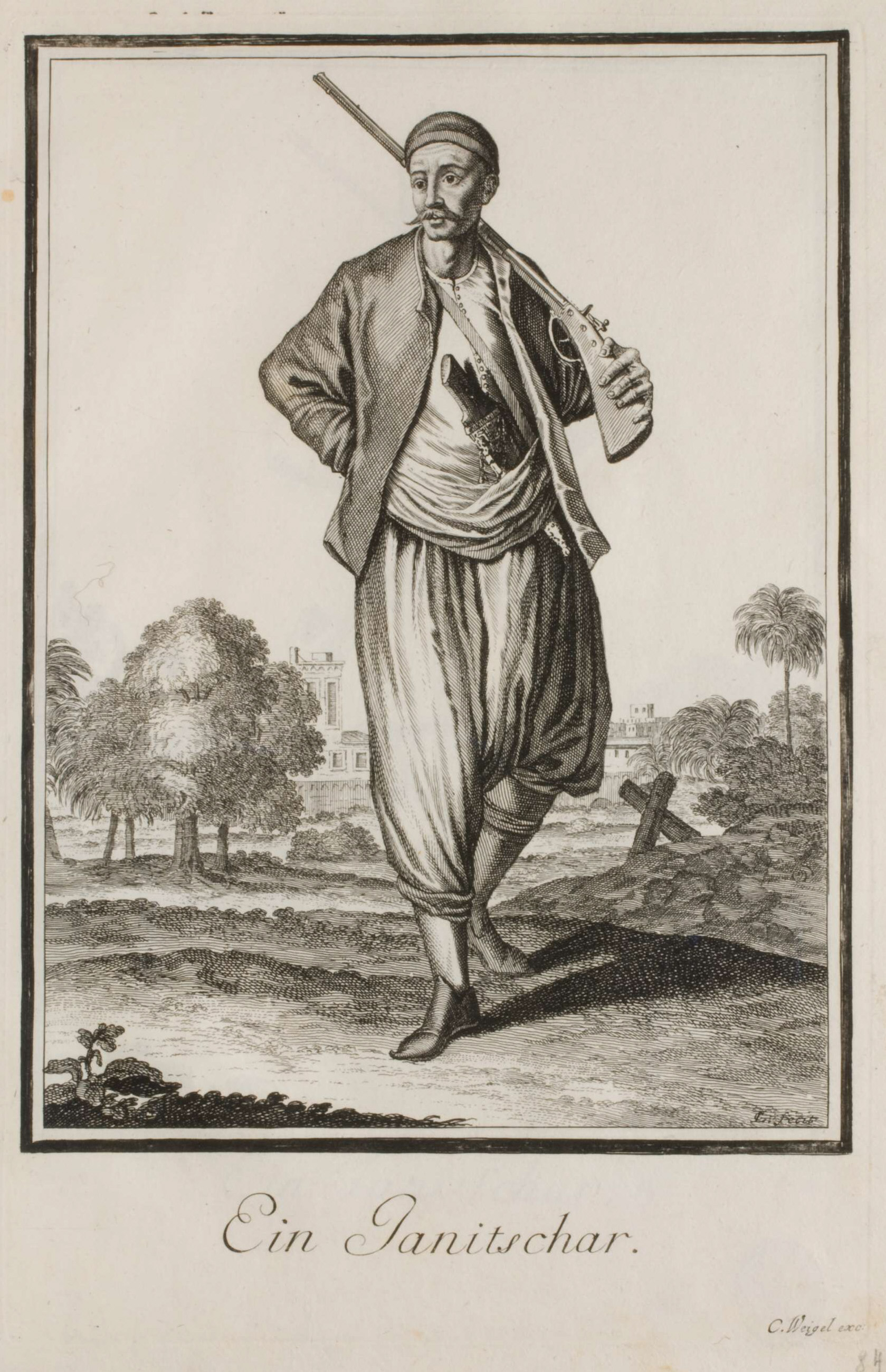
- Active: 17th–19th century
- Allegiance: Ottoman Empire
- Type: Auxiliary
- Part of: Janissaries

Yerliye or Yerli (Turkish: yerliler, Arabic: Yerliyya, from Turkish: yerlü, meaning "local") was a term used in the Ottoman Empire, initially, in the 17th century for local services such as building bridges, while since the mid-17th century it came to be applied to the Janissaries corps. In the 18th century, the local provincial military recruits were also called yerli kulu. Another name for local Janissaries (Turkish: yerli yeniçeri) was Yamaks, auxiliaries, many of whom carried out the Janissary military duties.

In the Middle East, there was a formal distinction between Yerli Janissaries (local militia) and the Imperial Janissaries (kapıkulu, of the central government). These two Janissary groups conflicted in Syria.

== Sources ==
- Aksan, Virginia (2014). Ottoman Wars, 1700-1870: An Empire Besieged. Routledge. ISBN 978-1-317-88402-6.
