= Qira, Salfit =

Qira
- Municipality type D (Village council)

Arabic transcription(s)
  - Arabic: قيره
  - Latin: Qira (official)
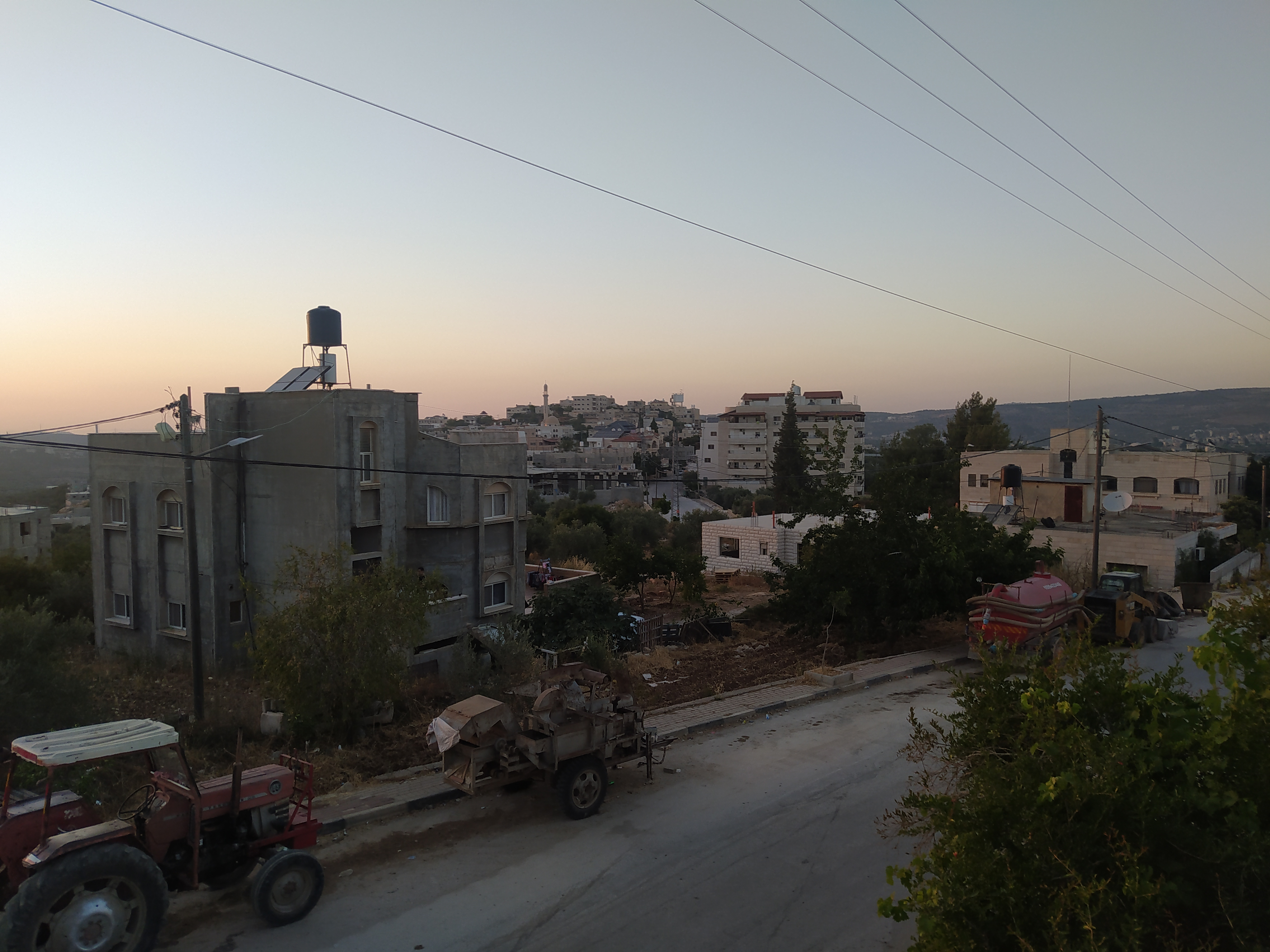

- Location of Qira within Palestine
- Coordinates: 32°07′19″N 35°10′18″E
- Palestine grid: 166/169
- State: State of Palestine
- Governorate: Salfit

Government
  - Type: Village council
- Elevation: 470 m (1,540 ft)

Population (2017)
  - Total: 1,278
- Name meaning: Pitch

Qira (Arabic: قيرة) is a Palestinian town in the Salfit Governorate in the northern West Bank, 19 kilometers southwest of Nablus. According to the Palestinian Central Bureau of Statistics, it had a population of approximately 1,278 in 2017.

== Location ==
Qira is 4.2 kilometers (2.6 mi) north of Salfit. It is bordered by Jamma'in and Marda to the east, Kifl Haris and Marda to the south, Kifl Haris to the west, and Zeita Jamma'in to the north.

== History ==
Pottery sherds from the Iron Age I – II, Persian, Hellenistic/Roman have been found here, as has sherds from the Byzantine and Crusader/Ayyubid eras. While the majority of Iron Age pottery was unearthed at the bottom of the southern and eastern slopes, a Middle Bronze Age sherd was found near a sheikh tomb to the west.

During the Crusader period, Diya' al-Din (1173–1245) writes that there was a Muslim population in the village. He also noted that followers of Ibn Qudamah lived here.

Sherds from the Mamluk era have also been found here.

=== Ottoman era ===
In 1517 the village was included in the Ottoman Empire with the rest of Palestine, and it appeared in the 1596 tax-records as Qira, located in the Nahiya of Jabal Qubal of the Liwa of Nablus. The population was 8 households and 1 bachelor, all Muslim. They paid a fixed tax rate of 33.3% on agricultural products, such as wheat, barley, summer crops, olive trees, goats and beehives and a press for olive oil or grape syrup, in addition to occasional revenues and a fixed tax for people of Nablus area; a total of 2,000 akçe. Sherds from the early Ottoman era have been found here.

In the 18th and 19th centuries the village formed part of the highland region known as Jūrat ‘Amra or Bilād Jammā‘īn. Situated between Dayr Ghassāna in the south and the present Route 5 in the north, and between Majdal Yābā in the west and Jammā‘īn, Mardā and Kifl Ḥāris in the east, this area served, according to historian Roy Marom, "as a buffer zone between the political-economic-social units of the Jerusalem and the Nablus regions. On the political level, it suffered from instability due to the migration of the Bedouin tribes and the constant competition among local clans for the right to collect taxes on behalf of the Ottoman authorities."

In 1838 Edward Robinson noted it as a village, Kireh, in the Jurat Merda district, south of Nablus.

In 1870 Victor Guérin noted Kireh on a hill partly covered with olives, and having "barely a hundred and forty inhabitants".

In 1870/1871 (1288 AH) an Ottoman census listed the village in the nahiya (sub-district) of Jamma'in al-Thani, subordinate to Nablus.

In 1882 the Palestine Exploration Fund's Survey of Western Palestine described Kireh as: "A moderate village on high ground, with a chapel venerated by the Moslems, but named after the Virgin Mary. The water supply is from a pool.

=== British Mandate era ===
In the 1922 census of Palestine conducted by the British Mandate authorities, Qireh had a population of 87 Muslims, increasing in the 1931 census to 102 Muslims in 28 occupied houses.

In the 1945 statistics the population was 140 Muslims while the total land area was 2,249 dunams, according to an official land and population survey. Of this, 475 were allocated for plantations and irrigable land, 1,145 for cereals, while 14 dunams were classified as built-up areas.

=== Jordanian era ===
In the wake of the 1948 Arab–Israeli War, and after the 1949 Armistice Agreements, Qira came under Jordanian rule.

The Jordanian census of 1961 found 259 inhabitants.

=== Post-1967 ===
Since the Six-Day War in 1967, Qira has been under Israeli occupation.

After the 1995 accords, 97.6% of village land is defined as Area B land, while the remaining 2.4% is Area C. The Segregation Wall established around Ariel settlement isolates Qira from Salfit and neighboring villages, leading Qira residents to take alternative longer routes to reach Salfit.

=== Settlers' attacks ===
Qira has been the target of violence by Israeli settlers from nearby Jewish settlements. In January 2022, Palestinian cars were vandalized in the area, with perpetrators spray-painting Stars of David on the vehicles and puncturing their tires.

== Bibliography ==
- Barron, J.B., ed. (1923). Palestine: Report and General Abstracts of the Census of 1922. Government of Palestine.
- Conder, C.R.; Kitchener, H.H. (1882). The Survey of Western Palestine: Memoirs of the Topography, Orography, Hydrography, and Archaeology. Vol. 2. London: Committee of the Palestine Exploration Fund.
- Dauphin, C. (1998). La Palestine byzantine, Peuplement et Populations. BAR International Series 726 (in French). Vol. III : Catalogue. Oxford: Archeopress. ISBN 0-860549-05-4.
- Drory, Joseph (1988). "Hanbalis of the Nablus Region in the Eleventh and Twelfth Centuries". Asian and African Studies. 22: 93–112. Archived from the original on 2018-03-01.
- Ellenblum, R. (2003). Frankish Rural Settlement in the Latin Kingdom of Jerusalem. Cambridge University Press. ISBN 9780521521871.
- Finkelstein, I.; Lederman, Zvi, eds. (1997). Highlands of many cultures. Tel Aviv: Institute of Archaeology of Tel Aviv University Publications Section. ISBN 965-440-007-3.
- Government of Jordan, Department of Statistics (1964). First Census of Population and Housing. Volume I: Final Tables; General Characteristics of the Population (PDF).
- Government of Palestine, Department of Statistics (1945). Village Statistics, April, 1945.
- Guérin, V. (1875). Description Géographique Historique et Archéologique de la Palestine (in French). Vol. 2: Samarie, pt. 2. Paris: L'Imprimerie Nationale.
- Hadawi, S. (1970). Village Statistics of 1945: A Classification of Land and Area ownership in Palestine. Palestine Liberation Organization Research Center.
- Hütteroth, W.-D.; Abdulfattah, K. (1977). Historical Geography of Palestine, Transjordan and Southern Syria in the Late 16th Century. Erlanger Geographische Arbeiten, Sonderband 5. Erlangen, Germany: Vorstand der Fränkischen Geographischen Gesellschaft. ISBN 3-920405-41-2.
- Mills, E., ed. (1932). Census of Palestine 1931. Population of Villages, Towns and Administrative Areas. Jerusalem: Government of Palestine.
- Palmer, E.H. (1881). The Survey of Western Palestine: Arabic and English Name Lists Collected During the Survey by Lieutenants Conder and Kitchener, R. E. Transliterated and Explained by E.H. Palmer. Committee of the Palestine Exploration Fund.
- Robinson, E.; Smith, E. (1841). Biblical Researches in Palestine, Mount Sinai and Arabia Petraea: A Journal of Travels in the year 1838. Vol. 3. Boston: Crocker & Brewster.
- Talmon-Heller, Daniella (2002). Riley-Smith, J. (ed.). The Cited Tales of the Wondrous Doings of the Shaykhs of the Holy Land. Vol. 1. published in Crusades. Aldershot, Hampshire: Published by Ashgate for the Society for the Study of the Crusades and the Latin East. pp. 111–154. ISBN 0754609189.
