= Adonizedek =

King of Jerusalem in the Book of Joshua

King of Jerusalem
- Reign: c. 1350 BCE

According to the Book of Joshua, Adonizedek (Hebrew: אֲדֹנִי־צֶדֶק ʾĂḏōnī-ṣeḏeq, also transliterated Adoni-zedec) was king of Jerusalem at the time of the Israelite invasion of Canaan. According to Cheyne and Black, the name originally meant "Ṣedeḳ is lord", but this would likely have been read later as meaning "lord of righteousness" or "my lord is righteous".

Adonizedek led a coalition of five of the neighboring Amorite rulers (Hoham, king of Hebron; Piram, king of Jarmuth; Japhia, king of Lachish; and Debir, king of Eglon) in resisting the invasion, but the allies were defeated at Gibeon, and suffered at Beth-horon, not only from their pursuers, but also from a great hail storm. The five allied kings took refuge in a cave at Makkedah and were imprisoned there until after the battle, when Joshua commanded that they be brought before him; whereupon they were brought out, humiliated, and put to death.

According to the Midrash, the name Adoni-zedek is translated as "Master of Zedek"—that is, "of Jerusalem", the city of righteousness.

Genesis 14:18-20 records that, some 600 years prior to Adoni-zedek, there was another ruler of Jerusalem named Melchi-zedek. It may be possible that Zedek was a dynastic name/title for the rulers of Jerusalem before David.

M. G. Easton, in the 1894 Easton's Bible Dictionary, identifies Adonizedek with a king of Jerusalem called `Abdi-Heba ("servant of Heba"), who around 1350 BC wrote several letters to the Pharaoh of Egypt. Six of his letters to the king of Egypt are included in the Amarna letters, and he is mentioned in a seventh.

== Popular culture ==
Adonizedek was portrayed by actor Mário Frias (once Jair Bolsonaro's Secretary of Culture) in the Brazilian soap opera A Terra Prometida. In it, Adonizedek is portrayed as an arrogant king later revealed to be sadistic; further, he keeps the skeletons of his mother and his wife, and talks to them.
