= Ibziq =

Khirbet Ibziq
- Village council

Arabic transcription(s)
  - Arabic: إبزيق
- Location of Salhab within Palestine
- Coordinates: 32°22′44″N 35°25′46″E
- Palestine grid: 188/197
- State: State of Palestine
- Governorate: Tubas

Government
  - Type: Village council

Area
  - Total: 800 dunams (80 ha; 200 acres)

Population (2017)
  - Total: 129
  - Density: 160/km^{2} (420/sq mi)
- Name meaning: "Kh. Ibzîk, the ruin of Ibzîk, p.n.,"

Khirbet Ibziq, Kh. Ibzîk, the ruin of Ibzîk, p.n. is the name of a village with two ruins in the West Bank, separated by one kilometer and referred to in the Manasseh Hill Country Survey as Khirbet Ibziq (Lower, al-Tahta) and Khirbet Ibziq (Upper, al-Fauqa). They are about twenty kilometers northeast of Nablus. The "Lower" site is to the northeast of the "Upper" site.

== History ==
Most scholars consider Khirbet Ibzik to have been the location of the biblical Bezek (also, Bezec) mentioned in 1 Samuel 11, although on the basis of archaeological evidence an alternate location for Bezek at Salhab has been proposed. Most scholars also think that the "Bezek" of 1 Samuel 11 is the same location as the "Bezek" of Judges 1, although others propose that the two refer to different locations.

The Lower site contains pottery from the Byzantine and Early Islamic Periods, and in the Byzantine period appears to have been coterminous with the Upper site. The Upper site, sometimes referred to simply as Khirbet Ibzik, contains a variety of pottery fragments extending from the Iron Age to the medieval period, including the Byzantine era.

In addition to the variation between Ibziq, Ibzik, and Ebziq the term Khirbet or khirbat is an Arabic term for a ruin, and is sometimes abbreviated "Kh.", spelled "hirbet" or "Khǔrbet," or left out altogether. The form Tell Ibziq also occurs.

=== Ottoman era ===
In 1882 the PEF's Survey of Western Palestine noted about Khǔrbet Ibzik that it was "evidently an ancient site, with traces of ruins, cisterns and caves, . . . There is a kubbeh in the ruins sacred to Sheikh Hazkin."

=== Israeli occupation ===
Since the Six-Day War in 1967, Khirbet Ibziq has been under Israeli occupation.

The village has 49 children of school age. The European Union provided the town with two prefabricated classrooms to cater to their needs from grades 1 to 6. The Israel Defense Forces dismantled the structures down in October 2018 and it was announced in May of the following year that Israel intended to sell off the confiscated materials at auction in June 2019. The EU recognizes that the structures are illegal under Israeli law, but defends their infraction of that local legislation in terms of what is permissible in international law. The EU was also concerned that at auction the building materials would be bought by settlers. It also stated that the Israeli measure worked out as financial damage to donors amounting to 15,320 euros, and demanded either a restitution of the materials to the beneficiaries, or compensation. Israel offered to restore the materials before auction if the EU agreed not to erect them in violation of its laws again, a proposal rejected by the EU.

On 26 March 2020, Israel confiscated building materials from the village, part of which were meant for emergency housing and a clinic for the ongoing coronavirus victims.

== Nebi Hizkin ==
Near the ruins of Khirbet Ibziq lies the holy site of a-Nebi Hizkin. The name Hizkin (or Hazkin) derives from the prophet Ezekiel, exhibiting the linguistic shift where Hebrew's "L" becomes "N" in Arabic renderings of biblical names. However, one Muslim tradition, cited by al-Suyuti, associates Hazkil with Hezekiah instead of Ezekiel.

== Gallery ==
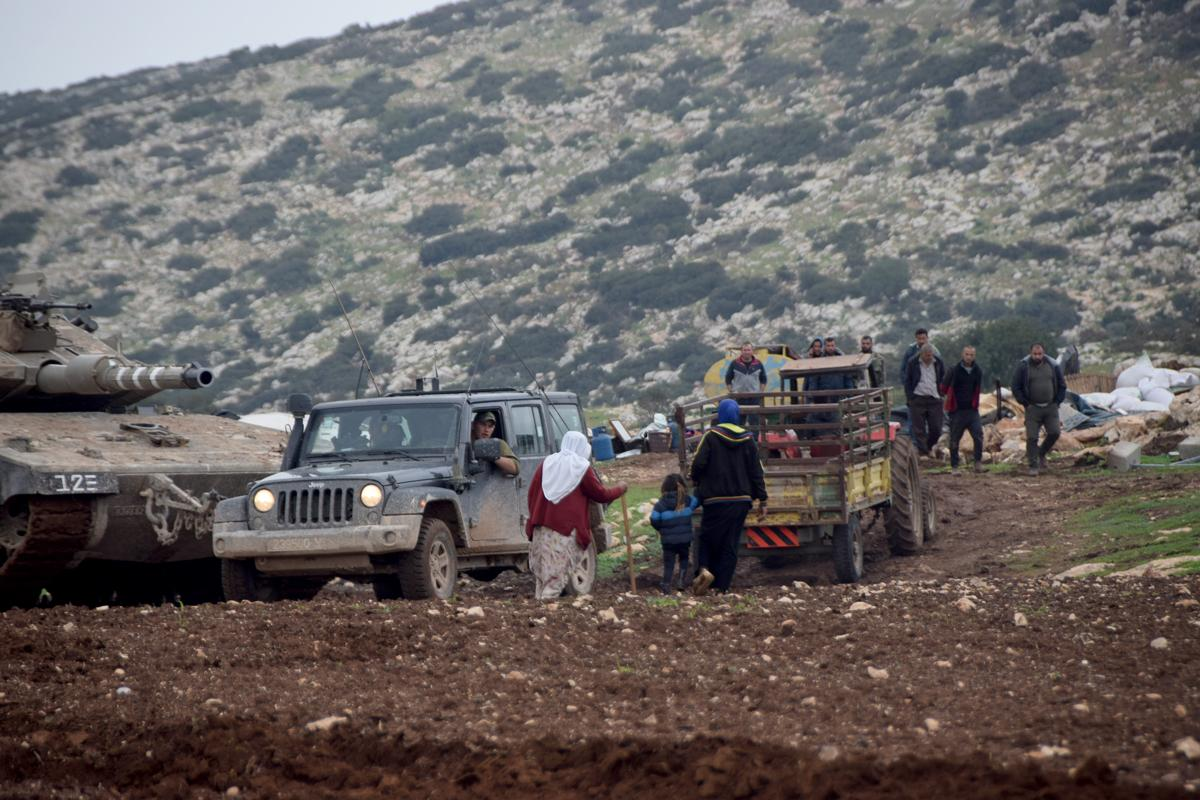
Israeli tank training in the fields of Khirbet Ibziq Palestinian village, forcing residents to leave their homes, December 2021.

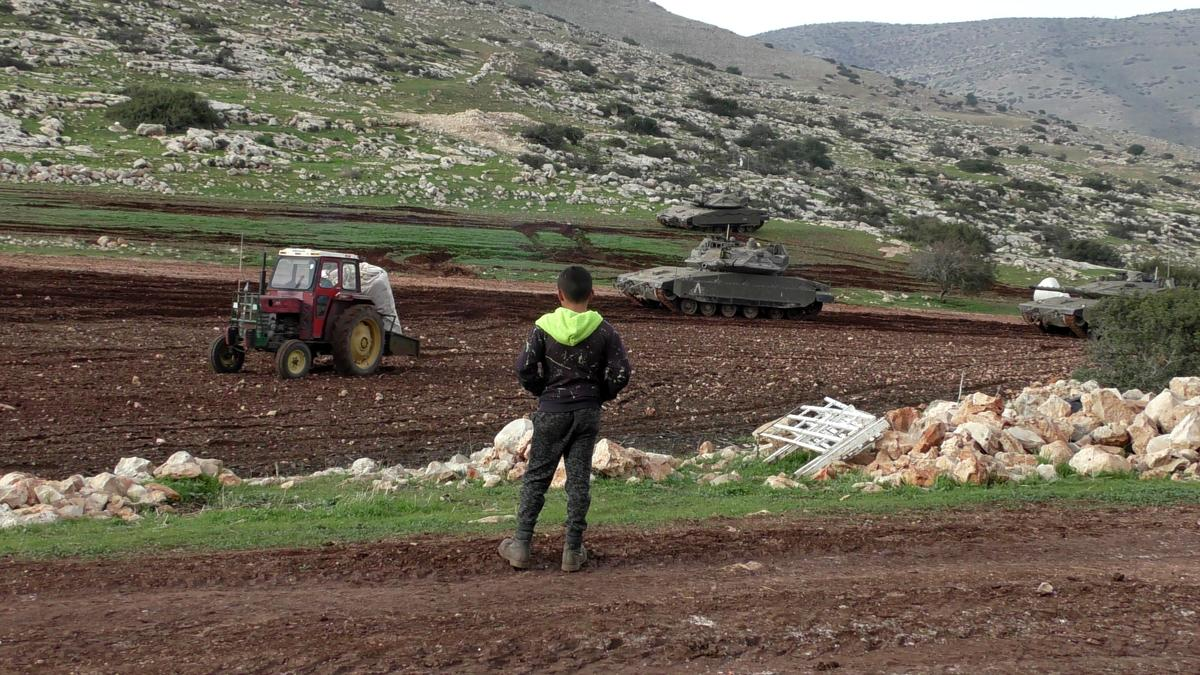
Barley crops damaged by israeli tank training, December 2021.

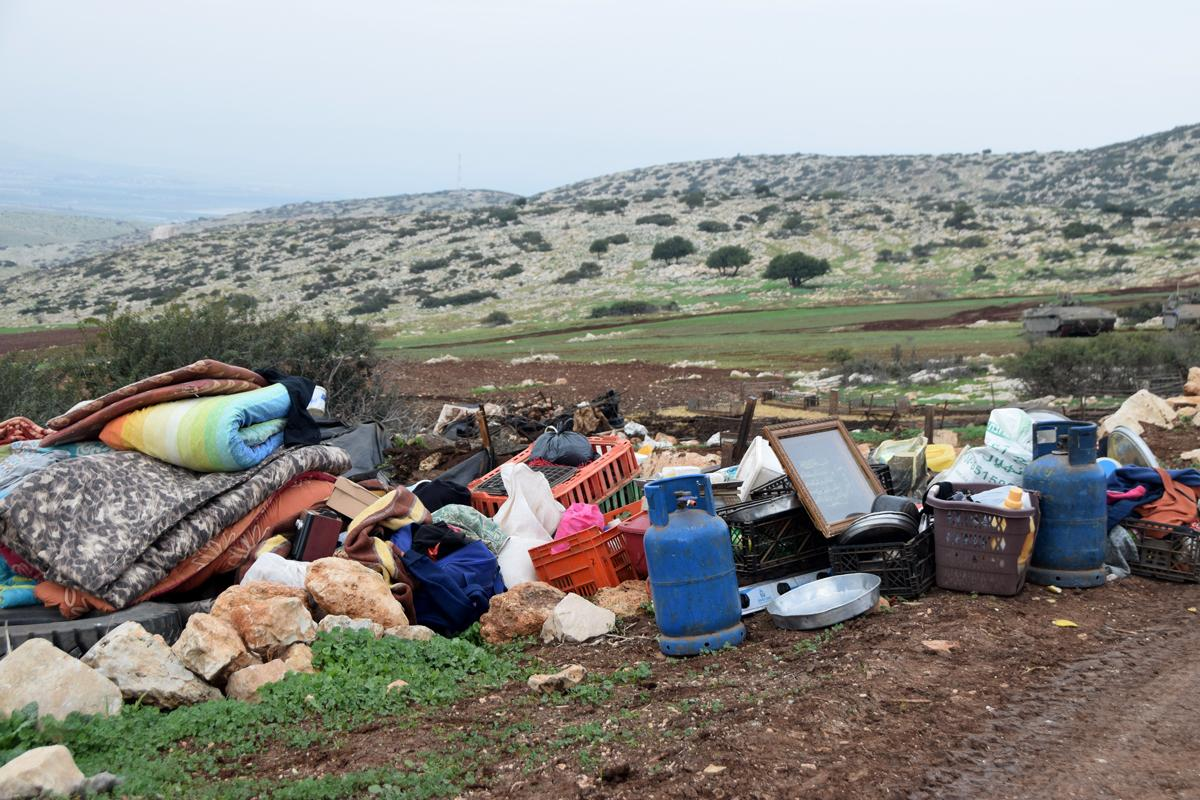
Khirbet Ibziq after residential tent confiscation by Israeli authorities, 2021.

== Bibliography ==
- Conder, C.R. (1876). "Proposed Tests for the Survey". Quarterly Statement - Palestine Exploration Fund. 8: 66–73.
- Conder, C.R. (1881). "Biblical Gains (Bezek)". Quarterly Statement - Palestine Exploration Fund. 13: 44.
- Conder, C.R.; Kitchener, H.H. (1882). The Survey of Western Palestine: Memoirs of the Topography, Orography, Hydrography, and Archaeology. Vol. 2. London: Committee of the Palestine Exploration Fund.
- Dauphin, C. (1998). La Palestine byzantine, Peuplement et Populations. BAR International Series 726 (in French). Vol. III : Catalogue. Oxford: Archeopress. ISBN 0-860549-05-4.
- Freedman, D.N.; Myers, Allen C. (31 December 2000). Eerdmans Dictionary of the Bible. Amsterdam University Press. ISBN 978-90-5356-503-2.
- Palmer, E.H. (1881). The Survey of Western Palestine: Arabic and English Name Lists Collected During the Survey by Lieutenants Conder and Kitchener, R. E. Transliterated and Explained by E.H. Palmer. Committee of the Palestine Exploration Fund.
- Sasson, J.M. (20 May 2014). Judges 1-12: A New Translation with Introduction and Commentary. Yale University Press. ISBN 978-0-300-19033-5.
- Zertal, A. (2007). The Manasseh Hill Country Survey. Vol. 2. Boston: BRILL. ISBN 978-9004163690.
