= Al-Manshiyya, Khartoum =

Neighbourhood in Sudan

Al-Manshiyya المنشية
- Neighbourhood
- Location in Sudan
- Coordinates: 15°35′36.96″N 32°34′51.24″E
- Country: Sudan
- State: Khartoum
- City: Khartoum
- Time zone: Central Africa Time, GMT + 3

Al-Manshiyya (Arabic: المنشية) is a neighbourhood located in Khartoum, the capital city of Sudan. It is situated to the east of Khartoum International Airport and is considered one of the most prestige districts in the area. Al-Manshiyya is known for being inhabited by many wealthy citizens and diplomats.
