= Rural notables (Palestine) =

Social class in Late Ottoman and British Mandate Palestine

Rural notables, as individuals, or the rural notability as a collective, was a social class of local notables (known in Arabic as a'yan-, wujaha'-, zu'ama- rifiyya, qarawiyya, mahaliyya) in Late Ottoman and British Mandate Palestine, with equivalent groups developing throughout the Levant. Most rural notables originated in, and belonged to, the fellahin/peasantry class, forming a lower-echelon land-owning gentry in Palestine's post-Tanzimat countryside and emergent towns. Numerically, rural notables form the majority of Palestinian elites, although certainly not the richest.

In contrast to the well-researched urban elites traditionally made of city-dwelling merchants (tujjar), clerics ('ulema), ashraf, military officers, and governmental functionaries, the rural notability was composed of rural sheikhs, village or clan mukhtars. Rural notables took advantage of changing legal, administrative and political conditions, and global economic realities, to achieve socio-economic and political ascendancy using households, marriage alliances and networks of patronage. They played a leading role in the development of modern Palestine into the late 20th century.
