= Raba, Jenin =

- Municipality type D (Village council)

Arabic transcription(s)
  - Arabic: رابا
- Location of Raba, Jenin within Palestine
- Coordinates: 32°23′14″N 35°22′57″E
- Palestine grid: 186/199
- State: State of Palestine
- Governorate: Jenin

Government
  - Type: Village council

Population (2017)
  - Total: 3,915
- Name meaning: from personal name

Raba (Arabic: رابا) is a Palestinian village in the Jenin Governorate.

The village was founded by the Bazur clan, originating, according to tradition, from two brothers from Awarta who fled due to a blood feud.

== History ==
Pottery sherds from the Persian (15%), Hellenistic (20%), early and late Roman (10%+5%), Byzantine (20%), early Muslim (10%) and the Middle Ages (10%) have been found here.

=== Ottoman era ===
Raba, like all of Palestine, was incorporated into the Ottoman Empire in 1517. About 10% of the pottery sherds found in the village date back to this period. In the 1596 Ottoman tax registers, it was located in the nahiya of Jabal Sami in the liwa of Nablus. Raba was listed as an entirely Muslim village with a population of 23 families. The inhabitants paid a fixed tax rate of 33,3% on agricultural products, including wheat, barley, summer crops, olive trees, and goats and/or beehives, a press for olive oil or grape syrup, in addition to occasional revenues and a tax on people from the Nablus area, a total of 3,500 akçe.

Raba was settled by people from Awarta and Qusra, probably in the 18th century.

In 1838 Rabeh was noted as a village in the Haritheh district, north of Nablus.

In 1870, Raba, situated south of Deir Abu Da'if, was one of the "not important" villages Victor Guérin noted from Faqqua.

In 1882 the PEF's Survey of Western Palestine (SWP) noted Raba as "A stone village of moderate size at the head of a valley, surrounded with scrub and having arable land to the north. The water supply appears to be artificial, cisterns existing to the north-west among the ruins."

=== British Mandate era ===
In the 1922 census of Palestine conducted by the British Mandate authorities, Raba had a population of 415, all Muslim, increasing in the 1931 census to 570, still all Muslim, in 111 houses.

In the 1945 statistics the population of Raba (including Khirbat Umm Sirhan) was 870 Muslims while the total land area was 25,642 dunams, according to an official land and population survey. Of this, 870 dunams were allocated for plantations and irrigable land, 5,833 for cereals, while 21 dunams were classified as built-up areas.

=== Jordanian era ===
In the wake of the 1948 Arab–Israeli War and the 1949 Armistice Agreements, Raba came under Jordanian rule.

The Jordanian census of 1961 found 1,143 inhabitants.

=== post-1967 ===
After the Six-Day War in 1967, Raba has been under Israeli occupation.

== Archaeology ==
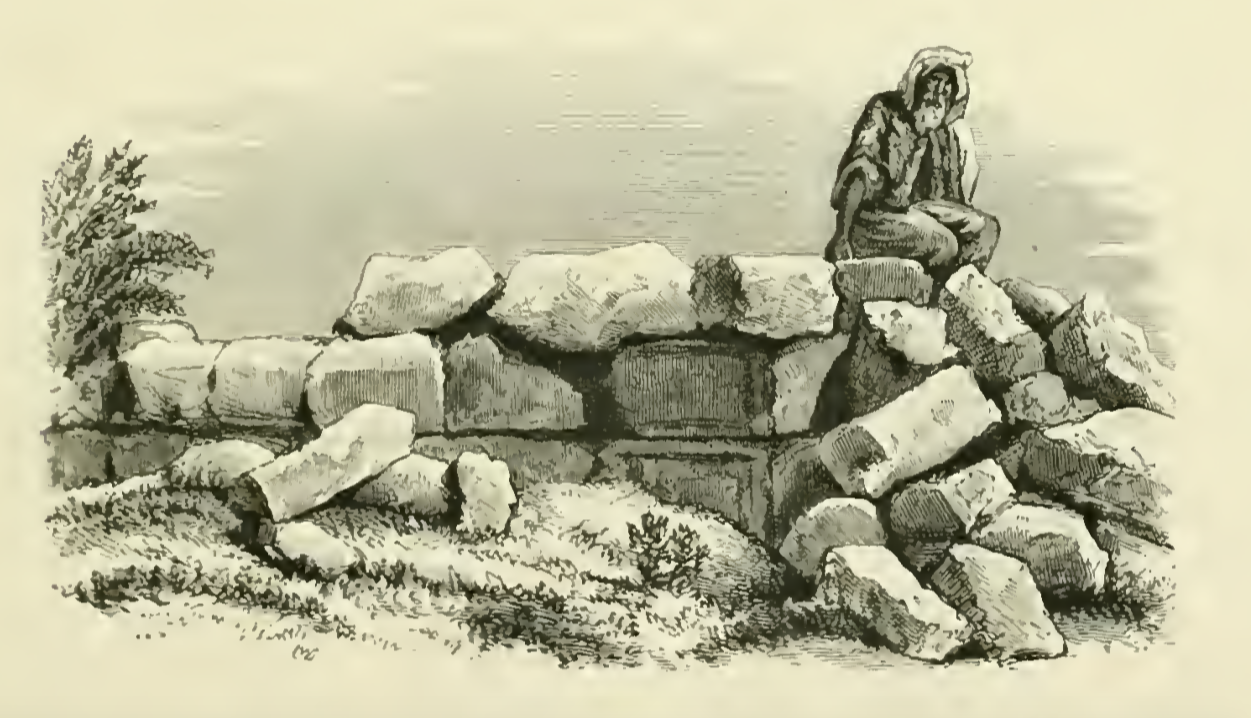
Ruins by Raba

The SWP visited in 1872 and noted: "There are ruins on every side of the modern village. On the north-east is a small ruined tower with two courses of masonry standing; the south-west angle only remains. One wall, 12 feet in extent, is directed 37°. There is a stone, which seems to have formed part of a door, lying south-east of the tower, 1 foot 6 inches thick, 2 feet 7 inches high, and about the same in width, with three recesses, as if for bars or a lock. Three shafts lie fallen near, about 2 feet diameter. A terrace or outer wall ran round the tower. No cisterns exist near. The corner-stones are drafted; one stone measured 3 feet in length, 1 foot 10 inches in height, the draft 3 1/2 inches broad, and the boss rudely dressed, projecting about the same.

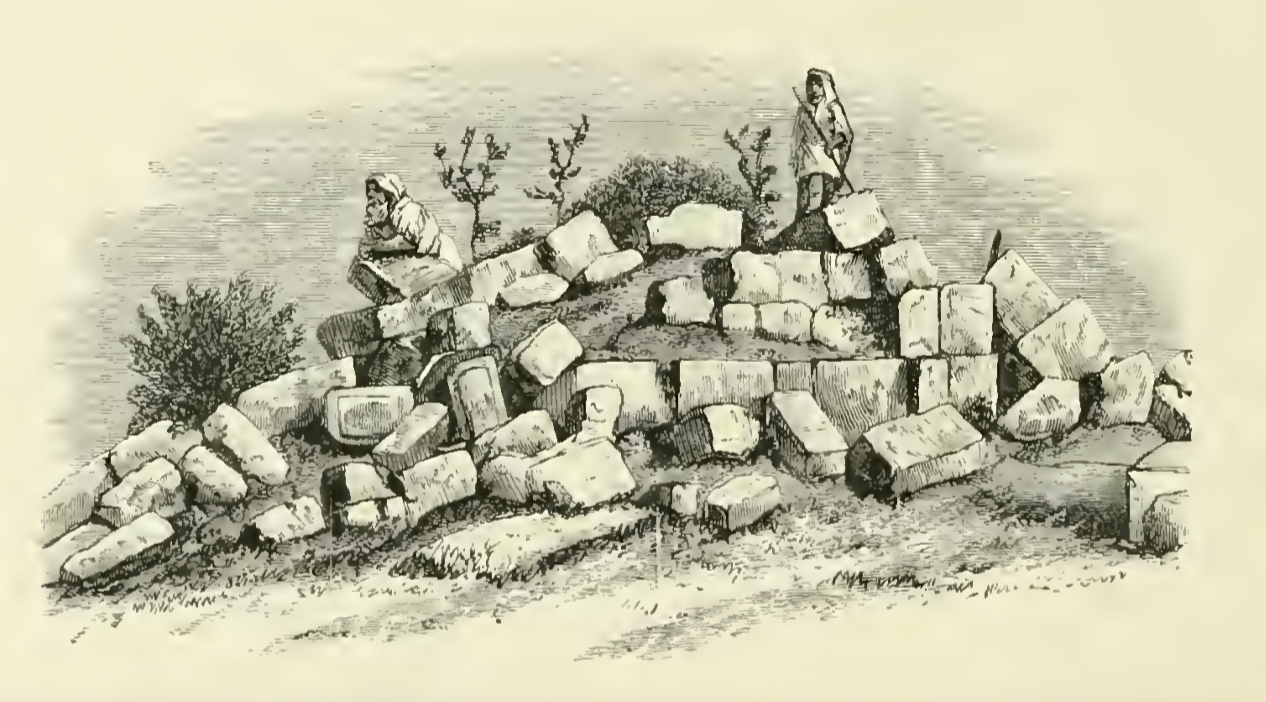
Ruins by Raba

South-west of the village is another ruin, which seems to be a chapel, but is not facing directly to the east. The foundations only remain, the length direction being 19°, and the apse at the north-east end 10 feet 4 inches diameter. The total interior length is 9 feet, plus 5 feet 2 inches the radius of the apse, or 14 feet 2 inches. The wall is 5 feet thick, of two courses of ashlar, with a core of rubble in soft white mortar. The stones in the ashlar are 2 feet long, 1 foot thick, and 1 1/2 feet in height. Several flagstones lie about. The stone is hard; the masonry is not drafted.

The third ruin is north of this chapel and west of the village. This includes a second ruined tower of larger size, called Kusr Sheikh Raba. Only one or two courses of the foundation remain, the building being 29 feet square outside, and the foundation almost solid. The bearing of one wall is 42°. The stones are large: one was found 5 feet 4 inches long, 1 foot 2 inches high. Some of the blocks are drafted with a draft 3 1/2 inches broad, the boss left rustic. Near this tower there are five rock-cut cisterns and a small cave, with other traces of ruins.

There would appear to have been a Christian site here, and the dressing of the stones suggests Crusading work."

== Folklore ==
=== Bazur clan ===
The village was founded by the Bazur clan, originating, according to tradition, from two brothers from Awarta who fled due to a blood feud and settled in Raba, which was hidden from view. The clan openly acknowledges their origins in an act of murder and blood feud, and their honor is tied to another tradition.

According to tradition, the Bazur clan's forefather was an elderly, childless man in Awarta. His family convinced a poor fellahin to marry his young daughter to the old man for a substantial sum. The marriage was agreed upon by the old man after much persuasion. The next morning, the old man, feeling weak, told his family that he believed some "bizra" (seed, i.e. semen) had left him. The family rejoiced and soon after, the old man died. The wife gave birth to a son nine months later, leading to a great celebration in the village. To commemorate this miracle, the child was named Bizra, from which the clan name Bazur derives.

== Bibliography ==
- Barron, J.B., ed. (1923). Palestine: Report and General Abstracts of the Census of 1922. Government of Palestine.
- Conder, C.R.; Kitchener, H.H. (1882). The Survey of Western Palestine: Memoirs of the Topography, Orography, Hydrography, and Archaeology. Vol. 2. London: Committee of the Palestine Exploration Fund.
- Government of Jordan, Department of Statistics (1964). First Census of Population and Housing. Volume I: Final Tables; General Characteristics of the Population (PDF).
- Government of Palestine, Department of Statistics (1945). Village Statistics, April, 1945.
- Guérin, V. (1874). Description Géographique Historique et Archéologique de la Palestine (in French). Vol. 2: Samarie, pt. 1. Paris: L'Imprimerie Nationale.
- Hadawi, S. (1970). Village Statistics of 1945: A Classification of Land and Area ownership in Palestine. Palestine Liberation Organization Research Center.
- Hütteroth, W.-D.; Abdulfattah, K. (1977). Historical Geography of Palestine, Transjordan and Southern Syria in the Late 16th Century. Erlanger Geographische Arbeiten, Sonderband 5. Erlangen, Germany: Vorstand der Fränkischen Geographischen Gesellschaft. ISBN 3-920405-41-2.
- Mills, E., ed. (1932). Census of Palestine 1931. Population of Villages, Towns and Administrative Areas. Jerusalem: Government of Palestine.
- Palmer, E.H. (1881). The Survey of Western Palestine: Arabic and English Name Lists Collected During the Survey by Lieutenants Conder and Kitchener, R. E. Transliterated and Explained by E.H. Palmer. Committee of the Palestine Exploration Fund.
- Robinson, E.; Smith, E. (1841). Biblical Researches in Palestine, Mount Sinai and Arabia Petraea: A Journal of Travels in the year 1838. Vol. 3. Boston: Crocker & Brewster.
- Zertal, A. (2007). The Manasseh Hill Country Survey. Vol. 2. Boston: BRILL. ISBN 978-9004163690.
