= Farkha =

- Municipality type D (Village council)

Arabic transcription(s)
  - Arabic: فرخة
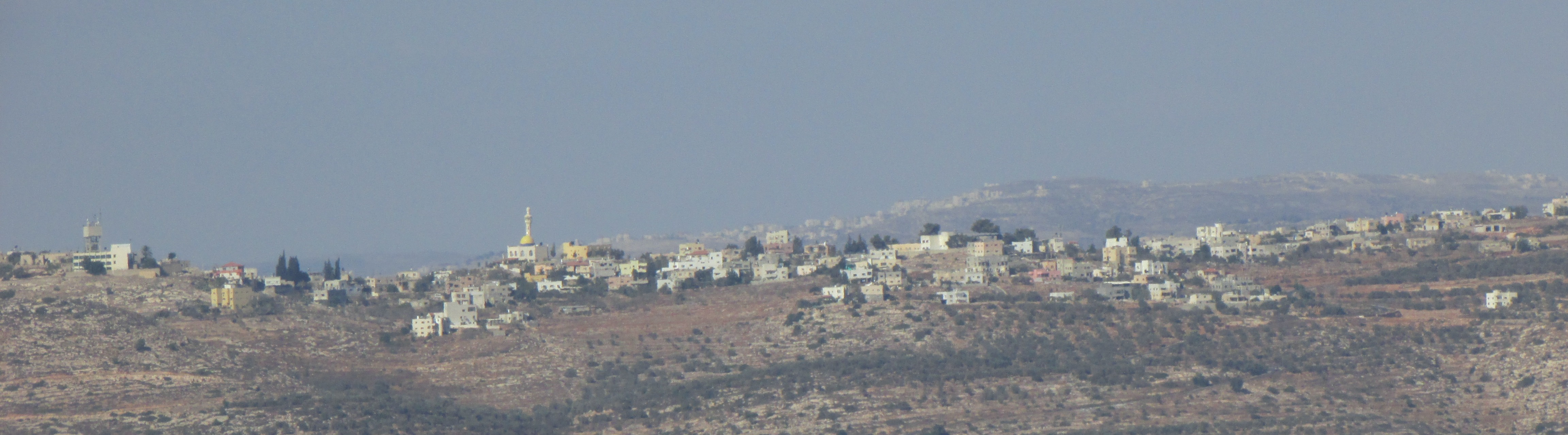
- Farkha, 2016

- Location of Farkha within Palestine
- Coordinates: 32°04′11″N 35°8′56″E
- Palestine grid: 164/164
- State: State of Palestine
- Governorate: Salfit

Government
  - Type: Village council
- Elevation: 587 m (1,926 ft)

Population (2017)
  - Total: 1,650
- Name meaning: Furkhah, from personal name

Farkha (Arabic: فرخة) is a Palestinian village in the Salfit Governorate in the northern West Bank, 30 kilometers south of Nablus. According to the Palestinian Central Bureau of Statistics, it had a population of 1,650 in 2017.

== Location ==
Farkha is located 3.2 kilometers (2.0 mi) west of Salfit. It is bordered by Salfit to the east and north, Qarawat Bani Zaid and Bani Zaid ash Sharqiya to the south, and Bruqin village to the west.

== History ==
Pottery sherds from the Middle Bronze Age, Iron Age I and IA II, Persian, Hellenistic, Roman, Byzantine and Crusader/Ayyubid have been found here.

It was populated by Samaritans up until the Arab conquest, and probably later into the Umayyad period.

An Ayyubid text in the village mosque, first noted in situ by D.C. Bamraki, dates it to 1210 CE.

Pottery sherds from the Mamluk era have also been found here. The village is seem to be the birthplace of the Muslim scholar Abdullah al-Farkhawi (d. 1415).

=== Ottoman era ===
In 1517 the village was included in the Ottoman Empire with the rest of Palestine, and in the 1596 tax-records it appeared as Farha, located in the Nahiya of Jabal Quba, part of Nablus Sanjak. The population was 17 households, all Muslim. They paid a fixed tax rate of 33.3% on agricultural products, such as wheat, barley, summer crops, olive trees, goats and beehives, in addition to occasional revenues and a fixed tax for people of Nablus area; a total of 2,800 akçe. Pottery sherds from the early Ottoman era has also been found here.

In the 18th and 19th centuries the village formed part of the highland region known as Jūrat ‘Amra or Bilād Jammā‘īn. Situated between Dayr Ghassāna in the south and the present Route 5 in the north, and between Majdal Yābā in the west and Jammā‘īn, Mardā and Kifl Ḥāris in the east, this area served, according to historian Roy Marom, "as a buffer zone between the political-economic-social units of the Jerusalem and the Nablus regions. On the political level, it suffered from instability due to the migration of the Bedouin tribes and the constant competition among local clans for the right to collect taxes on behalf of the Ottoman authorities."

In 1838 Furkha was noted as village in the Jurat Merda area, south of Nablus.

In 1870 Victor Guérin on his travels noted Farkha as a "considerable" village, located on a mountain peak.

In 1870/1871 (1288 AH) an Ottoman census listed the village with a population of 36 households in the nahiya (sub-district) of Jamma'in al-Awwal, subordinate to Nablus.

In 1882 the PEF's Survey of Western Palestine described Furkhah as: "An ancient village in a very strong position on a steep hill-top. The houses are of stone, and there are three sacred tombs, including Haram en Neby Shit, on the south. The fountain of Ain Yambua, in the valley, gives a supply of fine water, and there are two other springs east of the village. The place is evidently an ancient site. The hills around it are very steep and rocky."

=== British Mandate era ===
In the 1922 census of Palestine conducted by the British Mandate authorities, Farkha had a population of 210 Muslims, increasing in the 1931 census to 304 Muslims in 54 occupied houses.

Tawfiq Canaan mention the custom of Mafazeh at the top of the ascent of Farkah; "a traveller after climbing a high mountain raises a heap of stones, or throw a stone on an existing heap, saying at the same time prayer as a mark of thanks to God that he has overcome a difficulty."

In the 1945 statistics the population was 380 Muslims while the total land area was 5,675 dunams, according to an official land and population survey. Of this, 1,753 were allocated for plantations and irrigable land, 1,301 for cereals, while 14 dunams were classified as built-up areas.

=== Jordanian era ===
In the wake of the 1948 Arab–Israeli War and after the 1949 Armistice Agreements, Farkha came under Jordanian rule.

The Jordanian census of 1961 found 564 inhabitants.

=== Post-1967 ===
Since the Six-Day War in 1967, Farkha has been under Israeli occupation.

After the 1995 accords, Israel and Israeli settlements got 80% of the water from the Western Aquifer, leading often to severe shortages of water in Farkha.

After 1995, 48% of village land is defined as Area A land, 21.6% is Area B, while the remaining 30.4% is defined as Area C land. As of 2013, the plans for the Segregation Wall would isolate the village from much of its land behind the wall.

== Bibliography ==
- Barron, J.B., ed. (1923). Palestine: Report and General Abstracts of the Census of 1922. Government of Palestine.
- Canaan, T. (1927). Mohammedan Saints and Sanctuaries in Palestine. London: Luzac & Co.
- Conder, C.R.; Kitchener, H.H. (1882). The Survey of Western Palestine: Memoirs of the Topography, Orography, Hydrography, and Archaeology. Vol. 2. London: Committee of the Palestine Exploration Fund.
- Finkelstein, I.; Lederman, Zvi, eds. (1997). Highlands of many cultures. Tel Aviv: Institute of Archaeology of Tel Aviv University Publications Section. ISBN 965-440-007-3.
- Government of Jordan, Department of Statistics (1964). First Census of Population and Housing. Volume I: Final Tables; General Characteristics of the Population (PDF).
- Government of Palestine, Department of Statistics (1945). Village Statistics, April, 1945.
- Guérin, V. (1875). Description Géographique Historique et Archéologique de la Palestine (in French). Vol. 2: Samarie, pt. 2. Paris: L'Imprimerie Nationale.
- Hadawi, S. (1970). Village Statistics of 1945: A Classification of Land and Area ownership in Palestine. Palestine Liberation Organization Research Center.
- Hütteroth, W.-D.; Abdulfattah, K. (1977). Historical Geography of Palestine, Transjordan and Southern Syria in the Late 16th Century. Erlanger Geographische Arbeiten, Sonderband 5. Erlangen, Germany: Vorstand der Fränkischen Geographischen Gesellschaft. ISBN 3-920405-41-2.
- Mills, E., ed. (1932). Census of Palestine 1931. Population of Villages, Towns and Administrative Areas. Jerusalem: Government of Palestine.
- Palmer, E.H. (1881). The Survey of Western Palestine: Arabic and English Name Lists Collected During the Survey by Lieutenants Conder and Kitchener, R. E. Transliterated and Explained by E.H. Palmer. Committee of the Palestine Exploration Fund.
- Robinson, E.; Smith, E. (1841). Biblical Researches in Palestine, Mount Sinai and Arabia Petraea: A Journal of Travels in the year 1838. Vol. 3. Boston: Crocker & Brewster.
- Sharon, M. (2004). Corpus Inscriptionum Arabicarum Palaestinae, D-F. Vol. 3. BRILL. ISBN 90-04-13197-3.
- Sharon, M. (2005). "Vassal and fasal: the evidence of the Farkhah inscription from 606/1210". Crusades. 22: 127–140.
