= Al-Manshiyya, Jenin =

al-Manshiyya
- Municipality type D (Village council)

Arabic transcription(s)
  - Arabic: المنشية
- Location of al-Manshiyya within Palestine
- Coordinates: 32°26′50″N 35°14′05″E
- Palestine grid: 172/205
- State: Palestine
- Governorate: Jenin

Government
  - Type: Village council

Population (2006)
  - Total: 156

Al-Manshiyya (Arabic: المنشية) is a village in the West Bank governorate of Jenin, Palestine. According to the Palestinian Central Bureau of Statistics, the village had a population of 156 inhabitants in mid-year 2006.
