= Al Aqrabaniya =

Municipality type C in Nablus Governorate, State of Palestine

Coordinates: 32°15′11″N 35°22′40″E

Al Aqrabaniya (Arabic: العقربانية) is a Palestinian village in the Nablus Governorate in northern West Bank, located 12.1 kilometers east of Nablus. According to the Palestinian Central Bureau of Statistics (PCBS), the village's population was 939 inhabitants in 2017. It is bordered by Furush Beit Dajan to the east, Beit Dajan and Deir al-Hatab to the south, Al-Badhan to the west, and An-Nassariya and Beit Hasan to the north. The total area of the village consists of approximately 13,574 dunums.

== History ==
Al Aqrabaniya was named after "al-aqraban" which is the name given to the male scorpion, of which there are many in the area. The village residents originally came from villages including Kafr Qallil and Salim.

Under the Oslo II Interim Agreement signed on 28 September 1995, Al Aqrabaniya was divided into two areas, namely Area B and Area C. Area B encompasses approximately 13,299 dunums, which accounts for 98% of the village's total area. In this area, the Palestinian National Authority (PNA) exercises full control over civil matters, while Israel retains ultimate responsibility for security. On the other hand, Area C, constituting 275 dunums or 2% of the total area, remains under Israel's complete control in terms of security and administrative affairs. In Area C, Palestinian construction and land management are restricted unless authorized or permitted by the Israeli Civil Administration. The majority of Al Aqrabaniya's population resides in Area B.

== Economy ==
The economy in Al Aqrabaniya depends mainly on its agricultural sector, which employed 86.5% of the village's workforce in 2013, according to the village's council.

The results of a 2013 field survey conducted by Applied Research Institute - Jerusalem (ARIJ) indicated that the agriculture sector accounted for 86.5% of the labor force, while the Israeli labor market employed 1.5% of the workforce. The public employees sector represented 10% of the labor force, followed by the trade and services sectors both at 1%.

In 2013, the unemployment rate in Al Aqrabaniya was 30%.

== Education ==
According to the PCBS, in 2007, Al Aqrabaniya had an illiteracy rate of approximately 11.8% among its population, with 69.8% of the illiterate individuals being female. Out of the total population, 20.8% could only read and write with no formal education, 31.4% had elementary education, 20.3% had preparatory education, 10.5% had secondary education, and 5.1% had completed higher education.

There is one public school in the village, which followed by UNRWA, which is run by the Palestinian Ministry of Higher Education. The village does not have a kindergarten.

== Infrastructure ==
=== Healthcare ===
Al Aqrabaniya does not have any health facilities. Patients are transferred to the governmental An-Nassariya health center or to a health center run by UNRWA in An-Nassariya, 1 km away from the village.

=== Electricity and telecommunication services ===
Al Aqrabaniya has been connected to a public electricity network since 1994 and is served by the Israeli Qatari Electricity Company. In 2013, 95% of the housing units in the village were connected to the network and 20% of the housing units within the village were connected to phone lines. The village encounters several issues related to electricity, specifically the significant distance between the electrical transformer and the village, as well as the inadequate supply of electrical power.

=== Water supply ===
Al Aqrabaniya is provided with water through the public water network established in 2009 and via wells throughout the village. In 2013, 95% of housing units were connected to the public water network. In 2012, the quantity of water supplied to the village was recorded as approximately 48,000 cubic meters.

=== Waste management ===
Al Aqrabaniya lacks a public sewerage network, leading to the use of unhygienic cesspits for wastewater disposal. Solid waste management is generally well-handled, with waste collected and disposed of in the Zahret al Finjan landfill in Jenin Governorate.
