= Dajan =

Dajan may refer to:

- Bayt Dajan, Palestinian Arab village
- Beit Dajan (disambiguation), Palestinian village
- Furush Beit Dajan, Palestinian village

== People with the given name ==
- Dajan Shehi, Albanian professional footballer
- Dajan Šimac, Croatian football defender
- Dajan Ahmet, Estonian actor and stage director of Tatar heritage
- Dajan Hashemi, Danish footballer

== See also ==
- Dejan, a given name
- Ajan (disambiguation)
