= Asira ash-Shamaliya =

- Municipality type C

Arabic transcription(s)
  - Arabic: عصيرة الشماليّة
  - Latin: Asira al-Shamaliyeh (official) 'Asira ash-Shamaliyah (unofficial)
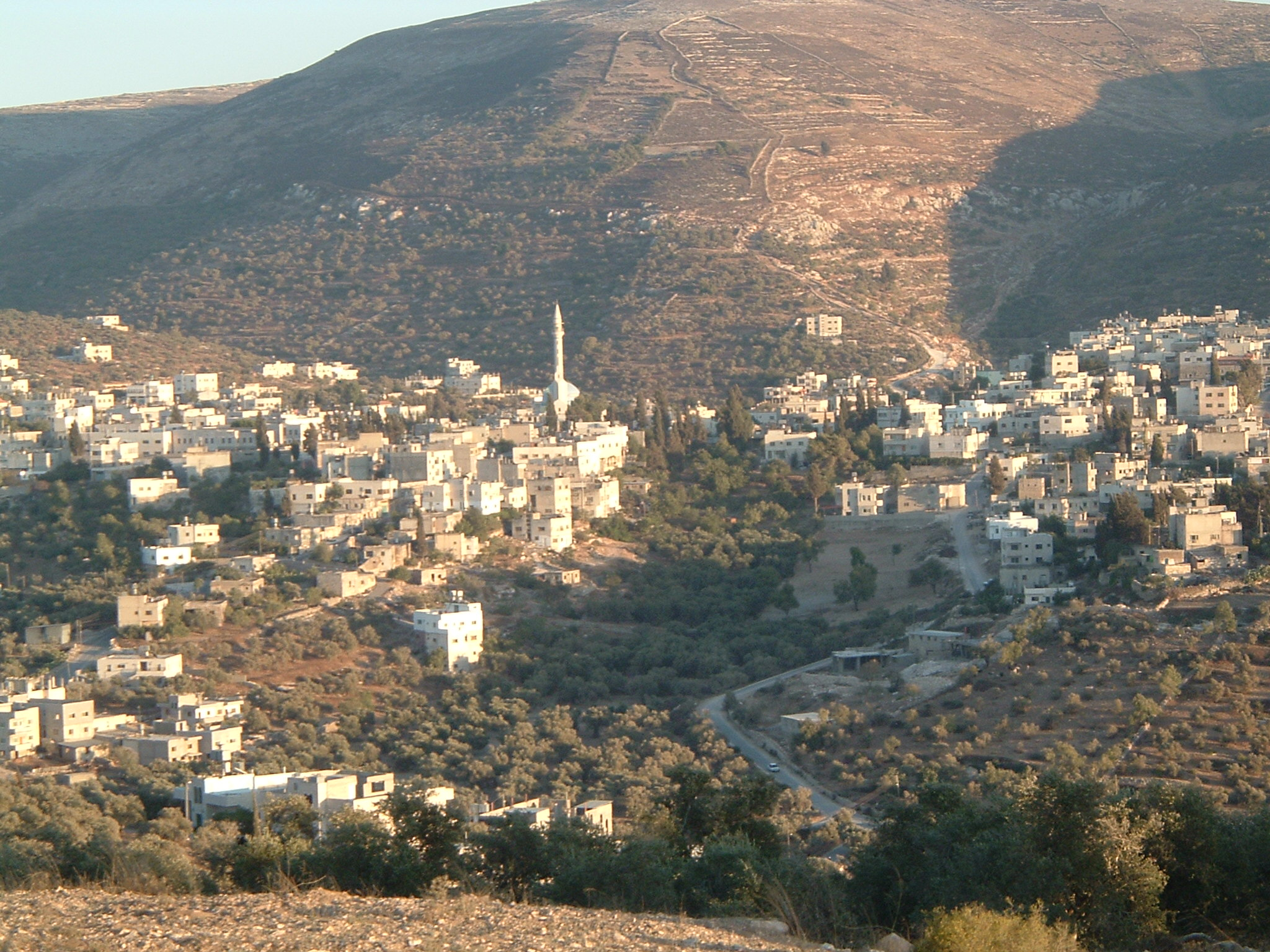
- Asira ash-Shamaliya

- Location of Asira ash-Shamaliya within Palestine
- Coordinates: 32°15′02″N 35°16′01″E
- Palestine grid: 175/184
- State: State of Palestine
- Governorate: Nablus

Government
  - Type: Municipality (from 1997)
  - Head of Municipality: Mohammad Mahmoud Jawabra

Area
  - Total: 29.4 km^{2} (11.4 sq mi)

Population (2017)
  - Total: 8,813
  - Density: 300/km^{2} (776/sq mi)
- Name meaning: "firewood of the north". Old: Asiret el Hatab, The difficult place of timber
- Website: www.asira.org.ps

Asira ash-Shamaliya (Arabic: عصيرة الشماليّة) is a Palestinian town in the Nablus Governorate, located 3.5 kilometers north of Nablus in the northern West Bank. According to the Palestinian Central Bureau of Statistics, the town had a population of approximately 8,813 inhabitants in 2017.

== Location ==
‘Asira ash Shamaliya is located 3.5 km north of Nablus. It is bordered by Talluza, Al Badhan, and 'Azmut to the east, Nablus to the south, Zawata, Ijnisinya, and Nisf Jubeil to the west, and Beit Imrin and Yasid to the north.

== Etymology ==
According to Palmer, the old name Asiret el Hatab means The difficult place of timber. According to the local municipality, in Arabic, the word Asira means "firewood" and refers to the town's (and nearby Asira al-Qibliya's) abundance of forests which was used by residents to sell firewood.

== History ==
Pottery sherds from the Iron Age I, Iron Age II, late Roman, Byzantine, early Muslim and Medieval eras have been found here.

South east of the village centre (at grid no. 175/183) is a site where a quantity of pottery from Iron Age I has been found.

In 1166, a Crusader estate called Asine was located here.

=== Ottoman era ===
In 1517, the village was included in the Ottoman Empire with the rest of Palestine, and in the 1596 tax-records it appeared as 'Asirah, located in the Nahiya of Jabal Sami, part of Nablus Sanjak. The population was 19 households and 5 bachelors, all Muslim. They paid a fixed tax rate of 33.3% on agricultural products, such as wheat, barley, summer crops, olive trees, goats and beehives, in addition to occasional revenues and a fixed tax for people of Nablus area; a total of 3,335 akçe.

In 1838 Robinson placed 'Asiret el Hatab in the Wady esh-Sha'ir district, west of Nablus.

In 1870, Victor Guérin noted about the village, which he called A'sireh, that it was: "a considerable village, whose inhabitants are considered industrious. Their houses are better built than in many other places in Palestine. Around the village, there are some gardens planted with figs, olive trees and vegetables."

In 1882, the PEF's Survey of Western Palestine (SWP) described Asira ash-Shamaliya, which they called 'Asiret el Hatab as: "a large village on a round knoll, with olive groves on every side."

=== British Mandate era ===
In the 1922 census of Palestine, conducted by the British Mandate authorities, 'Asira Shamaliyeh had a population of 1,179; 1,178 Muslims and 1 Orthodox Christian, increasing in the 1931 census to 1,544, all Muslim, in 329 houses.

In the 1945 statistics the population was 2,060, all Muslims, with 30,496 dunams of land, according to an official land and population survey. Of this, 4,850 dunams were used for plantations and irrigable land, 11,765 were for cereals, while 101 dunams were built-up (urban) land.

=== Jordanian era ===
In the wake of the 1948 Arab–Israeli War, and after the 1949 Armistice Agreements, Asira ash-Shamaliya came under Jordanian rule.

In 1961, the population of Asira Shamaliya was 3,232.

=== Post-1967 ===
Since the Six-Day War in 1967, Asira ash-Shamaliya has been under Israeli occupation. The population of 'Asira Shamaliya in the 1967 census conducted by the Israeli authorities was 3,217, of whom 53 originated from Israeli territory.

After the 1995 accords, 62% of village land was classified as Area A, 24% as Area B, and the remaining 14% as Area C.

== Possible ancient identifications ==
According to PEF Survey of Palestine (1882), Asira ash-Shamaliya could be the Aesora of Judith 4:4.

According to Zertal (2004), Asira is one of the candidates for the place Haserot, which was mentioned in the Samaria Ostraca. Another candidate for Haserot is the ruin el-Kebarrah (grid 1793/1967), located SW of Sir.

== Notable residents ==
- Ansam Sawalha
- Woroud Sawalha

== Bibliography ==
- Barron, J.B., ed. (1923). Palestine: Report and General Abstracts of the Census of 1922. Government of Palestine.
- Conder, C.R.; Kitchener, H.H. (1882). The Survey of Western Palestine: Memoirs of the Topography, Orography, Hydrography, and Archaeology. Vol. 2. London: Committee of the Palestine Exploration Fund.
- Dauphin, C. (1998). La Palestine byzantine, Peuplement et Populations. BAR International Series 726 (in French). Vol. III : Catalogue. Oxford: Archeopress. ISBN 0-86054-905-4.
- Government of Jordan, Department of Statistics (1964). First Census of Population and Housing. Volume I: Final Tables; General Characteristics of the Population (PDF).
- Government of Palestine, Department of Statistics (1945). Village Statistics, April, 1945.
- Guérin, V. (1874). Description Géographique Historique et Archéologique de la Palestine (in French). Vol. 2: Samarie, pt. 1. Paris: L'Imprimerie Nationale.
- Hadawi, S. (1970). Village Statistics of 1945: A Classification of Land and Area ownership in Palestine. Palestine Liberation Organization Research Center.
- Hütteroth, W.-D.; Abdulfattah, K. (1977). Historical Geography of Palestine, Transjordan and Southern Syria in the Late 16th Century. Erlanger Geographische Arbeiten, Sonderband 5. Erlangen, Germany: Vorstand der Fränkischen Geographischen Gesellschaft. ISBN 3-920405-41-2.
- Mills, E., ed. (1932). Census of Palestine 1931. Population of Villages, Towns and Administrative Areas. Jerusalem: Government of Palestine.
- Palmer, E.H. (1881). The Survey of Western Palestine: Arabic and English Name Lists Collected During the Survey by Lieutenants Conder and Kitchener, R. E. Transliterated and Explained by E.H. Palmer. Committee of the Palestine Exploration Fund.
- Perlmann, Joel: The 1967 Census of the West Bank and Gaza Strip: A Digitized Version. Annandale-on-Hudson, N.Y.: Levy Economics Institute of Bard College. November 2011 – February 2012. [Digitized from: Israel Central Bureau of Statistics, Census of Population and Housing, 1967 Conducted in the Areas Administered by the IDF, Vols. 1–5 (1967–70), and Census of Population and Housing: East Jerusalem, Parts 1 and 2 (1968–70).]
- Robinson, E.; Smith, E. (1841). Biblical Researches in Palestine, Mount Sinai and Arabia Petraea: A Journal of Travels in the year 1838. Vol. 3. Boston: Crocker & Brewster.
- Zertal, A. (2004). The Manasseh Hill Country Survey. Vol. 1. Boston: BRILL. ISBN 9004137564.
