= Talluza =

- Municipality type D (Village council)

Arabic transcription(s)
  - Arabic: طلوزة
  - Latin: Talozh (official); Telluzeh (unofficial)
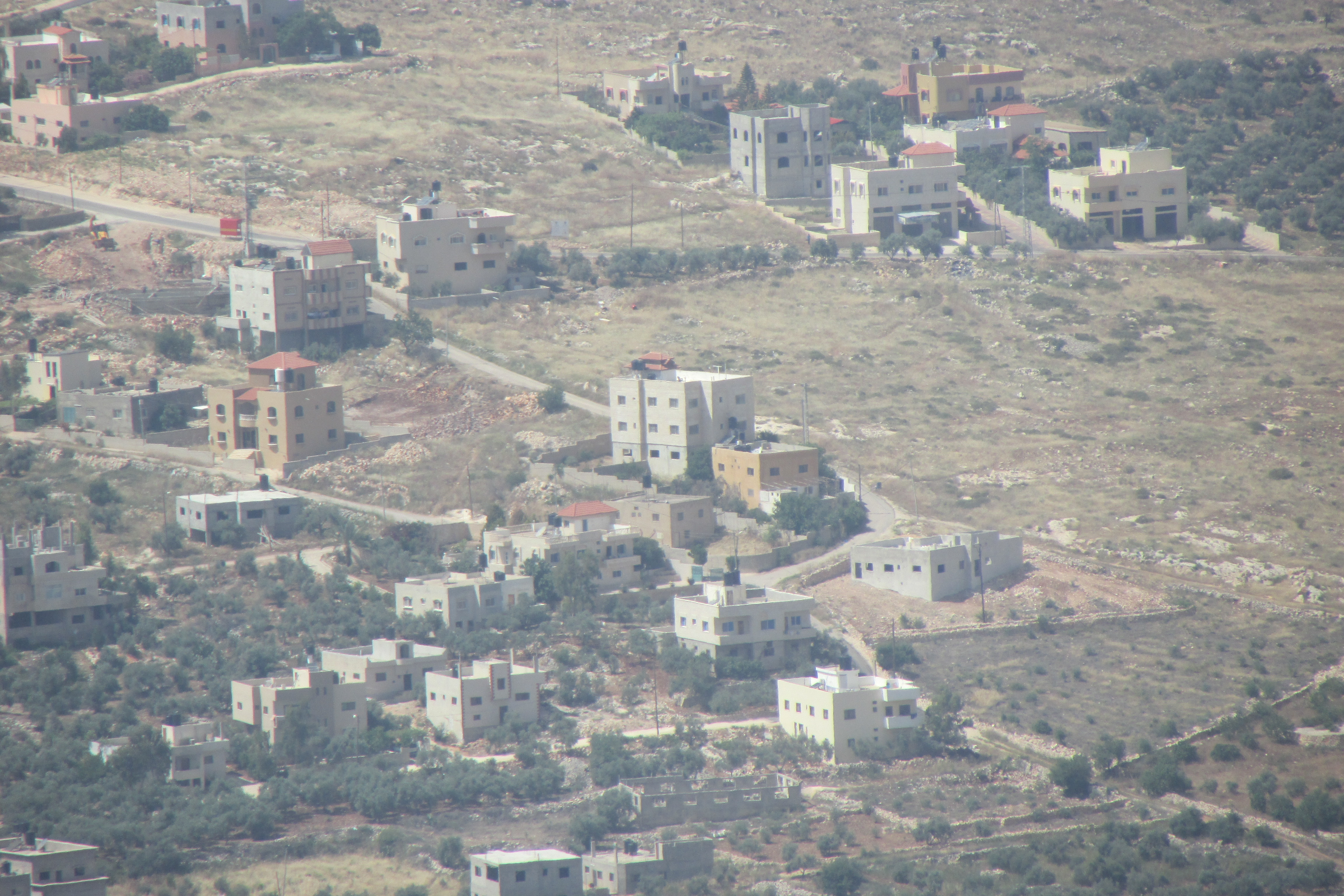
- East Talluza

- Location of Talluza within Palestine
- Coordinates: 32°16′16″N 35°17′38″E
- Palestine grid: 177/186
- State: State of Palestine
- Governorate: Nablus

Government
  - Type: Village council
  - Head of Municipality: Ahmad m . Salahat

Population (2017)
  - Total: 2,795
- Name meaning: From Aramaic: "Almond Mountain"

Talluza (Arabic: طلوزة) is a Palestinian village in the Nablus Governorate in the northern West Bank, located northeast of Nablus. According to the Palestinian Central Bureau of Statistics (PCBS) census, it had a population of 2,375 in 2007 and 2,795 in 2017.

== Location ==
Talluza is located 6.51 kilometers (4.05 mi) north of Nablus. It is bordered by al-Badhan and Wadi al Far'a to the east, Yasid to the north, and ‘Asira ash Shamaliya to the west and south.

== Etymology ==
Talluza may be identified with the Samaritan town of "Tur-Luzeh" (Tûr Lôzah), which according to Albright, is Aramaic for "almond mountain".

== History ==
Pottery sherds from the Iron Age II and the Byzantine eras have been found here.

Robinson and Guérin suggested identifying Talluza with the ancient Canaanite and Israelite city of Tirzah, however, most scholars today identify Tirzah with the site of Tell el-Far'ah (North), 5 km to the ENE.

Talluza may be identified with Tira Luzeh where the High Priest Baba Rabba erected a synagogue in the 4th century CE. The Jerusalem Talmud mentions the village as "Turluzeh" where the Romans burnt the sacred Hebrew scrolls. In 1941, a Greek inscription was found bearing the name of "Yosef Ben Ya'akov Zechariah", a Samaritan from the 4th–5th centuries. Later, in 1985 a rock-hewn Samaritan burial cave containing three coffins for members of the Samaritan Ptolemayos family was excavated. A handful of glass beads and an oil lamp were also found in the excavation.

A columbarium and Byzantine-period ceramics have been found in the village. Pottery remains have also been found from the early Islamic and medieval periods. Inside the village is the maqam ("holy tomb") of Nabi Harun ("the Prophet Aaron") according to local tradition. North of the village is the shrine of Nabi Yahuda, consisting of relatively new buildings constructed on ancient foundations, that may be derived from the biblical name Ishud.

In 1322, the village was mentioned by Sir John Maundeville under the name of Deluze.

=== Ottoman era ===
In 1596, it appeared in Ottoman tax registers as "Talluza", a village in the nahiya of Jabal Sami in the liwa of Nablus. It had a population of 62 households, all Muslim. The villagers paid a fixed tax rate of 33.3% on various agricultural products, such as wheat, barley, summer crops, olive trees, goats, and beehives, in addition to "occasional revenues" and a press for olives or grapes; a total of 9,902 akçe.

In 1838, Edward Robinson classified Talluza as being in the Haritheh district, north of Nablus. In 1852, he visited Talluza, noting "The town is of some size, and tolerably well-built. We saw no remains of antiquity, except for a few sepulchral excavations and some cisterns." Robinson further remarked the house of the village's sheikh was "built round a small court in which cattle and horses were stabled."

When Guérin visited Talluza in 1870, he described it as being a large village with 1,000–1,200 inhabitants. He also noted that many of the houses were partially destroyed, and that there were ancient cisterns there. The PEF's Survey of Western Palestine found in 1882 Talluza to be "A good-sized village, well-built, with a central Sheik's house. It stands on a knoll, with a very steep descent on the east, and the sides of the hill are covered with beautiful groves of olives....The women of the village go down to the fine springs on the east, about a mile distant, where there is a perennial supply of good water." Following the 1908 Young Turk Revolution, clan-based clashes between the inhabitants of Talluza and neighboring Asira ash-Shamaliya broke out in the wake of lax security in the area in the immediate aftermath of the revolution. Two to three men were killed in the fighting which began after Talluza's residents raided and seized Asira's cattle.

=== British Mandate era ===
In the 1922 census of Palestine conducted by the British Mandate authorities, Talluza had an entirely Muslim population of 1,116, increasing in the 1931 census when Talluza (including the villages of Wadi al-Badhan and Wadi al-Far'a) had a population of 1,376, still all Muslim, in a total of 323 houses.

In the 1945 statistics, the population was 1,830, all Muslims, while the total land area was 57,710 dunams, according to an official land and population survey. Of this, 16 dunams were allocated for citrus and bananas, 7,462 for plantations and irrigable land, 32,116 for cereals, while 41 dunams were classified as built-up areas.

=== Jordanian era ===
In the wake of the 1948 Arab–Israeli War, and after the 1949 Armistice Agreements, Talluza came under Jordanian rule. In 1961, Talluza had a population of 1,667.

Historically Talluza is linked to the village of Wadi al-Far'a since the latter village's lands were previously owned by the residents of Talluza, who used it for agricultural purposes. In the 1960s residents from Talluza settled in Wadi al-Far'a and established a separate village.

=== 1967-present ===
After the Six-Day War in 1967, Talluza has been under Israeli occupation. Under the interim Oslo Peace Accords, areas of the West Bank, which Israel occupied in the 1967 Mideast war, were divided into various categories. According to ARIJ, 99% of the village land is in Area A, where the Palestinian National Authority (PNA) holds responsibility for internal security and public order, the remainder 1% of land being in Area B.

In 1996 Wadi al-Far'a was officially separated from Talluza and was granted its own village council under the administration of the Tubas Governorate.

== Geography ==
Situated on the northern part of Mount Ebal along the slope of a plateau, Talluza has an average elevation of 545 meters (1,788 ft) above sea level. Its ancient village center is small and surrounded by relatively newer building structures. There are 50 cisterns in the village and the nearest source of water is 2.5 kilometers (1.6 mi) away from the village at Ein al-Beida. Talluza is located off the road connecting Nablus with Asira ash-Shamaliya, and nearby localities the latter to the southwest, Yasid to the northwest, Far'a Camp to the northeast and Ein al-Beida to the southeast.

== Demographics ==
In the 1997 census by the Palestinian Central Bureau of Statistics (PCBS), its population was 2,002. Refugees accounted for at least 13.8% of the inhabitants. In the 2007 census, the population increased to 2,375 living in 429 households. The average household had between 5 and 6 members. The gender distribution was 50.8% male and 49.2% female.

The main families of the village are al-Hashaykeh (which includes al-Fares, al-Awaysah, al-Balateyyeh, al-Badawi, al-Abu Shehadeh), al-Darawsheh, al-dababseh, al-Shanableh, as-Salahat, al-Janajreh and al-Barahmeh. Talluza contains three mosques and two separate secondary schools for boys and girls.

== Bibliography ==
- Barron, J.B., ed. (1923). Palestine: Report and General Abstracts of the Census of 1922. Government of Palestine.
- Conder, C.R.; Kitchener, H.H. (1882). The Survey of Western Palestine: Memoirs of the Topography, Orography, Hydrography, and Archaeology. Vol. 2. London: Committee of the Palestine Exploration Fund.
- Crown, Alan David (1989). The Samaritans. Mohr Siebeck. ISBN 3161452372.
- Dauphin, C. (1998). La Palestine byzantine, Peuplement et Populations. BAR International Series 726 (in French). Vol. III : Catalogue. Oxford: Archeopress. ISBN 0-860549-05-4.
- Government of Jordan, Department of Statistics (1964). First Census of Population and Housing. Volume I: Final Tables; General Characteristics of the Population (PDF).
- Government of Palestine, Department of Statistics (1945). Village Statistics, April, 1945.
- Guérin, V. (1874). Description Géographique Historique et Archéologique de la Palestine (in French). Vol. 2: Samarie, pt. 1. Paris: L'Imprimerie Nationale.
- Hadawi, S. (1970). Village Statistics of 1945: A Classification of Land and Area ownership in Palestine. Palestine Liberation Organization Research Center.
- Hütteroth, W.-D.; Abdulfattah, K. (1977). Historical Geography of Palestine, Transjordan and Southern Syria in the Late 16th Century. Erlanger Geographische Arbeiten, Sonderband 5. Erlangen, Germany: Vorstand der Fränkischen Geographischen Gesellschaft. ISBN 3-920405-41-2.
- Macalister, R.A.S. (1921). A History of Civilization in Palestine. The University Press.
- Mills, E., ed. (1932). Census of Palestine 1931. Population of Villages, Towns and Administrative Areas. Jerusalem: Government of Palestine.
- Robinson, E.; Smith, E. (1841). Biblical Researches in Palestine, Mount Sinai and Arabia Petraea: A Journal of Travels in the year 1838. Vol. 3. Boston: Crocker & Brewster.
- Robinson, E.; Smith, E. (1856). Later Biblical Researches in Palestine and adjacent regions: A Journal of Travels in the year 1852. London: John Murray.
- Zertal, A. (2004). The Manasseh Hill Country Survey. Vol. 1. Boston: BRILL. ISBN 9004137564.
