= Tirzah (Tell el-Farah North) =

Ancient city in Samaria, also mentioned in the Bible

Tirzah/Tell el-Far'ah (North)
- תרצה/תל אל-פארעה (Hebrew)
- Location within State of Palestine
- 32.287387°N 35.337803°E
- Periods: Bronze Age, Iron Age
- Location: Nablus Governorate, Palestinian Territories

Site notes
- Area: 180 dunam 0.18 km²
- Excavation dates: 1928, 1946–1960
- Archaeologists: Dorothy Garrod; Roland de Vaux

Tirzah (Hebrew: תִּרְצָה) was an ancient town in the Samarian highlands northeast of Shechem; it is generally identified with the site of Tell el-Far'ah (North), northeast of the modern city of Nablus, West Bank, in the immediate vicinity of the Palestinian village of Wadi al-Far'a.

== History ==
The size of the archaeological site is 180 dunams (44 acres) and is located in the hills of Samaria, northeast of Nablus, in what is currently known as the West Bank. The archaeological site is called Tell el-Far'ah (North) in order to distinguish it from Tell el-Far'ah (South), an archaeological site south of Gaza.

Excavations were undertaken at Tell el-Far'ah between 1946 and 1960 for nine seasons by École Biblique under the direction of Roland de Vaux. More recently, an international archaeological project led by the Universidade da Coruña, in cooperation with the Palestinian Ministry of Tourism and Antiquities and the Universidade Nova de Lisboa, has carried out three excavation seasons between 2017 and 2019 and one prospecting campaign in 2022.

=== Prehistoric period ===
The site was occupied in the Neolithic and Chalcolithic eras, and became progressively more populated.

==== Pre-Pottery Neolithic B ====
Period I: Finds from the earliest levels of settlement excavated by Dorothy Garrod in 1928 were suggested to date to the Pre-Pottery Neolithic B (PPNB) period.

==== Chalcolithic ====
Period II: Cave U: dwellings then tomb.

=== Early Bronze ===
During the Early Bronze Age, Tell el-Far'ah had ramparts and domestic housing units. The earliest pottery oven of its kind was excavated here; it had two chambers that allowed separation between the vessels being fired and the open flame. This type of pottery oven continued to be used in the region until the Roman period. A temple and an olive press were also uncovered. Town planning is clearly evident at the site. The western gate in the town wall was rebuilt several times during this period. The excavations indicate developing urbanization and the presence of new populations. However, the town was abandoned in the middle of the third millennium BCE, and remained so for approximately 600 years.

==== Early Bronze I ====
Period III: Pit dwellings, burials.

At the end of the EB I into the EB II society changes from being village-based to urban-based. The late EB I represented a period of settlement peak and intensified activity in the Wadi Far'ah and highlands of Samaria with settlements being newly established.

==== Early Bronze II ====
As hamlets and villages grew into fortified towns, sites like Tell el-Far'ah North had continuity in occupation throughout the EB I/II transition (c. 3000 BCE).

In the Early Bronze II (c. 3000-2750 BCE), the settlement developed. Period IV: fortifications, city gate, dwellings, potter’s kiln.

==== Early Bronze III ====
In the Early Bronze III (c. 2750-2350 BCE), there was a settlement hiatus.

==== Early Bronze IV ====
In the Early Bronze IV (c. 2350-2020 BCE), there was a settlement hiatus.

=== Middle Bronze ===
==== Middle Bronze I ====
In the Middle Bronze I (c. 2020-1820 BCE), there is a settlement hiatus.

==== Middle Bronze II ====
Period V: In the Middle Bronze Age II (c. 1820-1630 BCE), there was a small settlement on the site that used the remnants of the older town walls for protection. In the 1600s the population expanded and a new wall was built, but it enclosed a smaller area than the older city.

In Middle Bronze IIA (c. 1820-1630 BCE), there were burials only.

In Middle Bronze IIB (c. 1630-1590 BCE), there was a village and burials.

In Middle Bronze IIC (c. 1590-1550 BCE), there were fortifications, city gate, cultic installations (underground chamber, massebah?). This phase coincides with the Hyksos period in the south.

=== Late Bronze ===
The Late Bronze Age remains indicate that there was no major urban development during this period. The entire region was part of the Egyptian Empire, and during the Amarna period a local king was seated at nearby Shechem.

==== Late Bronze II ====
Period VI: In Late Bronze II there is a settlement hiatus with no town plan, some tombs.

=== Iron Age ===
==== Iron Age I ====
Period VII: Tell el-Far'ah was an important town in the early Iron Age, the center of a network of villages, one of five such networks that make up the Israelite highland settlement between Jerusalem and the Jezreel Valley beginning around 1150/1130 BCE. Excavations from the Iron Age levels have produced numerous artifacts, including various figurines, arrowheads, spindle whorls, a model sanctuary, and Four room houses. The figurines include cow heads, cows nursing calves, horses, tambourine players, and figurines that may represent either Astarte or Asherah.

==== Iron Age IIA ====
Stratum VIIb is dated by radiocarbon tests to the first half of the 10th century BCE. Excavations from this settlement phase have uncovered residential quarters and streets, public structures like a shrine, Cypriote Black-on-Red vessels, glyptic items and one of the largest ceramic assemblages from among the sites of the Kingdom of Israel during this time. It apparently served as a seat of the early kings of Israel.

== The Bible ==
=== Book of Joshua ===
The town of Tirzah is first mentioned in the Bible in the Book of Joshua, as having had a king whom the Israelites defeated. It is not mentioned again until after the period of the United Monarchy.

=== Book of Kings ===
During the time of King Jeroboam, Tirzah is mentioned as the place where Abijah, son of Jeroboam, died as a result of illness. Later Tirzah is described as a capital of the northern kingdom of Israel during the reigns of Baasha, Elah, Zimri and Omri. The royal palace at Tirzah was set on fire by Zimri when he was faced with having to surrender to Omri. Omri reigned from Tirzah for six years after which he moved Israel's capital to Samaria.

Tirzah is mentioned in when Menahem left it to Samaria, assassinated King Shallum and became King of Israel.

Tirzah is mentioned in Song of Songs, where the lover compares his beloved's beauty to that of Tirzah. If the authorship of Song of Songs can be attributed to Solomon, then this is a reference to the city during the United Monarchy. However, Song of Songs provides no definite historical context to allow it to be dated on that basis.

== Modern location ==
Robinson suggested that Talluza might be ancient Tirzah (Latin form: Thersa), one of 31 Canaanite cities which the Bible lists as having been conquered by Joshua; the modern Arabic name being a derivation of the ancient name by way of its Hebrew form, or possibly its original Canaanite form, whereby the r sound was replaced with a l. French explorer Victor Guérin also argued that Talluza was the site of ancient Thirza. Biblical researchers, Robinson and Guérin, suggested identifying the town with Talluza.

Later, Conder and Kitchener suggested that Tayasir was a more likely candidate based on its phonemes; however, today Tell el-Farah (North), northeast of modern Nablus is generally accepted as the site of Tirzah.

== Bibliography ==
- Conder, C.R.; Kitchener, H.H. (1882). The Survey of Western Palestine: Memoirs of the Topography, Orography, Hydrography, and Archaeology. Vol. 2. London: Committee of the Palestine Exploration Fund.
- Guérin, V. (1874). Description Géographique Historique et Archéologique de la Palestine (in French). Vol. 2: Samarie, pt. 1. Paris: L'Imprimerie Nationale.
- Robinson, E.; Smith, E. (1856). Later Biblical Researches in Palestine and adjacent regions: A Journal of Travels in the year 1852. London: John Murray.
