= Yasid =

- Municipality type D (Village council)

Arabic transcription(s)
  - Arabic: ياصيد
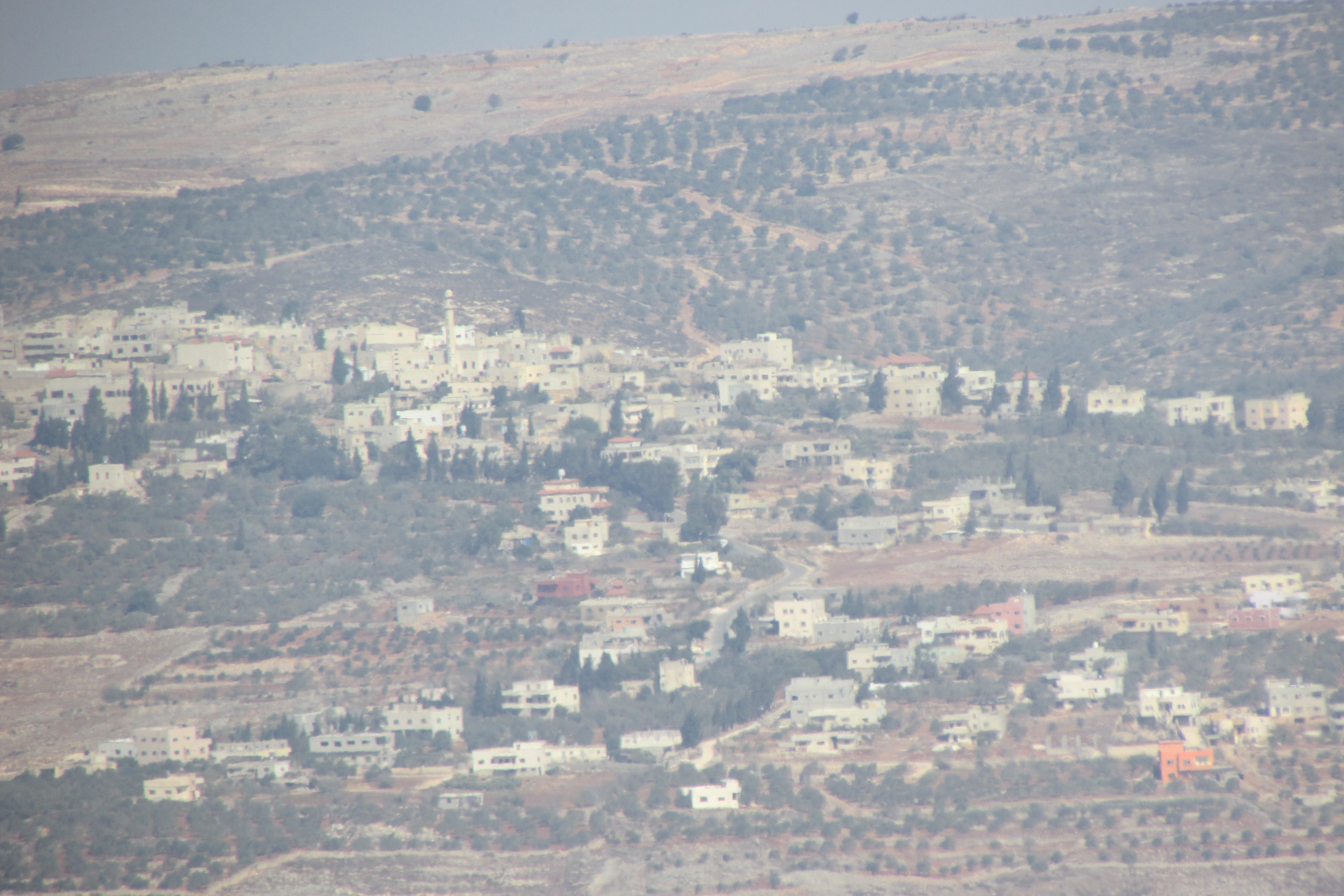
- Yasid

- Location of Yasid within Palestine
- Coordinates: 32°17′48″N 35°16′40″E
- Palestine grid: 176/189
- State: State of Palestine
- Governorate: Nablus

Government
  - Type: Village council

Population (2017)
  - Total: 2,505
- Name meaning: from personal name

Yasid (Arabic: ياصيد) is a Palestinian town in the Nablus Governorate in northern West Bank, located 15 kilometers northeast of Nablus. According to the Palestinian Central Bureau of Statistics (PCBS), the town had a population of 2,291 inhabitants in mid-year 2006 and 2,505 by 2017.

== Location ==
Yasid is located 8.6 km north of Nablus. It is bordered by Wadi al Far’a to the east, the village of Siris to the north, Beit Imrin and Jaba’ to the west, and Talluza and ‘Asira ash Shamaliya villages to the south.

== History ==
Sherds from Iron Age (I-II) Persian early and late Roman, Byzantine, Early Islamic and Medieval periods have been found here.

Yasid was identified with Yaṣat or Yaset (Hebrew: יצת), mentioned in the 9th–8th century BCE Samaria Ostraca (No. 9,-10, 19 and 47) and later in the 6th-7th century Mosaic of Reḥob as a Jewish village in the region of Sebastia which was inhabited mostly by non-Jews and, therefore, agricultural produce obtained from the area could be taken by Jews without the normal restrictions imposed during the Sabbatical years, or the need for tithing.

=== Ottoman era ===
Yasid, like the rest of Palestine, was incorporated into the Ottoman Empire in 1517, and in the census of 1596 it was a part of the nahiya ("subdistrict") of Jabal Sami which was under the administration of the liwa ("district") of Nablus. The village had a population of 47 households and 2 bachelors, all Muslim. The villagers paid taxes on wheat, barley, summer crops, olive trees, beehives and/or goats, in addition to occasional revenues and a tax on Muslims in the Nablus area; a total of 7,340 akçe.

In 1838, Yasid was located in the Haritheh District, north of Nablus.

In 1882, in the PEF's Survey of Western Palestine (SWP), Yasid was described as "A village of moderate size on a knoll, with a few trees."

=== British Mandate era ===
In the 1922 census of Palestine conducted by the British Mandate authorities, Yasid had a population of 308 Muslims, increasing in the 1931 census to 372; 369 Muslims and 3 Christians, in 67 houses.

In the 1945 statistics, Yasid had a population of 480 Muslims while the total land area was 9,222 dunams, according to an official land and population survey. Of this, 860 dunams were used for plantations and irrigable land, 4,040 for cereals, while 43 dunams were classified as built-up areas.

=== Jordanian era ===
In the wake of the 1948 Arab–Israeli War, and after the 1949 Armistice Agreements, Yasid came under Jordanian rule.

In 1961 the population was 714.

=== Post 1967 ===
Since the Six-Day War in 1967, Yasid has been under Israeli occupation, and the same year the population was recorded as 816.

After the 1995 accords all of the land in Yasid is classified as Area A land.

== Demography ==
=== Local origins ===
The residents of Yasid have their origins in Shefa-Amr. Several families live in Yasid, such as the Thaher family, descending from Zahir al-Umar, the king of Galilee in the 18th century AD. This family owns castles and ancient historical buildings dating back hundreds of years. In addition, there is the Mashaqi family, which resides in the eastern part of the town.

== Bibliography ==
- Barron, J.B., ed. (1923). Palestine: Report and General Abstracts of the Census of 1922. Government of Palestine.
- Conder, C.R.; Kitchener, H.H. (1882). The Survey of Western Palestine: Memoirs of the Topography, Orography, Hydrography, and Archaeology. Vol. 2. London: Committee of the Palestine Exploration Fund.
- Dauphin, C. (1998). La Palestine byzantine, Peuplement et Populations. BAR International Series 726 (in French). Vol. III : Catalogue. Oxford: Archeopress. ISBN 0-860549-05-4.
- Government of Jordan, Department of Statistics (1964). First Census of Population and Housing. Volume I: Final Tables; General Characteristics of the Population (PDF).
- Government of Palestine, Department of Statistics (1945). Village Statistics, April, 1945.
- Hadawi, S. (1970). Village Statistics of 1945: A Classification of Land and Area ownership in Palestine. Palestine Liberation Organization Research Center.
- Hütteroth, W.-D.; Abdulfattah, K. (1977). Historical Geography of Palestine, Transjordan and Southern Syria in the Late 16th Century. Erlanger Geographische Arbeiten, Sonderband 5. Erlangen, Germany: Vorstand der Fränkischen Geographischen Gesellschaft. ISBN 3-920405-41-2.
- Mills, E., ed. (1932). Census of Palestine 1931. Population of Villages, Towns and Administrative Areas. Jerusalem: Government of Palestine.
- Palmer, E.H. (1881). The Survey of Western Palestine: Arabic and English Name Lists Collected During the Survey by Lieutenants Conder and Kitchener, R. E. Transliterated and Explained by E.H. Palmer. Committee of the Palestine Exploration Fund.
- Perlmann, Joel: The 1967 Census of the West Bank and Gaza Strip: A Digitized Version. Annandale-on-Hudson, N.Y.: Levy Economics Institute of Bard College. November 2011 – February 2012. [Digitized from: Israel Central Bureau of Statistics, Census of Population and Housing, 1967 Conducted in the Areas Administered by the IDF, Vols. 1–5 (1967–70), and Census of Population and Housing: East Jerusalem, Parts 1 and 2 (1968–70).]
- Robinson, E.; Smith, E. (1841). Biblical Researches in Palestine, Mount Sinai and Arabia Petraea: A Journal of Travels in the year 1838. Vol. 3. Boston: Crocker & Brewster.
- Zertal, A. (2004). The Manasseh Hill Country Survey. Vol. 1. Boston: BRILL. ISBN 9004137564.
