= Beit Dajan =

Beit Dajan may refer to:

- Beit Dajan, Nablus, a Palestinian village in the Nablus Governorate
- Furush Beit Dajan, a Palestinian village in the Nablus Governorate
- Bayt Dajan, a Palestinian village near Jaffa, depopulated in 1948
- Beit Dagan, a town in Israel near Tel Aviv
- Beth Dagon, the name of two biblical cities
