= Beit Dajan, Nablus =

Beit Dajan
- Municipality type D (Village council)

Arabic transcription(s)
  - Arabic: بيت دجن
  - Latin: Bayt Dajan (unofficial)
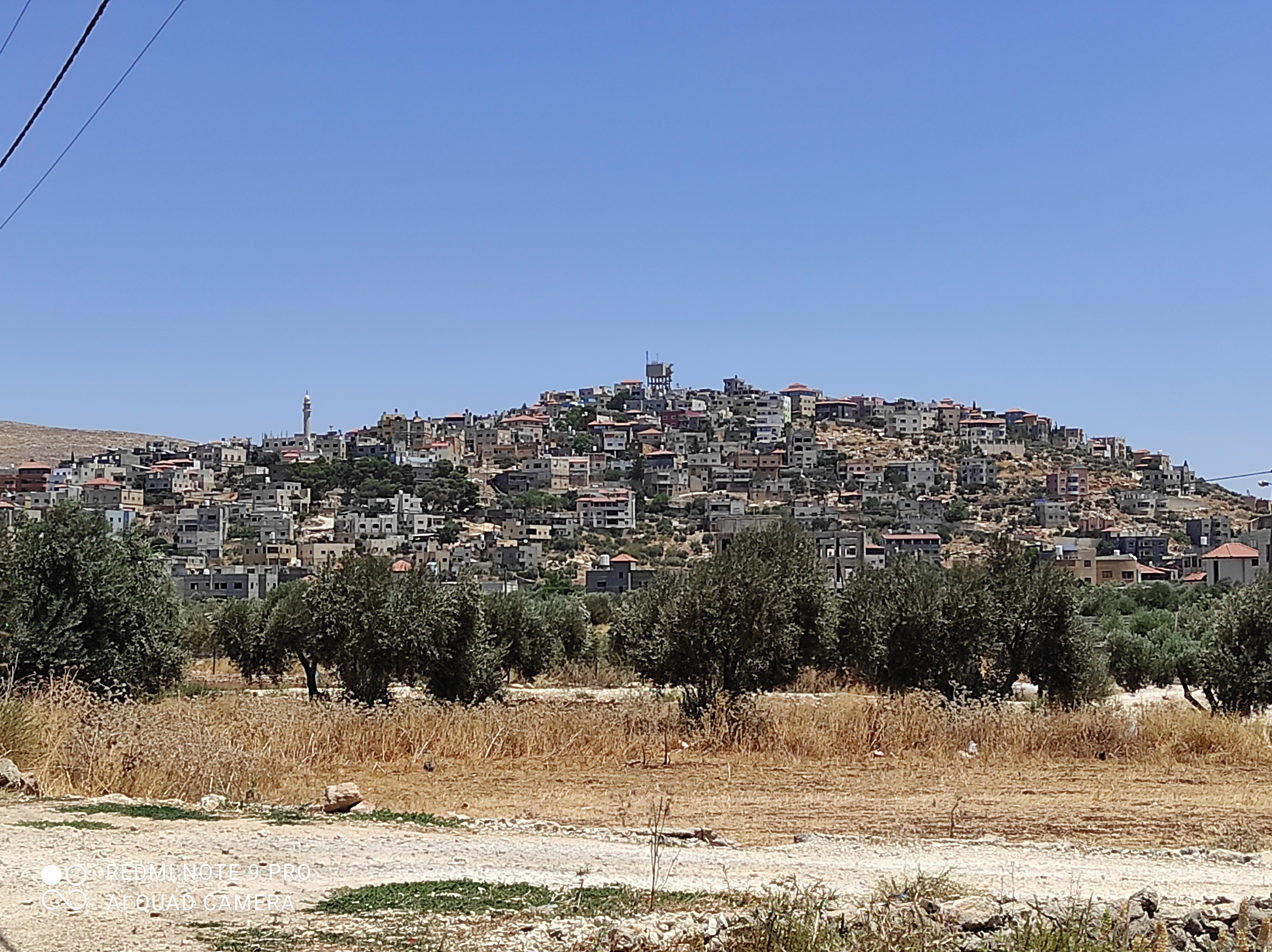
- Beit Dajan, from Beit Furik

- Location of Beit Dajan within the West Bank Location of Beit Dajan within Palestine
- Coordinates: 32°11′32″N 35°22′16″E
- Palestine grid: 185/177
- State: Palestine
- Governorate: Nablus

Government
  - Type: Village council
  - Head of Municipality: Nasr Khalil Abu Jeish

Population (2017)
  - Total: 4,460
- Name meaning: The house of Dagon
- Website: www.beitdajan.org.ps

Beit Dajan (Arabic: بيت دجن) is a Palestinian village in the Nablus Governorate in the north central West Bank, located 10 kilometers (6.2 mi) east of Nablus. According to the Palestinian Central Bureau of Statistics, it had a population of approximately 4,460 in 2017.

== Location ==
Beit Dajan is located east of Nablus. It is bordered by Furush Beit Dajan to the east, Al Aqrabaniya to the north, Deir al Hatab and Salim to the west, and Beit Furik to the south.

== History ==
Pottery sherds from Iron Age I (12-11th centuries BCE), Iron Age II, Hellenistic, Roman, Byzantine eras have been found here.

It has been suggested that this was the place named Dagon, inhabited by Samaritans in the 7th century CE.

According to Tsvi Misinai, male circumcision is performed on the seventh day of birth, following the Jewish and Samaritan traditions, rather than the Muslim custom.

Sherds from the Crusader/Ayyubid periods have also been found here.

=== Ottoman era ===
In 1517, Beit Dajan was incorporated into the Ottoman Empire with the rest of Palestine. In 1596, it appeared in Ottoman tax registers as being in the Nahiya of Jabal Qubal, part of the Sanjak of Nablus. It had a population of 53 households, all Muslim. The villagers paid a fixed tax-rate of 33,3 % on agricultural products, including wheat, barley, summer crops, olives, and goats or beehives, and for a press for olives or grapes; a total of 10,292 akçe. All of the revenue went to a waqf. Pottery sherds from the early Ottoman era have also been found here.

In 1838, Beit Dejan was noted in the El-Beitawy district, east of Nablus.

In 1850-51 it was called a "considerable" village, while in 1870, Victor Guérin found it to have 400 inhabitants. Guérin also noted a small and ancient mosque, and a number of cisterns hollowed out of rock, which still served the needs of the villagers.

In 1882, the PEF's Survey of Western Palestine described Beit Dajan as: "A small village, evidently an ancient site, with rock-cut tombs and wells to the east. It stands at the eastern end of the plain which runs below Salim. This place, like Azmut, is surrounded with olive-trees." They further noted: "The ruin on the east is a watch-tower, apparently ancient; near the village are cisterns and heaps of stones, and rock-cut tombs."

=== British Mandate era ===
In the 1922 census of Palestine conducted by the British Mandate authorities, Bait Dajan had a population of 487; all Muslims, increasing slightly in the 1931 census to 548 Muslims, in a total of 118 houses.

In the 1945 statistics, the population (including Beit Dajan Jiflik and Khirbat Furush) was 750, all Muslims, with a total of 44,076 dunams of land, according to an official land and population survey. Of this, 6 dunams were for citrus and bananas, 2,789 for plantations or irrigated land, 17,625 for cereals, while 48 dunams were built-up land.

=== Jordanian era ===
In the wake of the 1948 Arab–Israeli War Beit Dajan came under Jordanian rule.

The Jordanian census of 1961 found 926 inhabitants in Beit Dajan.

=== 1967 and aftermath ===
Since the Six-Day War in 1967, Beit Dajan came under Israeli occupation.

After the 1995 accords, 38% of the village land is defined as being in Area B, while the remaining 62% is Area C.

Israel has confiscated 199 dunams of village land for two Israeli settlements; Hamra and Mekhora.

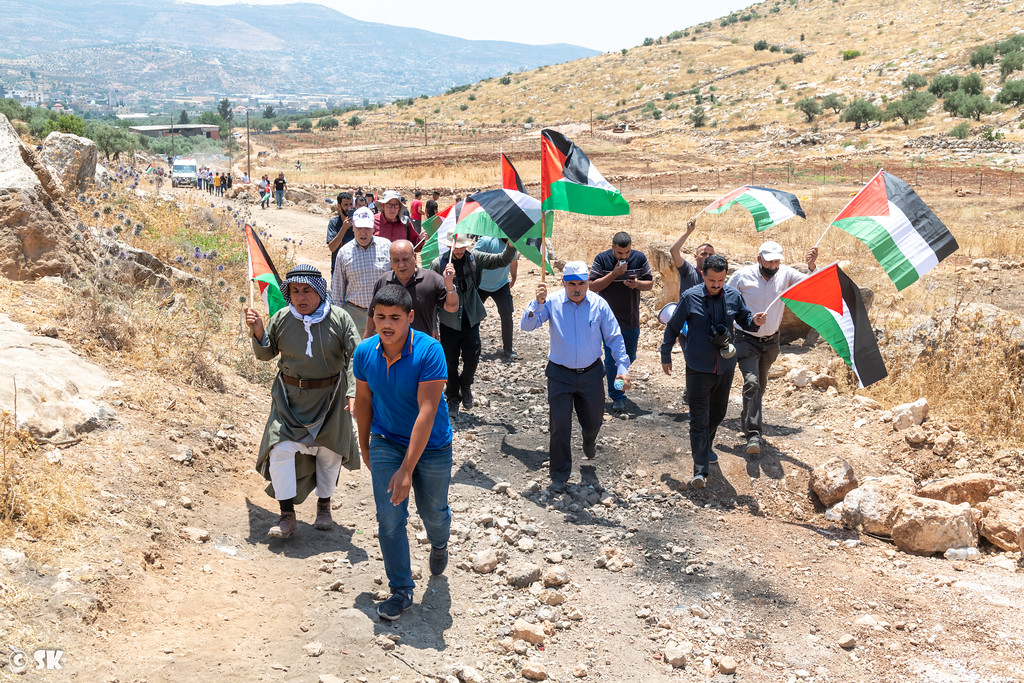
Protest against illegal settlement on Beit Dajan land, June 2022

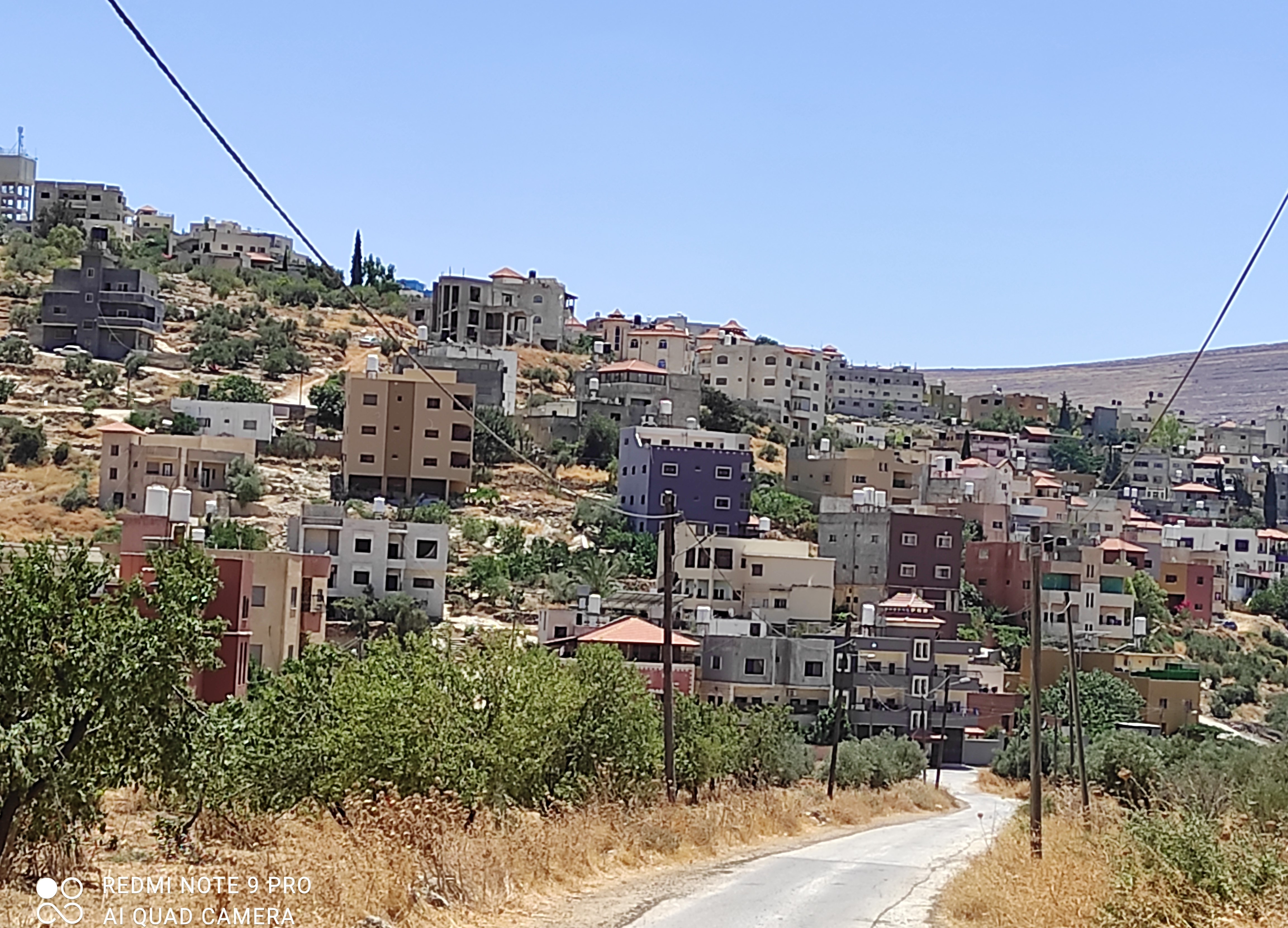
Beit Dajan view from north

In March, 2021, a local imam, Atef Hanaisheh, was shot in the head and killed by the Israeli military. The killing occurred during a protest in the village against a nearby Israeli unauthorized settler outpost.

== Demography ==
=== Local origins ===
Local accounts suggest that the majority of the population originated from Jurish, with others hailing from Hauran and Transjordan. The village was already established prior to their arrival. They used to be nomadic shepherds who roamed the fringes of the desert.

== Bibliography ==
- Barron, J.B., ed. (1923). Palestine: Report and General Abstracts of the Census of 1922. Government of Palestine.
- Conder, C.R. (1876). "Samaritan Topography". Quarterly Statement - Palestine Exploration Fund. 8 (4): 182–197. doi:10.1179/peq.1876.8.4.182.
- Conder, C.R.; Kitchener, H.H. (1882). The Survey of Western Palestine: Memoirs of the Topography, Orography, Hydrography, and Archaeology. Vol. 2. London: Committee of the Palestine Exploration Fund.
- Dauphin, C. (1998). La Palestine byzantine, Peuplement et Populations. BAR International Series 726 (in French). Vol. III : Catalogue. Oxford: Archeopress. ISBN 0-860549-05-4. (p. 847)
- Finkelstein, I.; Lederman, Zvi, eds. (1997). Highlands of many cultures. Tel Aviv: Institute of Archaeology of Tel Aviv University Publications Section. ISBN 965-440-007-3.
- Government of Jordan, Department of Statistics (1964). First Census of Population and Housing. Volume I: Final Tables; General Characteristics of the Population (PDF).
- Government of Palestine, Department of Statistics (1945). Village Statistics, April, 1945.
- Guérin, V. (1874). Description Géographique Historique et Archéologique de la Palestine (in French). Vol. 2: Samarie, pt. 1. Paris: L'Imprimerie Nationale.
- Hadawi, S. (1970). Village Statistics of 1945: A Classification of Land and Area ownership in Palestine. Palestine Liberation Organization Research Center.
- Hütteroth, W.-D.; Abdulfattah, K. (1977). Historical Geography of Palestine, Transjordan and Southern Syria in the Late 16th Century. Erlanger Geographische Arbeiten, Sonderband 5. Erlangen, Germany: Vorstand der Fränkischen Geographischen Gesellschaft. ISBN 3-920405-41-2.
- Mills, E., ed. (1932). Census of Palestine 1931. Population of Villages, Towns and Administrative Areas. Jerusalem: Government of Palestine.
- Palmer, E.H. (1881). The Survey of Western Palestine: Arabic and English Name Lists Collected During the Survey by Lieutenants Conder and Kitchener, R. E. Transliterated and Explained by E.H. Palmer. Committee of the Palestine Exploration Fund.
- Robinson, E.; Smith, E. (1841). Biblical Researches in Palestine, Mount Sinai and Arabia Petraea: A Journal of Travels in the year 1838. Vol. 3. Boston: Crocker & Brewster.
- Saulcy, L.F. de (1854). Narrative of a journey round the Dead Sea, and in the Bible lands, in 1850 and 1851. Vol. 1, new edition. London: R. Bentley.
