= Osarin =

- Municipality type D (Village council)

Arabic transcription(s)
  - Arabic: أُوصرين
  - Latin: Osarin (official) ’Usarin (unofficial)
- Location of Osarin within Palestine
- Coordinates: 32°07′32″N 35°18′37″E
- Palestine grid: 179/170
- State: State of Palestine
- Governorate: Nablus

Government
  - Type: Village council

Population (2017)
  - Total: 2,053
- Name meaning: "High ground";

Osarin (Arabic: أُوصرين) is a Palestinian town in the Nablus Governorate in northern West Bank, located 16 kilometers southeast of Nablus. According to the Palestinian Central Bureau of Statistics (PCBS), the town had a population of 2,053 inhabitants in 2017.

== Location ==
Osarin is located 11.3 kilometers (7.0 mi) south of Nablus. It is bordered by Aqraba to the east, Beita to the north and west, and Qabalan to the south.

== History ==
Shards from Iron Age II, Crusader/Ayyubid and Mamluk eras have been found here.

=== Ottoman era ===
Shards from the early Ottoman era have been found here. In 1596 the village appeared in Ottoman tax registers under the name of ‘’Usarin’’, and as being in the nahiya of Jabal Qubal in the liwa of Nablus. It had a population of 10 households and 4 bachelors, all Muslim. They paid a fixed tax-rate of 33,3 % on agricultural products, including wheat, barley, summer crops, olive trees, goats and beehives, in addition to occasional revenues and a press for olive oil or syrup; a total of 2,900 Akçe.

In 1838, Ausarin was noted as a village in the District of El-Beitawy, east of Nablus.

In 1870 Victor Guérin noted the village, situated on a hill.

=== British Mandate era ===
In the 1922 census of Palestine, conducted by the British Mandate authorities, Ausarin had a population of 87 Muslims, increasing in the 1931 census to 122 Muslim, in 34 houses.

In the 1945 statistics, Usarin had a population of 200 Muslim, with 2,185 dunams of land, according to an official land and population survey. Of this, 347 dunams were plantations and irrigable land, 1,098 were used for cereals, while 11 dunams were built-up land.

=== Jordanian era ===
In the wake of the 1948 Arab–Israeli War, and after the 1949 Armistice Agreements, Osarin came under Jordanian rule.

The Jordanian census of 1961 found 293 inhabitants in Usarin.

=== 1967-present ===
After the Six-Day War in 1967, Osarin has been under Israeli occupation.

During the early months of the First Intifada, on 23 March 1898, Adli Maher Sa'id, aged 14, was shot dead. An Israeli citizen, Ovadia Saluni from Masua, was detained as a suspect.

After the 1995 accords, 83% of the village land is defined as Area B land, while the remaining 17% is Area C.

== Bibliography ==
- Barron, J. B., ed. (1923). Palestine: Report and General Abstracts of the Census of 1922. Government of Palestine.
- Finkelstein, I.; Lederman, Zvi, eds. (1997). Highlands of many cultures. Tel Aviv: Institute of Archaeology of Tel Aviv University Publications Section. ISBN 965-440-007-3.
- Government of Jordan, Department of Statistics (1964). First Census of Population and Housing. Volume I: Final Tables; General Characteristics of the Population (PDF).
- Government of Palestine, Department of Statistics (1945). Village Statistics, April, 1945.
- Guérin, V. (1875). Description Géographique Historique et Archéologique de la Palestine (in French). Vol. 2: Samarie, pt. 2. Paris: L'Imprimerie Nationale.
- Hadawi, S. (1970). Village Statistics of 1945: A Classification of Land and Area ownership in Palestine. Palestine Liberation Organization Research Center.
- Hütteroth, W.-D.; Abdulfattah, K. (1977). Historical Geography of Palestine, Transjordan and Southern Syria in the Late 16th Century. Erlanger Geographische Arbeiten, Sonderband 5. Erlangen, Germany: Vorstand der Fränkischen Geographischen Gesellschaft. ISBN 3-920405-41-2.
- Mills, E., ed. (1932). Census of Palestine 1931. Population of Villages, Towns and Administrative Areas. Jerusalem: Government of Palestine.
- Palmer, E. H. (1881). The Survey of Western Palestine: Arabic and English Name Lists Collected During the Survey by Lieutenants Conder and Kitchener, R. E. Transliterated and Explained by E.H. Palmer. Committee of the Palestine Exploration Fund.
- Robinson, E.; Smith, E. (1841). Biblical Researches in Palestine, Mount Sinai and Arabia Petraea: A Journal of Travels in the year 1838. Vol. 3. Boston: Crocker & Brewster.
