= Hamra (Israeli settlement) =

Israeli settlement in the West Bank

Hamra: חמרה (Hebrew)
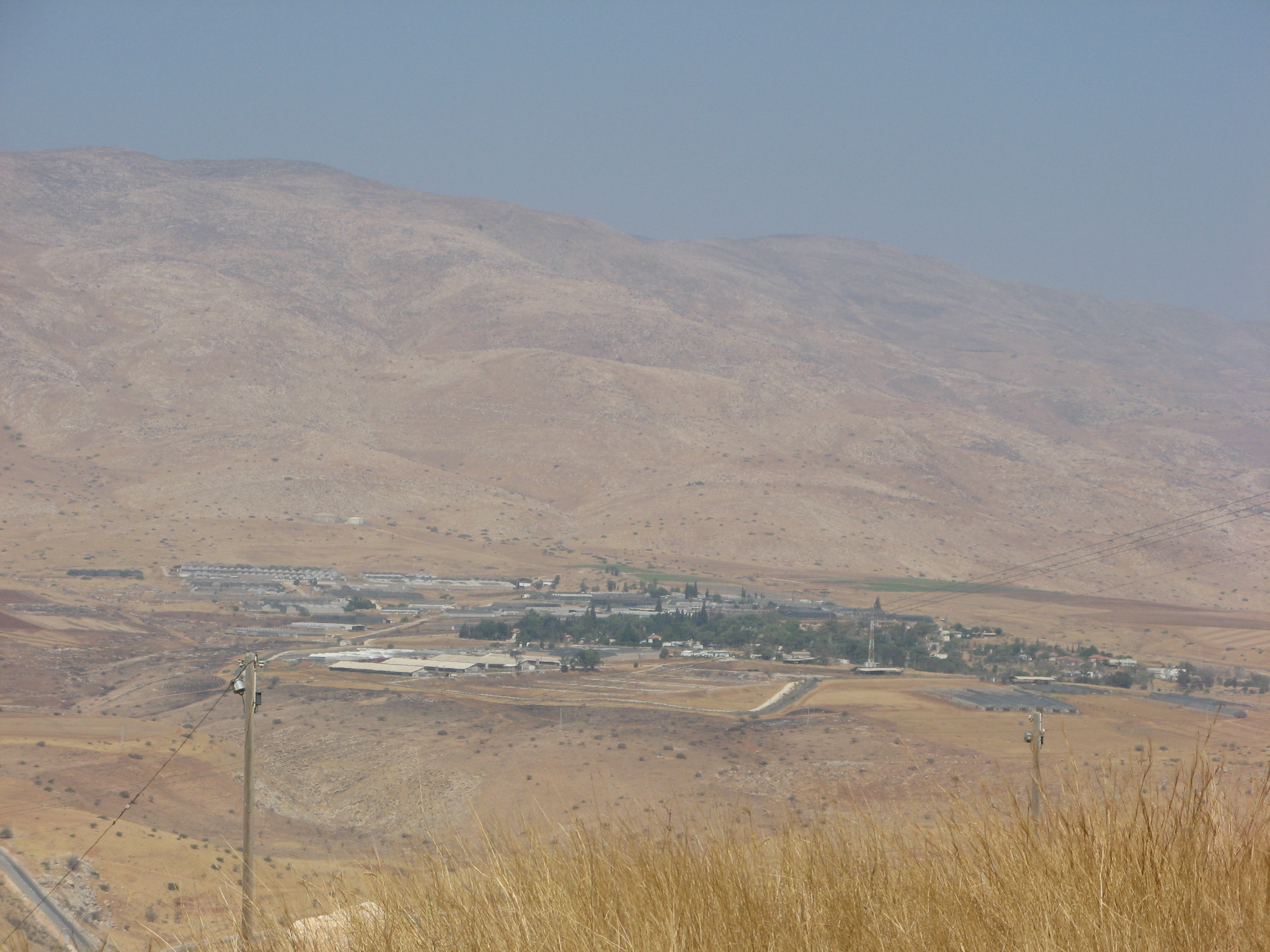
- Etymology: Red Soil
- Location within the Northern West Bank Location within the West Bank
- Coordinates: 32°11′56″N 35°26′6″E
- Country: Palestine
- District: Judea and Samaria Area
- Council: Bik'at HaYarden
- Region: West Bank
- Affiliation: Agricultural Union
- Founded: 1971
- Population (2024): 286

Hamra (Hebrew: חמרה, lit. 'Red Soil') is an Israeli settlement organized as a moshav in the West Bank. Located in the Jordan Valley and covering 3,500 dunams, it falls under the jurisdiction of Bik'at HaYarden Regional Council. In 2024 it had a population of 286.

The international community considers Israeli settlements in the West Bank illegal under international law, but the Israeli government disputes this.

== History ==
The moshav was founded in 1971 and was initially named Atarot, before being renamed after nearby Tel Hamra.

According to ARIJ, Israel confiscated land from two nearby Palestinian villages in order to construct Hamra; 1,370 dunams from Furush Beit Dajan, 192 dunams for a military checkpoint close to Hamra, and an unspecified amount from Beit Dajan.

In 2020 a family in the nearby Humsa al-Tata village, located above the Hamra checkpoint, was ordered to destroy their home and concrete castings around contiguous structures, including a well and olive trees, after the Israeli government declared it was on an archaeological site. The owner stated that they had lived there since their great-grandfather's time and no-one had ever heard of antiquities on their land.
