= Mekhora =

Moshav and Israeli settlement in the West Bank

Mekhora: מְכוֹרָה (Hebrew)
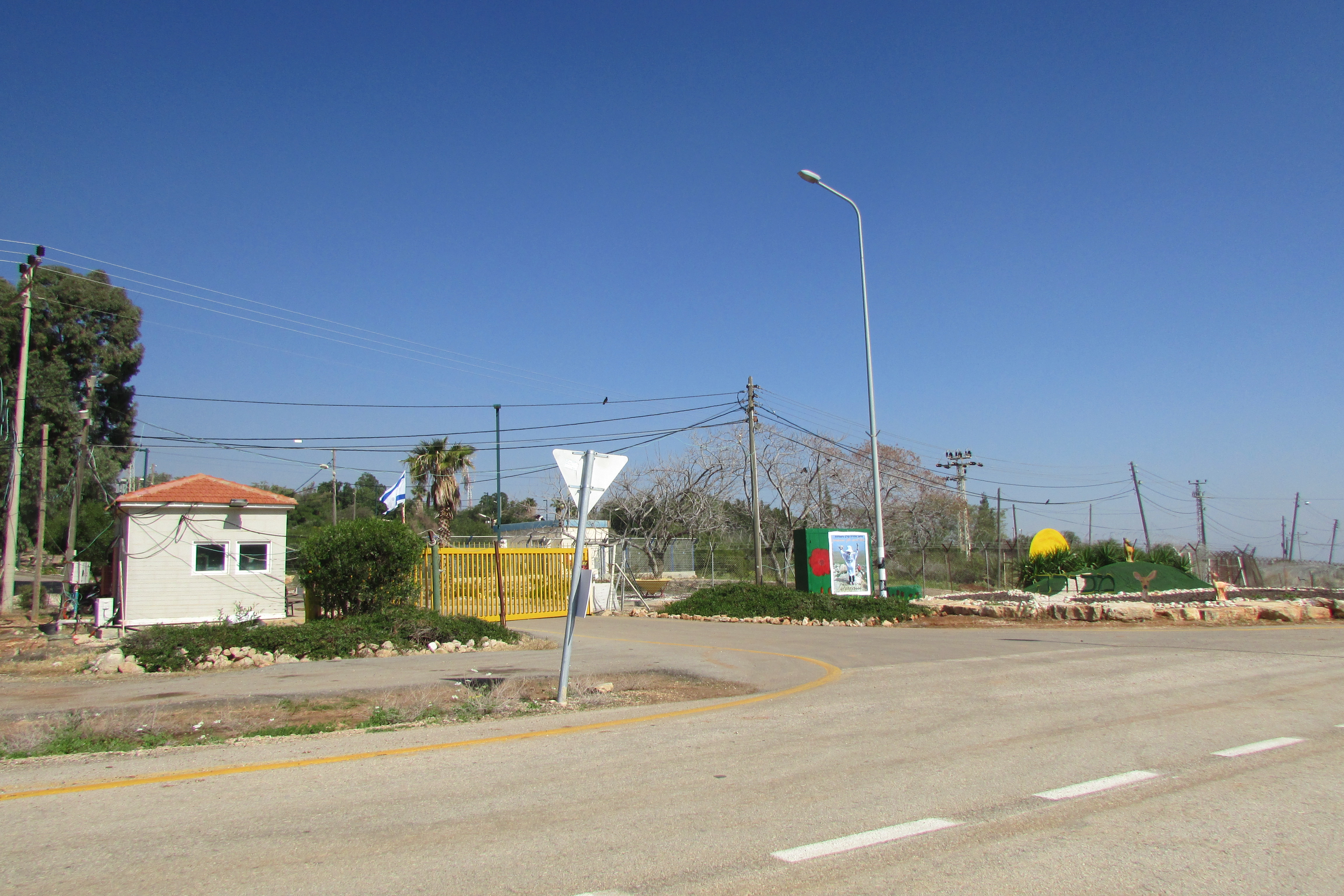
- Entrance to Mekhora

- Location within the Northern West Bank
- Coordinates: 32°9′55″N 35°25′22″E
- Country: Palestine
- District: Judea and Samaria Area
- Council: Bik'at HaYarden
- Region: West Bank
- Affiliation: Agricultural Union
- Founded: 1973
- Founder: Nahal
- Population (2024): 270

Mekhora (Hebrew: מְכוֹרָה, lit. 'Homeland') is an Israeli settlement in the West Bank organized as a moshav. Located in the Jordan Valley, it falls under the jurisdiction of Bik'at HaYarden Regional Council. In 2024 it had a population of 270.

The international community considers Israeli settlements in the West Bank illegal under international law, but the Israeli government disputes this.

== History ==
According to ARIJ, in 1980 Israel confiscated 438 dunams of land from the Palestinian villages of Al-Jiftlik, Beit Dajan and Beit Furik in order to construct Mekhora.

The moshav was founded in 1973 by a Nahal brigade, and was originally named Nahal Mekhora.
