= Jurish =

- Municipality type D (Village council)

Arabic transcription(s)
  - Arabic: جُريش
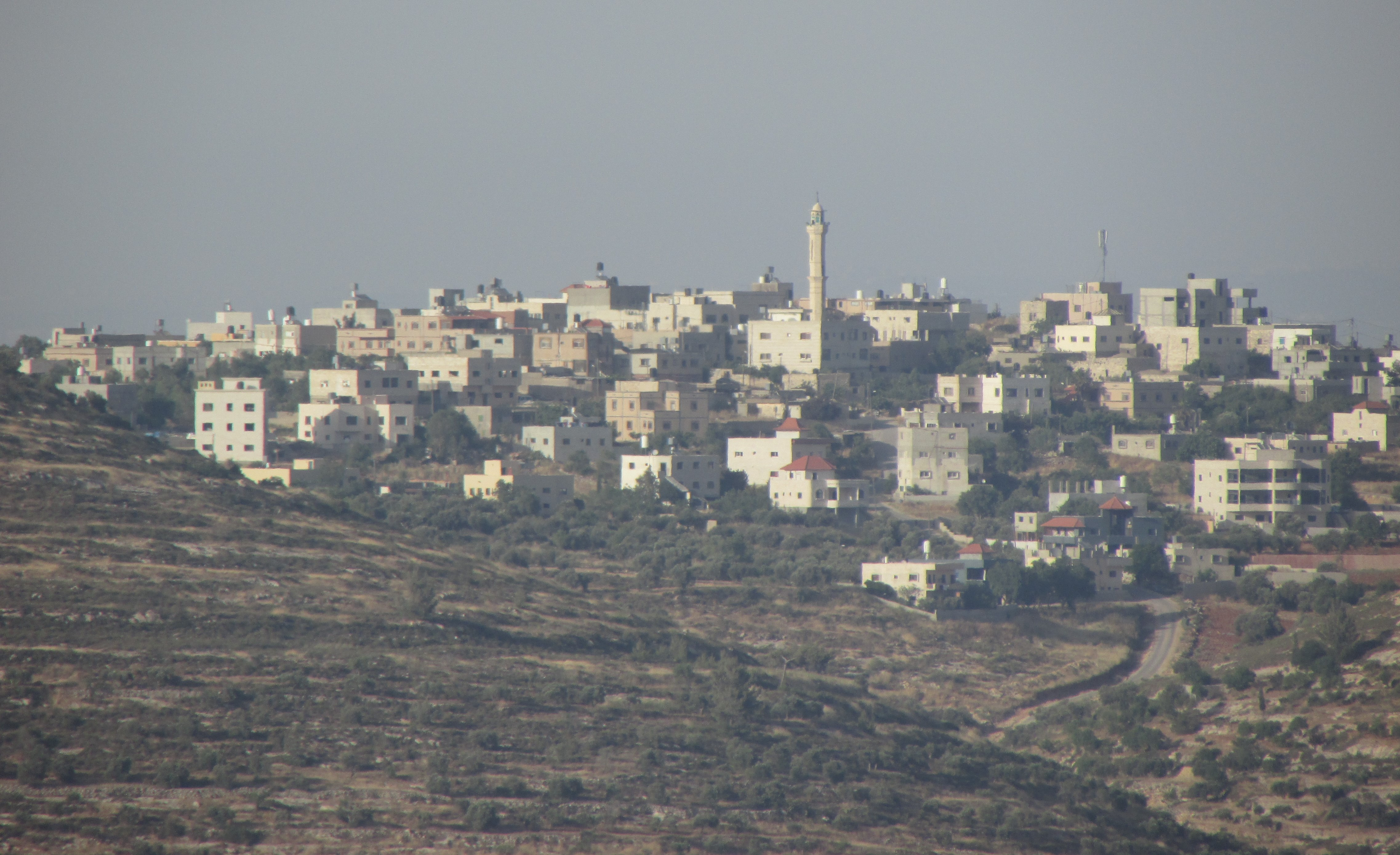
- Jurish from the south west

- Location of Jurish within Palestine
- Coordinates: 32°06′09″N 35°19′20″E
- Palestine grid: 180/167
- State: State of Palestine
- Governorate: Nablus

Government
  - Type: Village council

Population (2017)
  - Total: 1,541
- Name meaning: Jurish, from personal name

Jurish (Arabic: جُريش) is a Palestinian town in Nablus Governorate in the northern West Bank, located 27 kilometers southeast of Nablus. According to the Palestinian Central Bureau of Statistics (PCBS), the town had a population of 1,541 inhabitants in 2017.

== Location ==
Jurish is located 14.24 kilometers (8.85 mi) southeast of Nablus. It is bordered by Tal al Khashabe to the east, Aqraba to the north, Qabalan to the north and west, Talfit to the west, and Qusra and Majdal Bani Fadil to the south.

== History ==
Sherds from the Early Bronze, Middle Bronze, Iron Age I, IA II, Hellenistic and the Roman era have been found here.

It has been proposed to identify Jurish with Geresh, a Jewish village of the late Second Temple period mentioned by Josephus as the birthplace of the rebel leader Simeon Bar-Giora (a minority view identified Geresh with Jerash in modern-day Jordan). This identification is based on the name preservation and Bar Giora's activities in the toparchy of Acraba during the early phases of the First Jewish–Roman War. It has been also suggested that later the place was destroyed by the Roman general Vespasian.

C. R. Conder and HH Kitchener remarked that to the north-east of Jurish was "a sacred place," adding that the site "appears to be the ancient Capharetæa (Kefr 'Atya), a Samaritan town, mentioned by Justin Martyr. The two sites are, in fact, one, and the ruin apparently preserves the old name."

Sherds from the Umayyad/Abbasid and Mamluk eras have also been found here.

=== Ottoman era ===
In 1517, the village was included in the Ottoman Empire with the rest of Palestine, and in the 1596 tax-records it appeared as Juris, located in the Nahiya of Jabal Qubal, part of Nablus Sanjak. The population was 16 households, all Muslim. They paid a fixed tax rate of 33,3% on agricultural products, such as wheat, barley, summer crops, olive trees, goats and beehives, in addition to occasional revenues and a fixed tax for people of Nablus area; a total of 2,000 akçe. In the same tax-records, nearby Kafr 'Atiyya (at grid 181/167) had a population of 40 Muslim households, and paid 9,000 akçe in revenue. Sherds from the early Ottoman era have also been found here.

In 1852, Edward Robinson, passing among "so much good land; so many fine and arable, though not large plains," noted Jurish on a southern hill. In the same year, van de Velde described land near Jurish as "exceedingly beautiful and fertile. I had here a ride of an hour through valleys of such rare beauty and natural richness, that I feel myself quite unable to give you an adequate conception of it." The village itself provided excellent accommodation and hospitality for visitors.

In 1870 Victor Guérin came from the north, noted first the ruins of Kefr A'athia, where corn was planted among the ruins. He then came to the spring Ain Jurish, where water was collected in a rectangular basin. He then continued to the top of the hill, where the village Jurish was situated. It had once been much larger, but was now reduced to about 20 inhabited houses. A shrine was consecrated to a Sheikh Hatem.

In 1882, the Palestine Exploration Fund's "Survey of Western Palestine" (SWP) described Jurish as: "A small village on a hill-top, with olives to the east."

=== British Mandate era ===
In the 1922 census of Palestine conducted by the British Mandate authorities, Jurish had a population of 195 Muslims, increasing in the 1931 census when Jurish, together with Kafr 'Atiya had to 236 Muslim inhabitants, in 59 houses.

In the 1945 statistics, the population of Jurish (with Kafr Atiya) was 340 Muslims, while the total land area was 8,207 dunams, according to an official land and population survey. Of this, 1,358 dunams were allocated for plantations and irrigable land, 4,249 for cereals, while 14 dunams were classified as built-up areas.

=== Jordanian era ===
In the wake of the 1948 Arab–Israeli War, and after the 1949 Armistice Agreements, Jurish came under Jordanian rule.

The Jordanian census of 1961 found 419 inhabitants.

=== Post-1967 ===
Since the Six-Day War in 1967, Jurish has been under Israeli occupation.

After the 1995 accords, 62% of village land has been defined as Area B land, while the remaining 38% is Area C. Israel has confiscated 17 dunums of Jurish village land for the construction of the Israeli settlement of Migdalim, in addition to confiscating land for the road Route 505.

In October, 2021, it was reported that Israeli settlers set fire to olive trees belonging to Jurish, on land close to Migdalim.

== Demography ==
Some of Jurish's residents originated in the former village of Kafr 'Atia (181/168).

Jurish is said to be the ancestral origin for the majority of inhabitants in Beit Dajan.

== Bibliography ==
- Avi-Yonah, M. (1976). Gazetteer of Roman Palestine. QEDEM 5. Institute of Archaeology, Hebrew University of Jerusalem.
- Barron, J.B., ed. (1923). Palestine: Report and General Abstracts of the Census of 1922. Government of Palestine.
- Conder, C.R.; Kitchener, H.H. (1882). The Survey of Western Palestine: Memoirs of the Topography, Orography, Hydrography, and Archaeology. Vol. 2. London: Committee of the Palestine Exploration Fund.
- Finkelstein, I.; Lederman, Zvi, eds. (1997). Highlands of many cultures. Tel Aviv: Institute of Archaeology of Tel Aviv University Publications Section. ISBN 965-440-007-3.
- Government of Jordan, Department of Statistics (1964). First Census of Population and Housing. Volume I: Final Tables; General Characteristics of the Population (PDF).
- Government of Palestine, Department of Statistics (1945). Village Statistics, April, 1945.
- Guérin, V. (1875). Description Géographique Historique et Archéologique de la Palestine (in French). Vol. 2: Samarie, pt. 2. Paris: L'Imprimerie Nationale.
- Hadawi, S. (1970). Village Statistics of 1945: A Classification of Land and Area ownership in Palestine. Palestine Liberation Organization Research Center.
- Hütteroth, W.-D.; Abdulfattah, K. (1977). Historical Geography of Palestine, Transjordan and Southern Syria in the Late 16th Century. Erlanger Geographische Arbeiten, Sonderband 5. Erlangen, Germany: Vorstand der Fränkischen Geographischen Gesellschaft. ISBN 3-920405-41-2.
- Mills, E., ed. (1932). Census of Palestine 1931. Population of Villages, Towns and Administrative Areas. Jerusalem: Government of Palestine.
- Palmer, E.H. (1881). The Survey of Western Palestine: Arabic and English Name Lists Collected During the Survey by Lieutenants Conder and Kitchener, R. E. Transliterated and Explained by E.H. Palmer. Committee of the Palestine Exploration Fund.
- Relandi, H. (1714). Hadriani Relandi Palaestina ex monumentis veteribus illustrata (in Latin). Vol. 2. Trajecti Batavorum : Ex libraria Guilielmi Broedelet.
- Robinson, E.; Smith, E. (1856). Later Biblical Researches in Palestine and adjacent regions: A Journal of Travels in the year 1852. London: John Murray.
- Tsafrir, Y.; Leah Di Segni; Judith Green (1994). (TIR): Tabula Imperii Romani: Judaea, Palaestina. Jerusalem: Israel Academy of Sciences and Humanities. ISBN 965-208-107-8.
- van de Velde, C.W.M. (1854). Narrative of a Journey through Syria and Palestine in 1851 and 1852. Vol. 2. Edinburgh and London: William Blackwood and Sons.
