= Qabalan =

- Municipality type C

Arabic transcription(s)
  - Arabic: قبلان
  - Latin: Kubalan (unofficial)
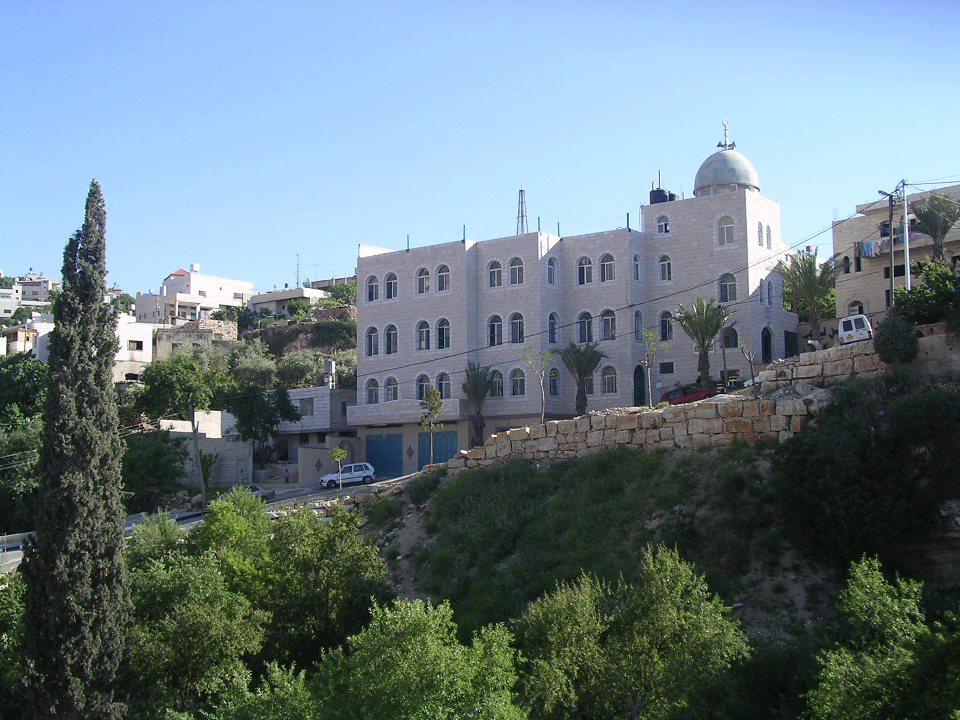
- Qabalan

- Location of Qabalan within Palestine
- Coordinates: 32°06′07″N 35°17′17″E
- Palestine grid: 177/167
- State: State of Palestine
- Governorate: Nablus

Government
  - Type: Municipality

Population (2017)
  - Total: 8,195
- Name meaning: Fronting, or possibly from Kublan, a corruption of the Turkish word for lion.

Qabalan (Arabic: قبلان) is a Palestinian town in the Nablus Governorate in the eastern West Bank, located 19 kilometers (12 mi) southeast of Nablus. According to the Palestinian Central Bureau of Statistics (PCBS), the town had a population of 8,195 inhabitants in 2017.

== Location ==
Qabalan is located 13.4 kilometers (8.3 mi) south of Nablus. It is bordered by Aqraba and Jurish to the east, Talfit and As Sawiya to the south, As Sawiya and Yatma to the west, and Beita and Osarin to the north.

Qabalan sits atop a slope that descends into a small, fertile valley.

== History ==
Potsherds from the Iron Age I and Iron Age II have been found here.

The SWP noted that: "the ruin to the east [of the village] consists of heaps of stones". Finkelstein noted that "most of the area of the present village is relatively modern".

=== Ottoman era ===
In 1517, the village was included in the Ottoman Empire with the rest of Palestine, and it appeared in the 1596 tax-records as Qabalan, located in the Nahiya of Jabal Qubal of the Liwa of Nablus. The population was 4 households, all Muslim. They paid a fixed tax rate of 33,3% on agricultural products, such as wheat, barley, olive trees, goats and beehives, in addition to occasional revenues and a fixed tax for people of Nablus area; a total of 2,410 akçe. Sherds from the early Ottoman era have also been found here.

In 1838 Edward Robinson noted Kubalan on the south side of the valley, "surrounded by vineyards and large groves of olive and fig trees." It was located in El-Beitawy district, east of Nablus.

In 1882, the PEF's Survey of Western Palestine (SWP) described Kubalan as: "a village of moderate size, on high ground, with olives round it, and wells."

=== British Mandate era ===
In the 1922 census of Palestine, conducted by the British Mandate authorities, Qabalan had a population of 771 Muslims, increasing in the 1931 census to 936 Muslims, in 207 houses.

In the 1945 statistics Qabalan had a population of 1,310, all Muslims, with 8,290 dunams of land, according to an official land and population survey. Of this, 3,948 dunams were plantations and irrigable land, 2,383 were used for cereals, while 72 dunams were built-up land.

=== Jordanian era ===
In the wake of the 1948 Arab–Israeli War, and after the 1949 Armistice Agreements, Qabalan came under Jordanian rule.

The Jordanian census of 1961 found 1,867 inhabitants.

=== 1967, aftermath ===
Since the Six-Day War in 1967, Qabalan has been under Israeli occupation along with the rest of the Palestinian territories.

After the 1995 accords, 67% of the village land is in Area B, while the remaining 33% is in Area C. There have been a number of attacks on the people of Qabalan, their land and property from the nearby Israeli settlements.

== Demography ==
According to the geographer David Grossman, the inhabitants of Qabalan trace their origins to the town of Halhul near Hebron, the village of Kafr Atiyya near Nablus, and areas in present-day Syria.

== Bibliography ==
- Barron, J.B., ed. (1923). Palestine: Report and General Abstracts of the Census of 1922. Government of Palestine.
- Conder, C.R.; Kitchener, H.H. (1882). The Survey of Western Palestine: Memoirs of the Topography, Orography, Hydrography, and Archaeology. Vol. 2. London: Committee of the Palestine Exploration Fund.
- Finkelstein, I.; Lederman, Zvi, eds. (1997). Highlands of many cultures. Tel Aviv: Institute of Archaeology of Tel Aviv University Publications Section. ISBN 965-440-007-3.
- Government of Jordan, Department of Statistics (1964). First Census of Population and Housing. Volume I: Final Tables; General Characteristics of the Population (PDF).
- Government of Palestine, Department of Statistics (1945). Village Statistics, April, 1945.
- Hadawi, S. (1970). Village Statistics of 1945: A Classification of Land and Area ownership in Palestine. Palestine Liberation Organization Research Center.
- Hütteroth, W.-D.; Abdulfattah, K. (1977). Historical Geography of Palestine, Transjordan and Southern Syria in the Late 16th Century. Erlanger Geographische Arbeiten, Sonderband 5. Erlangen, Germany: Vorstand der Fränkischen Geographischen Gesellschaft. ISBN 3-920405-41-2.
- Mills, E., ed. (1932). Census of Palestine 1931. Population of Villages, Towns and Administrative Areas. Jerusalem: Government of Palestine.
- Palmer, E.H. (1881). The Survey of Western Palestine: Arabic and English Name Lists Collected During the Survey by Lieutenants Conder and Kitchener, R. E. Transliterated and Explained by E.H. Palmer. Committee of the Palestine Exploration Fund.
- Robinson, E.; Smith, E. (1841). Biblical Researches in Palestine, Mount Sinai and Arabia Petraea: A Journal of Travels in the year 1838. Vol. 3. Boston: Crocker & Brewster.
