= Beit Furik =

- Municipality type A (City)

Arabic transcription(s)
  - Arabic: بيت فوريك
  - Latin: Bayt Furik (official)
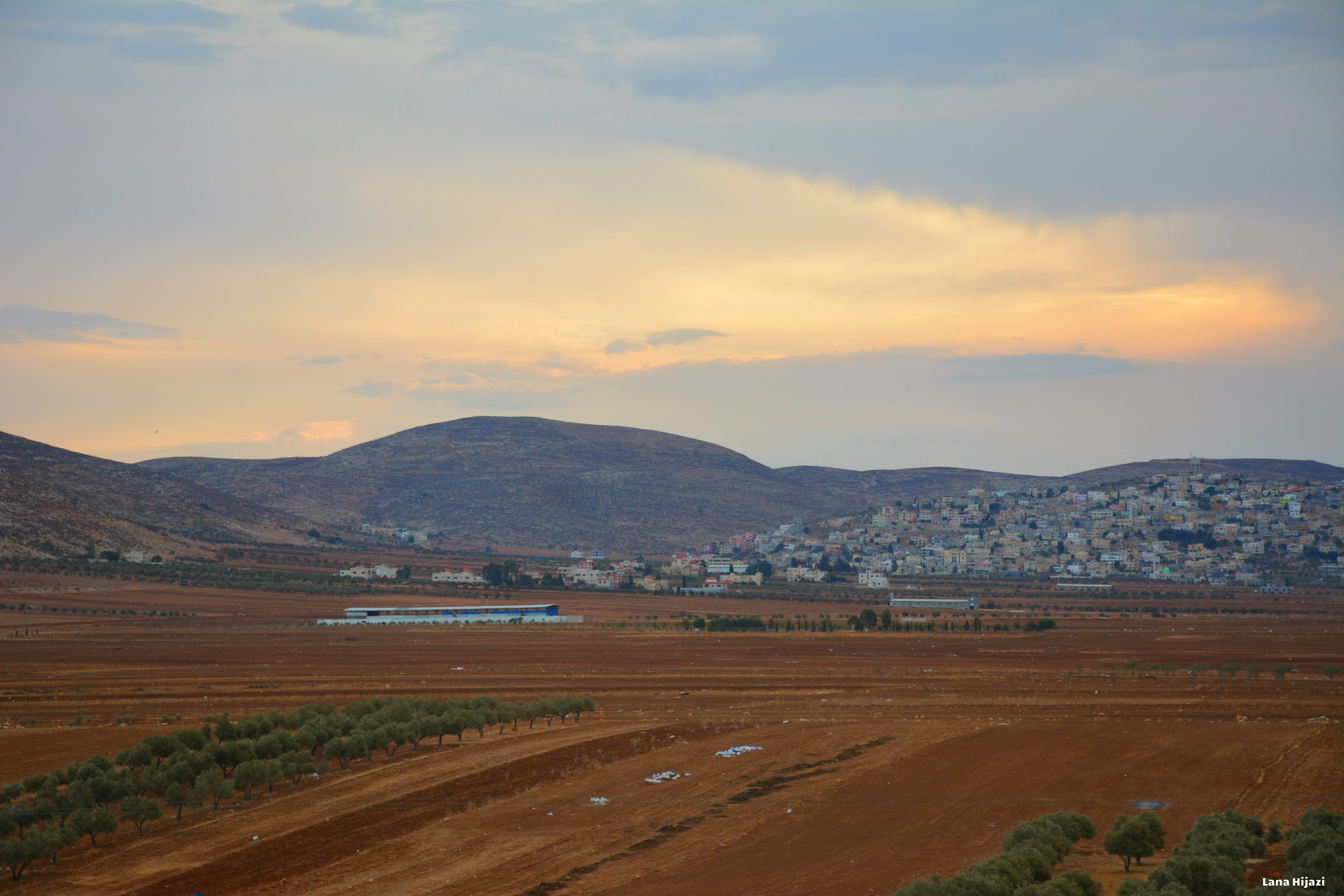
- Beit Furik

- Location of Beit Furik within Palestine
- Coordinates: 32°10′37″N 35°20′11″E
- Palestine grid: 181/175
- Country: Palestine
- Governorate: Nablus

Government
  - Type: City

Population (2017)
  - Total: 13,477
- Name meaning: The house of Furik

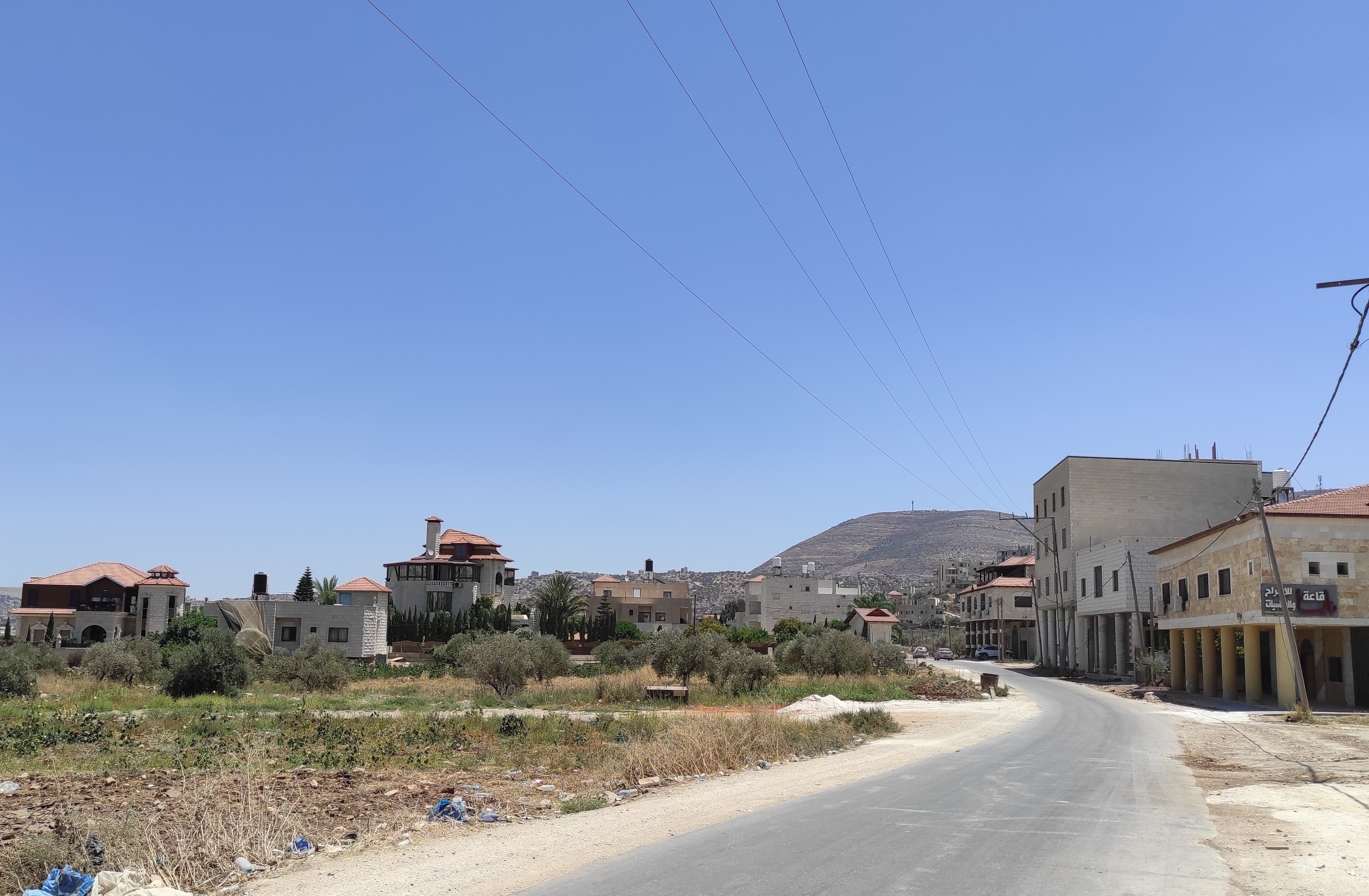
Beit furic

Beit Furik (Arabic: بيت فوريك) is a town located nine kilometers southeast of Nablus, in the Nablus Governorate of the northern West Bank, Palestine. According to the Palestinian Central Bureau of Statistics, the town had a population of 13,477 inhabitants in 2017.

== Location ==
Beit Furik is located 8.24 km south east of Nablus. It is bordered by Al Jiftlik to the east, Ar Rajman, Yanun, and 'Awarta to the south, Rujeib and Nablus to the west, and Beit Dajan, Salim and Deir al Hatab to the north.

== History ==
Bayt Furik was an ancient Samaritan village. Old tombs have been found here.

The place is mentioned in the Samaritan Tolidah and in the Continuatio of the Samaritan Chronicle of Abu l-Fath. It has also been suggested that this place is mentioned in the Samaritan Chronicle. Neubauer, and others, suggested that it was the place called Ferka in the Talmud, but Abel suggested locating that at Farkha.

Samaritan author Benyamim Tsedaka lists two Samaritan families, Maarhib and Qaakai, who resided in Beit Furik before their eventual disappearance through destruction or conversion.

In the Crusader era, it was known as Bethflori, and in 1241 CE there was fought a battle here, according to Ibn el-Jawzi.

=== Ottoman era ===
In 1517, the village was included in the Ottoman Empire with the rest of Palestine, and in the 1596 tax-records it appeared as Bayt Furik, located in the Nahiya of Jabal Qubal, part of Nablus Sanjak. The population was 68 households, all Muslim. They paid a fixed tax rate of 33,3% on agricultural products, such as wheat, barley, summer crops, olive trees, goats and beehives, a press for olive oil or grape syrup, in addition to occasional revenues and a fixed tax for people of Nablus area; a total of 16,665 akçe.

In 1838, Edward Robinson noted it on his travels in the area, and as part of the El-Beitawy district, east of Nablus.

In 1870, Victor Guérin noted Beit Foureik sitting on the slopes of a hill, with a belt of olives surrounding it.

In 1882, the Palestine Exploration Fund's Survey of Western Palestine described it as: "A small village in a nook of the hills near the plain of Salim. It has a well to the east."

During the 19th century and mid-20th century, Beit Furik was the main supplier of lime to the Nabulsi soap industry based in Nablus.

=== British Mandate era ===
In the 1922 census of Palestine conducted by the British Mandate authorities, Bait Furik had a population of 744 Muslims increasing in the 1931 census, where Beit Furik (together with the smaller location Kh. Beita) had a population of 867 Muslims, in a total of 262 houses.

In the 1945 statistics Beit Furik (including Kh. Kafr Beita) had a population of 1,240, all Muslims, with 36,663 dunams of land, according to an official land and population survey. Of this, 2,645 dunams were plantations and irrigable land, 12,453 used for cereals, while 53 dunams were built-up land.

=== Jordanian era ===
In the wake of the 1948 Arab–Israeli War, and after the 1949 Armistice Agreements, Beit Furik came under Jordanian rule.

In 1961, the population of Beit Furik was 1,997 persons.

=== 1967, aftermath ===
Since the Six-Day War in 1967, Beit Furik has been under Israeli occupation along with the rest of the Palestinian territories. The population in the 1967 census conducted by Israel was 2,416, of whom 7 originated from the Israeli territory.

Under the interim Oslo Peace Accords, areas of the West Bank were divided into various categories. According to ARIJ, 45% of the village land is in Area B, while the remaining 55% is in Area C.

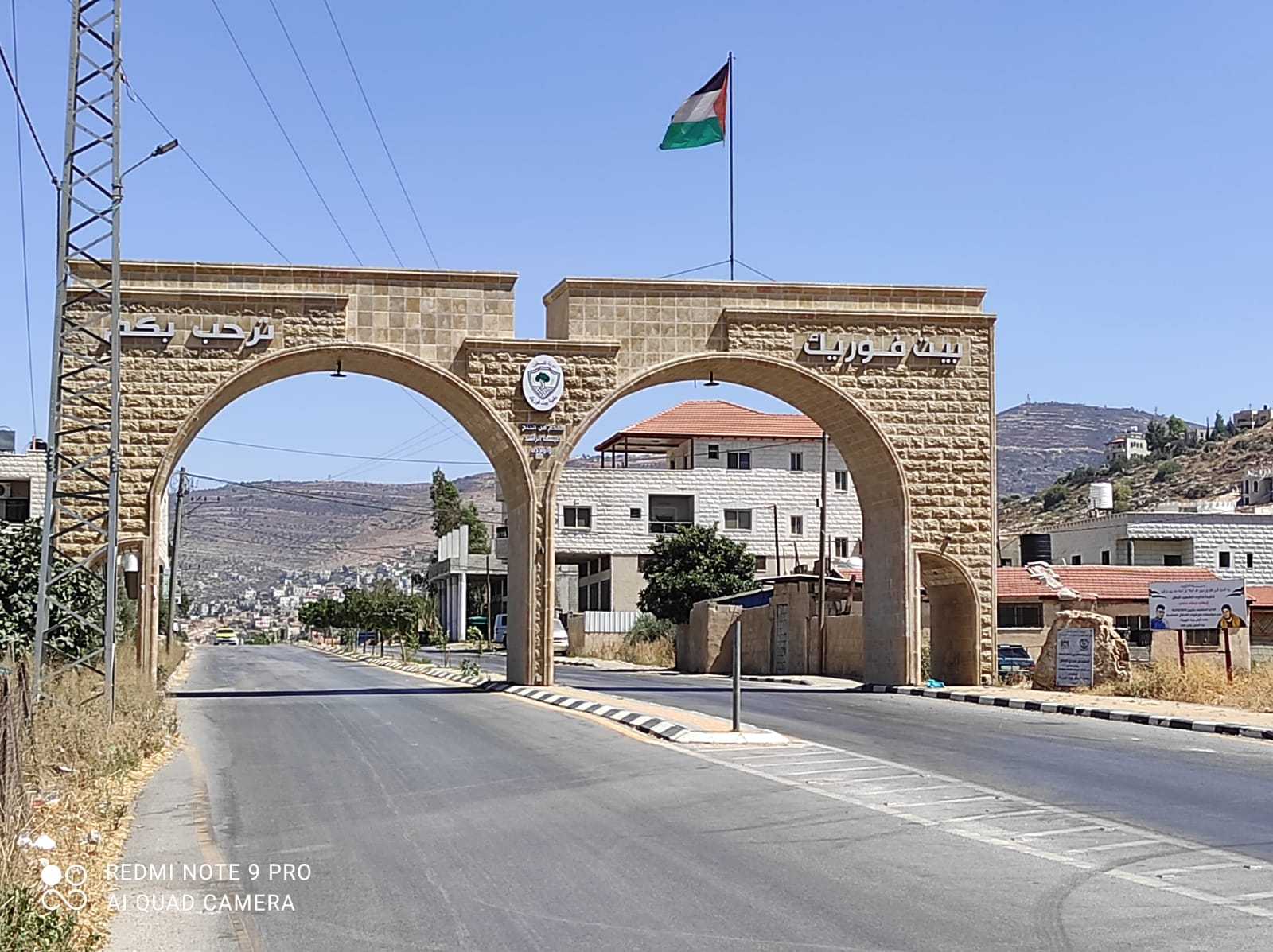
Entrance to Beit Furik

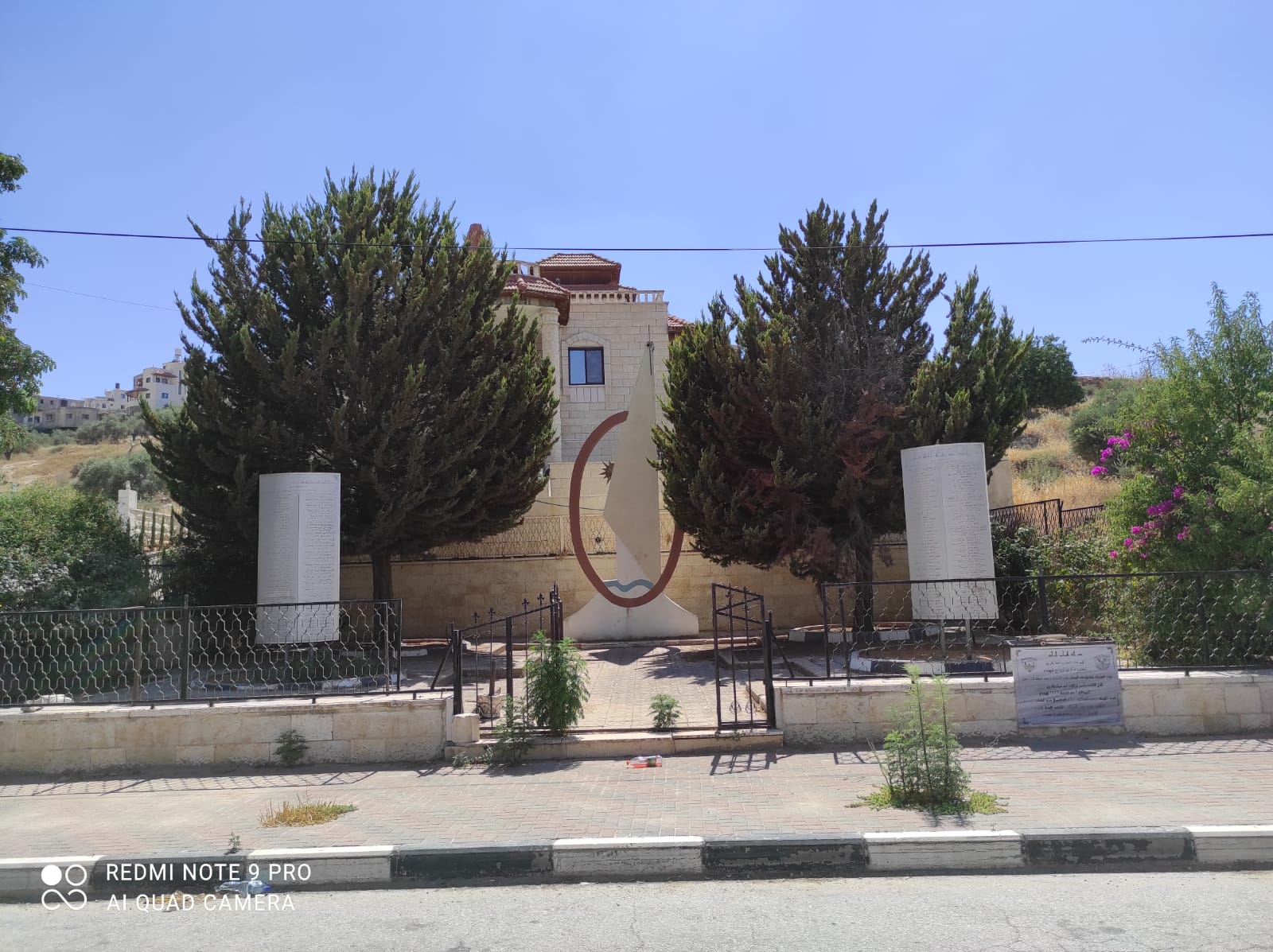
A monument in Beit Furik in memory of the villagers who have been killed since 1967

Israel has confiscated 441 dunums from Beit Furik for the two Israeli settlements of Itamar and Michola. In addition it has confiscated land for Israeli military bases, Israeli settlement roads, and Israeli fence.

== Demography ==
The inhabitants of Beit Furik belong to various families, such as the Al-Haj Mohammad, Hanani, Khatatbah, Mletat, and Nasasrah families.

== Bibliography ==
- Barron, J.B., ed. (1923). Palestine: Report and General Abstracts of the Census of 1922. Government of Palestine.
- Conder, C.R; Kitchener, H.H. (1882). The Survey of Western Palestine: Memoirs of the Topography, Orography, Hydrography, and Archaeology. Vol. 2. London: Committee of the Palestine Exploration Fund.
- Conder, C.R. (1876). "Samarian Topography". Quarterly Statement - Palestine Exploration Fund. 8 (4): 182–197. doi:10.1179/peq.1876.8.4.182.
- Conder, C.R. (1877). "Notes from the Memoir". Quarterly Statement - Palestine Exploration Fund. 9: 20–30.
- Conder, C.R. (1890). "Norman Palestine". Quarterly Statement - Palestine Exploration Fund. 22: 29–37. doi:10.1179/peq.1890.22.1.29.
- Dauphin, C. (1998). La Palestine byzantine, Peuplement et Populations. BAR International Series 726 (in French). Vol. III : Catalogue. Oxford: Archeopress. ISBN 0-860549-05-4.
- Doumani, B. (1995). Rediscovering Palestine: Merchants and Peasants in Jabal Nablus. University of California Press.
- Finkelstein, I.; Lederman, Zvi, eds. (1997). Highlands of many cultures. Tel Aviv: Institute of Archaeology of Tel Aviv University Publications Section. ISBN 965-440-007-3.
- Government of Jordan, Department of Statistics (1964). First Census of Population and Housing. Volume I: Final Tables; General Characteristics of the Population (PDF).
- Government of Palestine, Department of Statistics (1945). Village Statistics, April, 1945.
- Guérin, V. (1874). Description Géographique Historique et Archéologique de la Palestine (in French). Vol. 2: Samarie, pt. 1. Paris: L'Imprimerie Nationale.
- Hadawi, S. (1970). Village Statistics of 1945: A Classification of Land and Area ownership in Palestine. Palestine Liberation Organization Research Center.
- Hütteroth, W.-D.; Abdulfattah, K. (1977). Historical Geography of Palestine, Transjordan and Southern Syria in the Late 16th Century. Erlanger Geographische Arbeiten, Sonderband 5. Erlangen, Germany: Vorstand der Fränkischen Geographischen Gesellschaft. ISBN 3-920405-41-2.
- Mills, E., ed. (1932). Census of Palestine 1931. Population of Villages, Towns and Administrative Areas. Jerusalem: Government of Palestine.
- Neubauer, A. (1868). La géographie du Talmud : mémoire couronné par l'Académie des inscriptions et belles-lettres (in French). Paris: Lévy.
- Palmer, E.H. (1881). The Survey of Western Palestine: Arabic and English Name Lists Collected During the Survey by Lieutenants Conder and Kitchener, R. E. Transliterated and Explained by E.H. Palmer. Committee of the Palestine Exploration Fund.
- Robinson, E.; Smith, E. (1841). Biblical Researches in Palestine, Mount Sinai and Arabia Petraea: A Journal of Travels in the year 1838. Vol. 3. Boston: Crocker & Brewster.
- Röhricht, R. (1887). "Studien zur mittelalterlichen Geographie und Topographie Syriens". Zeitschrift des Deutschen Palästina-Vereins. 10: 195–344. (p. 205)
- Röhricht, R. (1893). (RRH) Regesta regni Hierosolymitani (MXCVII-MCCXCI) (in Latin). Berlin: Libraria Academica Wageriana. ( p. 30, no. 121)
