= Samaria Ostraca =

Hebrew-inscribed ostraca found in Samaria, the capital of ancient Israel

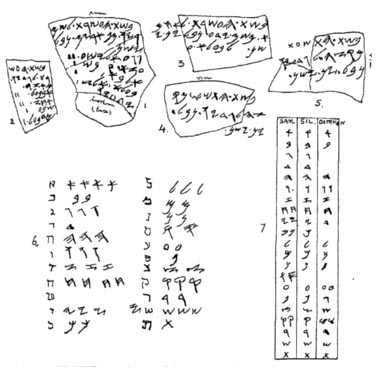
- Sketch of a selection of ostraca
- Material: Clay ostraca
- Writing: Hebrew (Paleo-Hebrew script)
- Created: c. 850–750 BC
- Discovered: 1910
- Present location: Istanbul Archaeology Museums
- Culture: Ancient Israel

The Samaria Ostraca are a collection of 102 inscribed pottery fragments discovered at the royal acropolis of Samaria, the capital of the northern kingdom of Israel. The inscriptions, written with carbon-based ink in a professional cursive Paleo-Hebrew script, record the delivery of aged wine and refined olive oil. Unearthed in 1910 by George Andrew Reisner in a fill deposit beneath the floor of the so-called "Ostraca House," the sherds are regarded as one of the most important discoveries for reconstructing the economy, administrative organization, and scribal practices of ancient Israel in the 8th century BCE.

From a paleographic perspective, the handwriting on the ostraca represents a transitional phase in the history of the Hebrew alphabet in ancient Israel. The texts show more development than the 9th-century Mesha Stele from Dhibon but less maturity than the late 8th-century Siloam inscription in Jerusalem. The language is typically identified as a northern Hebrew dialect.

A distinctive feature of the corpus is its notational system, which employs Hebrew words for the regnal years nine and ten but shifts to Egyptian numerals for years fifteen and seventeen. The records measure goods in small units called nbl (jars) and identify places of origin associated with Manassite clans (e.g., Abiezer, Shemida, Heleq) located within a short radius of the capital, in the western Shechem Syncline.

Of the 102 ostraca found, only 63 are legible. The primary inscriptions are known as KAI 183–188. They are currently held in the collection of the Istanbul Archaeology Museums.

== Description ==
=== Context and dating ===
The Samaria ostraca were discovered in a fill beneath the floor of the "Ostraca House" at Samaria. Ivan Kaufman noted that these sherds must have been discarded and used as leveling debris before the building's floor was laid, placing their origin in "Period IV" of the city. This period corresponds to the mid-8th century BCE, before the building's destruction by the Assyrians in 722/721 BCE .

Ivan Kaufman wrote that the Samaria Ostraca should be dated to approximately the midpoint between 800 and 725 BCE, citing the second quarter of the 8th century BCE as the most likely period of production. He argues that the handwriting is more advanced than the cursive found at the Kuntillet Ajrud inscriptions (c. 800 BCE) but less mature than the inscriptions on Period VI pottery (c. 725 BCE), leading him to conclude they were written during the second quarter of the 8th century BCE. The inscriptions include specific chronological references, such as "year nine" and "year fifteen". These dates have led scholars to suggest that the system corresponds to the regnal years of one of Israel's kings. One theory identifies the king as Jeroboam II, a view that epigrapher Charles Rollston characterizes as "compelling".

=== Writing ===
The ostraca were written by professional scribes who used carbon-based ink and a highly developed cursive Hebrew script. There appears to have been a deliberate method in selecting these materials for bookkeeping, as records concerning oil were primarily written on gray jar sherds, while wine deliveries were typically noted on reddish bowl fragments.

From a paleographic perspective, the handwriting on the ostraca represents a transitional phase in the history of the alphabet in ancient Israel. The script shows significant development beyond the Mesha Stele (c. 840 BCE) but has not yet reached the maturity found in the Siloam inscription from the late 8th century. The script is characterized by flowing, elegant strokes that vary in thickness, suggesting the use of a reed pen with a specialized tip. This calligraphic style likely drew inspiration from Egyptian hieratic practices, which were designed for efficiency in recording data on papyrus.

They are written on fragments of five different types of vessels—large thick amphorae, with a drab or grey surface; large thin amphorae, with a drab or grey surface; jugs of soft brown ware with a reddish slip; basins of the same ware; and bowls of coarse ware with a red or yellow slip, all of these presumably being vessels that were used in receiving and storing the revenue. Sherds with a smooth surface or a slip would naturally be preferred for writing.

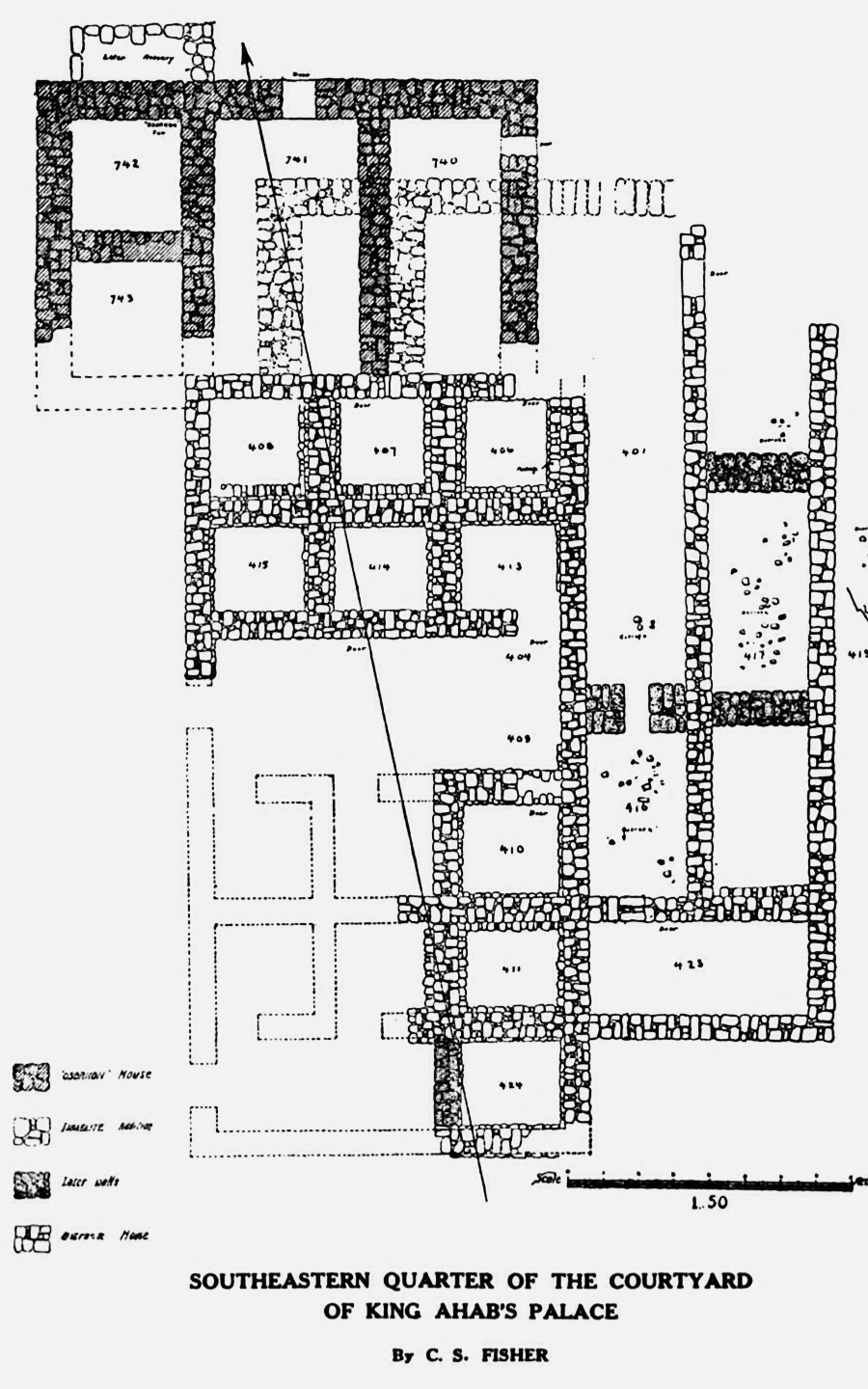
Diagram of the excavation

These ostraca are evidently part of a somewhat clumsy method of book-keeping. Either they were a "day-book," notes of daily receipts to be written up in some form of "ledger" afterwards, or they were the sole record kept of the amount of wine and oil received in various years from various places. It is possible they were written and handed in by the payer, not by the receiver.

All of them began with a date, such as "In the ninth, tenth, or fifteenth year" presumably of the reign of Jeroboam II. This is followed by the amount and quality of wine or oil received, with the name of the place where it came from and of the giver, such as "in the tenth year wine of Kerm-ha-Tell for a jar of fine oil" where evidently wine was accepted in place of fine oil. "A jar of old wine" and "a jar of fine oil" are the most usual descriptions.

== Research ==
The ostraca were discovered in 1910 during an expedition from Harvard University directed by George Andrew Reisner. Of the 102 ostraca recovered, Reisner published only approximately 60, excluding those he deemed illegible. In 1966, the corpus was significantly expanded when Ivan Kaufman used glass negatives of the original photographs to decipher many of the previously unread inscriptions.

== Geographic distribution and topography ==
The majority of identified sites mentioned in the Samaria ostraca are situated within a radius of 5 to 12 kilometers (four to eight miles) from the capital city of Samaria, placing them within a single day's journey on foot. These locations are primarily concentrated in the western Shechem Syncline, a region providing strategic access to the coastal plain and maritime trade routes. One significant outlier is Yashub, widely identified with the modern village of Yasuf, which is located approximately 19 kilometers from the capital.

The toponyms preserved in the archive correspond closely to the genealogy of the clans of the Tribe of Manasseh as detailed in the biblical books of Joshua 17:2 and Numbers 26:28–33. The texts identify major clan districts, specifically Abiezer, Shemida, Heleq, Asriel, Hoglah, and Noah. Within these districts, specific settlements (e.g. Sefer, Qaṣoh, Azzah, and Elmattan) are identified as the points of origin for the deliveries. The archive omits settlements from the tribal territory of Ephraim and the northern valleys, focusing exclusively on the central hill country of Manasseh.

This distribution indicates that the royal administration relied on a small number of loyal clans who inhabited the capital's immediate hinterland. The correlation between towns and their clans provides a rare archaeological witness to the social structures in northern Israel. The identification often relies on the preservation of ancient Hebrew names in corrupted form in later Arabic toponyms.

Identifiable places in the Samaria Ostraca

| Name in Ostraca | Type | Identification |
|---|---|---|
| Abiezer | Clan district | One of the clans of Manasseh |
| Shemida | Clan district | One of the clans of Manasseh; identified with Michad |
| Heleq | Clan district | One of the clans of Manasseh |
| Asriel | Clan district | One of the clans of Manasseh; located in southern Manasseh |
| Hoglah | Clan district | One of the clans of Manasseh |
| Noah | Clan district | One of the clans of Manasseh; associated with Hepher |
| Yashub (or Yst) | Settlement | Identified with modern Yasuf (disputed) |
| Yasot | Settlement | Town of the clan of Hoglah. Identified with modern Yasid |
| Sefer (or Sfr) | Settlement | Identified with modern Safarin |
| Qaṣoh (or Qsh) | Settlement | Identified with modern Qusin |
| Elmattan | Settlement | Identified with modern Immatain |
| Azzah | Settlement | A town associated with the clan district of Heleq |
| Beerayim | Settlement | Listed as a point of origin for commodities |
| Gib | Settlement | Identified with modern Gaba or Jaba' |
| Tawil | Settlement | Listed as a point of origin for commodities |
| Tillon/Tolon (Ttl) | Settlement | A location mentioned in both the earlier and later year groups |
| Haserot | Settlement | Associated with the clan district of Heleq in year 15, or with modern Asira ash Shamaliya |
| Shufah | Settlement | A town mentioned in the records |

== See also ==
- List of artifacts significant to the Bible
- Arad ostraca
- Lachish letters

== Bibliography ==
- Faigenbaum-Golovin, Shira; Shaus, Arie; Sober, Barak; Turkel, Eli; Piasetzky, Eli; Finkelstein, Israel (2020). "Algorithmic handwriting analysis of the Samaria inscriptions illuminates bureaucratic apparatus in biblical Israel". PLOS ONE. 15 (1) e0227452. Bibcode:2020PLoSO..1527452F. doi:10.1371/journal.pone.0227452. ISSN 1932-6203. PMC 6975535. PMID 31968002.
- Finkelstein, Israel (2021). "Notes on the Date and Function of the Samaria Ostraca". Israel Exploration Journal. 71 (2): 162–179. ISSN 0021-2059. JSTOR 27194659.
- Kaufman, Ivan T. (1982). "The Samaria Ostraca: An Early Witness to Hebrew Writing". The Biblical Archaeologist. 45 (4): 229–239. doi:10.2307/3209768. ISSN 0006-0895.
- Mendel, Anat; Grosman, Leore (2013). "Unpublished Hebrew and Other Northwest Semitic Inscriptions from Samaria Studied with a 3-dimensional Imaging Technology". Kleine Untersuchungen zur Sprache des Alten Testaments und Seiner Umwelt. 15: 177–188.
- Na'aman, Nadav (2019). "A new appraisal of the Samaria Ostraca". Ugarit-Forschungen. 50: 259–272. ISSN 0342-2356.
- Nam, Roger S. (2012). "Power Relations in the Samaria Ostraca". Palestine Exploration Quarterly. 144 (3): 155–163.
- Noegel, Scott B. (2006). "The Samaria Ostraca" (PDF). In Chavalas, Mark William (ed.). The Ancient Near East: Historical Sources in Translation. John Wiley & Sons. pp. 396–399. ISBN 978-0-631-23580-4.
- Richelle, Matthieu (2022). "Old and New Readings in the Samaria Ostraca". Bulletin de l'Académie Belge pour l'Étude des Langues Anciennes et Orientales. 10–11: 379–413. doi:10.14428/babelao.vol1011.2022.65023. hdl:2078.1/258860. ISSN 2034-9491.
- Rollston, Christopher (2021). "Food in Epigraphic Sources". In Fu, Janling; Shafer-Elliott, Cynthia; Meyers, Carol (eds.). T&T Clark Handbook of Food in the Hebrew Bible and Ancient Israel. T&T Clark. pp. 467–480. ISBN 9780567679802.
- Shea, William H. (1977). "The Date and Significance of the Samaria Ostraca". Israel Exploration Journal. 27 (1): 16–27.
- Tappy, Ron E. (2016). The Archaeology of the Ostraca House at Israelite Samaria: Epigraphic Discoveries in Complicated Contexts. American Schools of Oriental Research. ISBN 978-0-89757-095-4.
