= An-Nassariya =

an-Nassariya
- Municipality type D (Village council)

Arabic transcription(s)
  - Arabic: النصارية
  - Latin: an-Naseriya (official)
- Location of an-Nassariya within Palestine
- Coordinates: 32°14′37.60″N 35°23′30.91″E
- State: State of Palestine
- Governorate: Nablus

Government
  - Type: Village council

Population (2017)
  - Total: 1,889

an-Nassariya (Arabic: النصارية) is a Palestinian town in the Nablus Governorate in the North central West Bank, located 14 kilometers East of Nablus. According to the Palestinian Central Bureau of Statistics (PCBS), the village had a population of 1,889 inhabitants in 2017. The healthcare facilities for the surrounding villages are based in an-Nassariya, and the facilities are designated as MOH level 2.
