= Beit Hasan =

- Municipality type C

Arabic transcription(s)
  - Arabic: بيت حسان
  - Latin: Bayt Hasan (unofficial)
- Location of Beit Hasan within Palestine
- Coordinates: 32°14′15″N 35°24′13″E
- Palestine grid: 188/182
- State: State of Palestine
- Governorate: Nablus

Government
  - Type: Municipality

Population (2017)
  - Total: 1,599

Beit Hasan (Arabic: بيت حسان) is a Palestinian village in the Nablus Governorate in the North central West Bank, located 14 kilometers east of Nablus. According to the Palestinian Central Bureau of Statistics (PCBS), the village had a population of 1,599 inhabitants in 2017.
