= Nablus Governorate =

Governorate of Palestine

Coordinates: 32°14′26″N 35°17′13.50″E

- Governorate
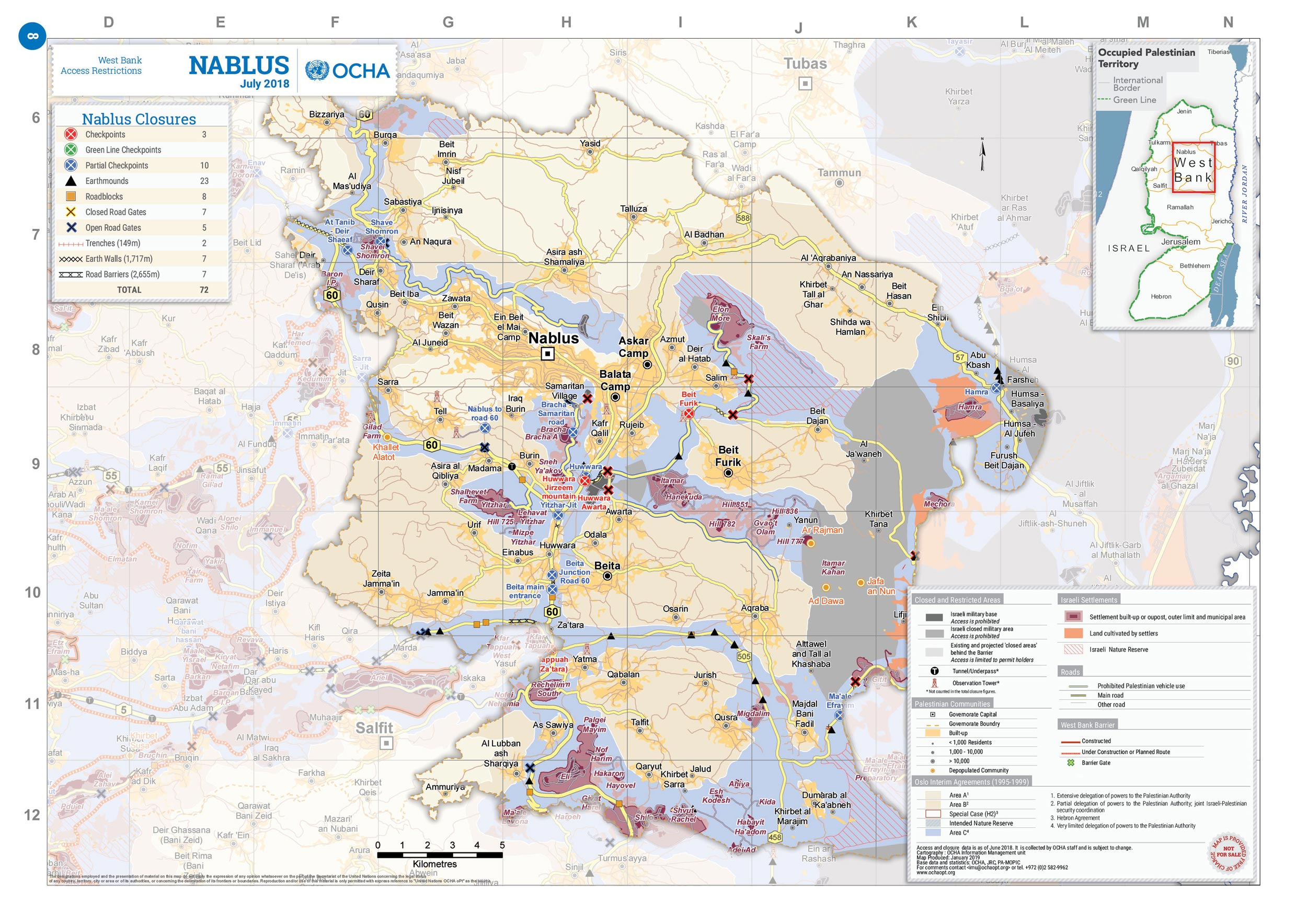
- 2018 United Nations map of the area, showing the Israeli occupation arrangements in the governorate

- Interactive map of Nablus Governorate
- Country: Palestine

Area
  - Total: 592 km^{2} (229 sq mi)

Population (2017)
  - Total: 388,321
- This figure excludes the Israeli West Bank Settlements

The Nablus Governorate (Arabic: محافظة نابلس, romanized: Muḥāfaẓat Nāblus) is an administrative district of Palestine located in the Central Highlands of the West Bank, 53 km north of Jerusalem. It covers the area around the city of Nablus which serves as the muhfaza (seat) of the governorate. The governor of the district is Mahmoud Aloul.

== History ==
During the Ottoman period, the region later forming the Nablus Governorate belonged to Jabal Nablus. Like other regions of Nablus' peripheral hinterland, it followed the provincial center, led by a closely knit web of economic, social and political relations between Nablus’ urban notables and the city’s surroundings. With the help of rural trading partners, these urban notables established trading monopolies that transformed Jabal Nablus’ autarkic economy into an export-driven market, shipping vast quantities of cash crops and finished goods to off-shore markets. Increasing demand for these commodities in the Ottoman Empire’s urban centers and in Europe spurred demographic growth and settlement expansion in the lowlands surrounding Jabal Nablus.

During the first six months of the First Intifada 85 people were killed in Nablus Governorate by the Israeli army. This was the highest total of all the West Bank Governorates.

== Municipalities ==
=== Cities ===
- Nablus

=== Towns ===
The following localities have populations over 4,000 and municipal councils of 11-15 members.

- Aqraba
- Asira ash-Shamaliya
- Beita
- Huwara
- Jammain
- Qabalan
- Sebastia
- Beit Furik

=== Village councils ===
The following localities have populations above 1,000 and village councils of 3 to 9 members.

- Asira al-Qibliya
- Azmut
- Awarta
- Al-Badhan
- Balata al-Balad
- Beit Dajan
- Beit Hasan
- Beit Iba
- Beit Imrin
- Beit Wazan
- Bizziriya
- Burin
- Burqa
- Deir al-Hatab
- Deir Sharaf
- Duma
- Einabus
- Furush Beit Dajan
- Ijnisinya
- Jurish
- Kafr Qallil
- Al-Lubban ash-Sharqiya
- Majdal Bani Fadil
- An-Naqura
- An-Naseriya
- Odala
- Osarin
- Qaryut
- Qusin
- Qusra
- Rujeib
- Salim
- Sarra
- As-Sawiya
- Talfit
- Talluza
- Tell
- Urif
- Yanun
- Yasid
- Yatma
- Zawata
- Zeita Jammain

== Refugee camps ==
- Askar
- Balata
- Ein Beit al-Ma'

== See also ==
- Governorates of Palestine

== Sources ==
- Administrative divisions in the Palestinian Territories
- Nablus Governorate Website
