= Al-Badhan =

al-Badhan
- Municipality type D (Village council)

Arabic transcription(s)
  - Arabic: الباذان
  - Latin: al-Badhan (official) al-Badan (unofficial)
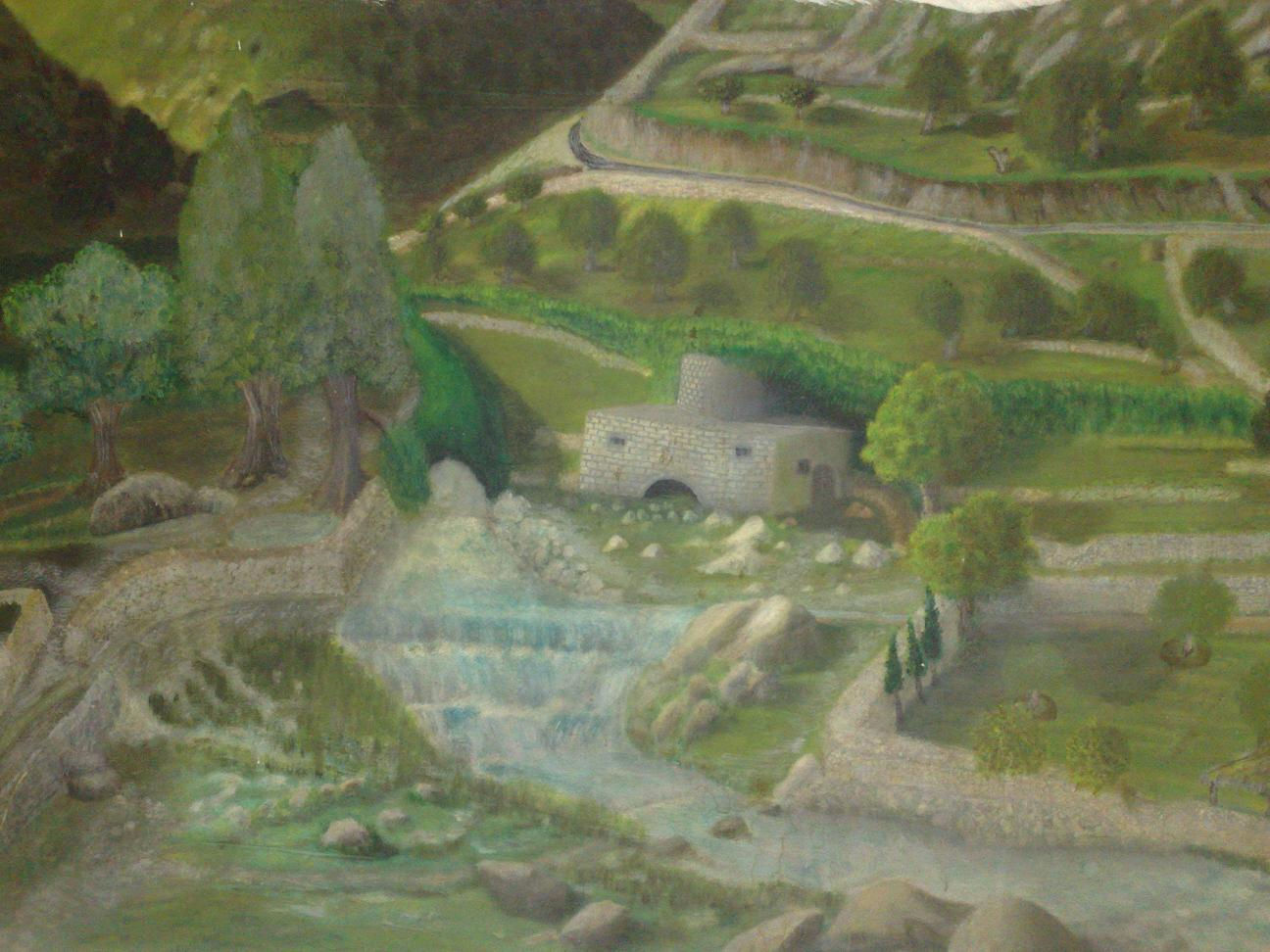
- Painting of Badhan

- Location of al-Badhan within Palestine
- Coordinates: 32°15′42″N 35°19′41″E
- Palestine grid: 180/185
- State: State of Palestine
- Governorate: Nablus

Government
  - Type: Village council

Population (2017)
  - Total: 3,171

al-Badhan (Arabic: الباذان) is a Palestinian village in the Nablus Governorate in the North central West Bank, located 7.28 kilometres (4.52 mi) northeast of Nablus, and 1.5 kilometres (0.93 mi) to the north of Elon Moreh. According to the Palestinian Central Bureau of Statistics (PCBS), the village had a population of 3,171 inhabitants in 2017.

The adjacent valley, Wadi al-Badhan (also known as Wadi Sajour), is a picturesque natural area located 5 km northeast of Nablus on the road leading to the Jordan Valley. The area is characterized by abundant springs and diversity of wildlife. The area is considered one of the most beautiful natural areas in the West Bank and has a nature reserve to preserve wildlife.

At the time of Roman and Byzantine rule, the nearby ruin of Khirbet Ferwe was home to the Samaritan town of Baddan, which was well-known for its pomegranates.

== History ==
Al-Badhan has several sites of archaeological interest including 12 ancient watermills.

Scholars today hold that al-Badhan is to be identified with the Badan (Hebrew: בדן; באדן) citied in the 2nd-century CE Mishnah and Tosefta, said to be a place then settled by Samaritans and renowned for its pomegranates. Badan is featured prominently in Samaritan tradition; According to one of these, the Israelites purified themselves at Badan after crossing the Jordan River and on their way to Mount Gerizim. The ancient site was located in Khirbet Ferwe, and a Herodian tomb was discovered at the site.

=== Ottoman period ===
Victor Guérin passed through the region in 1870, where he described its geographical features.

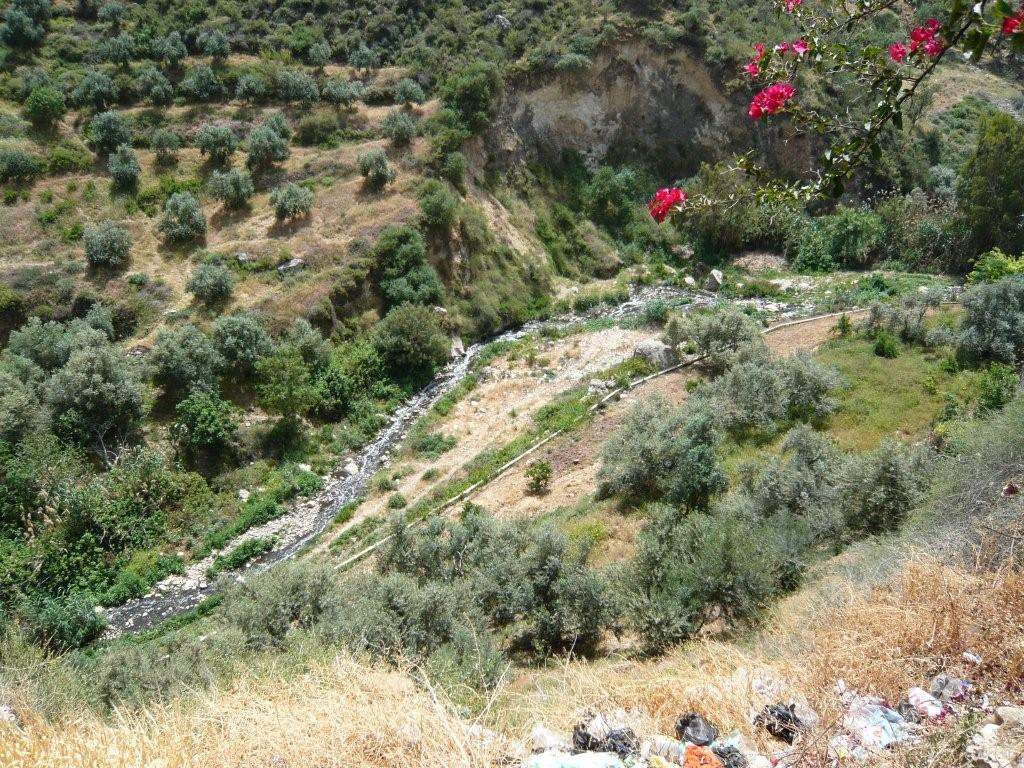
The riverine brook Wadi al-Badhan

=== Jordanian era ===
In the wake of the 1948 Arab–Israeli War, and after the 1949 Armistice Agreements, Badhan came under Jordanian rule.

The Jordanian census of 1961 found 446 inhabitants.

=== 1967, aftermath ===
Since the Six-Day War in 1967, al-Badhan has been under Israeli occupation. The Oslo II Accord, signed in 1995, divided the Israeli-occupied West Bank into three administrative divisions: Areas A, B and C. According to ARIJ, al-Badhan's village land is divided into 30% Area A, while the remaining 70% is defined as Area B.

Since 2003, al-Badhan has been governed by a Village Council which is currently administrated by 10 members appointed by the Palestinian National Authority (PNA).

== Flora and fauna ==
The geographical region lies on the Irano-Turanian border, and its slopes support vegetation grown in that broad region. Typical for this region are maquis, the dense scrub vegetation consisting of hardy evergreen shrubs and small trees, characteristic of coastal regions in the Mediterranean and which, in this area, are found on the cliffs' step-crevices. The kermes oak (Quercus coccifera) is common.

In contrast to the Galilee and the Judean Mountains, there are very few remnants of natural vegetation in the Samaria Mountains. Large areas in the south and west of Samaria and in the valleys have been cultivated for many generations as agricultural land and are planted mainly with olive, fig, almond and pomegranate trees; the areas in the valleys are used for arable land or vegetable crops. Only on the edges of the fields and in places that have been regenerated and where damaging the plant-life is prohibited by law have remnants of natural vegetation been preserved.

The wildlife of Samaria, as in other regions of the country, consists of populations that invaded the general area at different times and adapted to the conditions prevailing in the area. Hunting (with the introduction of modern firearms in the 20th-century) and extensive farming have been the principal causes for a decline in the area's natural wildlife. The animals that dominate the general area have their origins in the Mediterranean basin and in Europe, such as the badger, the wild boar, the red fox, the hedgehog, the field mouse, and the mole (among mammals).

== Bibliography ==
- Amar, Z. (2015). Flora and Fauna in Maimonides' Teachings. Kfar Darom. OCLC 783455868
- Conder, C.R.; Kitchener, H.H. (1882). The Survey of Western Palestine: Memoirs of the Topography, Orography, Hydrography, and Archaeology. Vol. 2. London: Committee of the Palestine Exploration Fund.
- Danby, H. (1933). The Mishnah. Oxford University Press. ISBN 0-19-815402-X.
- Government of Jordan, Department of Statistics (1964). First Census of Population and Housing. Volume I: Final Tables; General Characteristics of the Population (PDF).
- Guérin, V. (1874). Description Géographique Historique et Archéologique de la Palestine (in French). Vol. 2: Samarie, pt. 1. Paris: L'Imprimerie Nationale.
- Palmer, E.H. (1881). The Survey of Western Palestine: Arabic and English Name Lists Collected During the Survey by Lieutenants Conder and Kitchener, R. E. Transliterated and Explained by E.H. Palmer. Committee of the Palestine Exploration Fund.
