= Furush Beit Dajan =

Village in State of Palestine

- Municipality type D (Village council)

Arabic transcription(s)
  - Arabic: فروش بيت دجن
  - Latin: Froush Beit Dajan (official); Furush Bayt Dajan (unofficial)
- Location of Furush Beit Dajan within Palestine
- Coordinates: 32°11′6″N 35°27′15″E
- Palestine grid: 191/179
- State: State of Palestine
- Governorate: Nablus

Government
  - Type: Village council

Population (2017)
  - Total: 723

Furush Beit Dajan (Arabic: فروش بيت دجن) is a Palestinian village in the northern West Bank, located 10 kilometers east of Nablus and a part of the Nablus Governorate. According to the Palestinian Central Bureau of Statistics, the village had a population of approximately 723 inhabitants in 2017.

== History ==
Most of Furush Beit Dajan's residents are Bedouins or descendants of Bedouins who migrated from the village of Yattir in the Negev desert after being evicted by Israeli authorities in 1952. Most have abandoned their nomadic lifestyle and have adapted to farming. However, many still herd sheep and goats to the north of the village where there is a natural grazing area. Furush Beit Dajan receives most of its water from springs in the southern part of the village.

=== Post-1967 ===
After the Six-Day War in 1967, Furush Beit Dajan has been under Israeli occupation.

After the 1995 accords, 100% of village land, that is 20,083 dunams, has been defined as Area C territory.

Israel has confiscated 1,370 dunams of Furush Beit Dajan's land for the Israeli settlement of Hamra, Bik'at HaYarden, in addition to taking 192 dunams for a military checkpoint close to the settlement.
