= Surra, Azerbaijan =

Surra, Azerbaijan may refer to:

- Surra, Davachi, Azerbaijan
- Surra, Sabirabad, Azerbaijan
- Aşağı Surra, Azerbaijan
