= Surra (disambiguation) =

Surra may refer to:

- Surra, a disease
- Surra, Kuwait, a district
- Surra, Davachi, Azerbaijan
- Surra, Sabirabad, Azerbaijan
- Sarra, Nablus, older name of Sarra
