= Jit, Qalqilya =

Town in the West Bank, Palestine

Jit
- Municipality type D (Village council)

Arabic transcription(s)
  - Arabic: جيت
  - Latin: Jit (official)
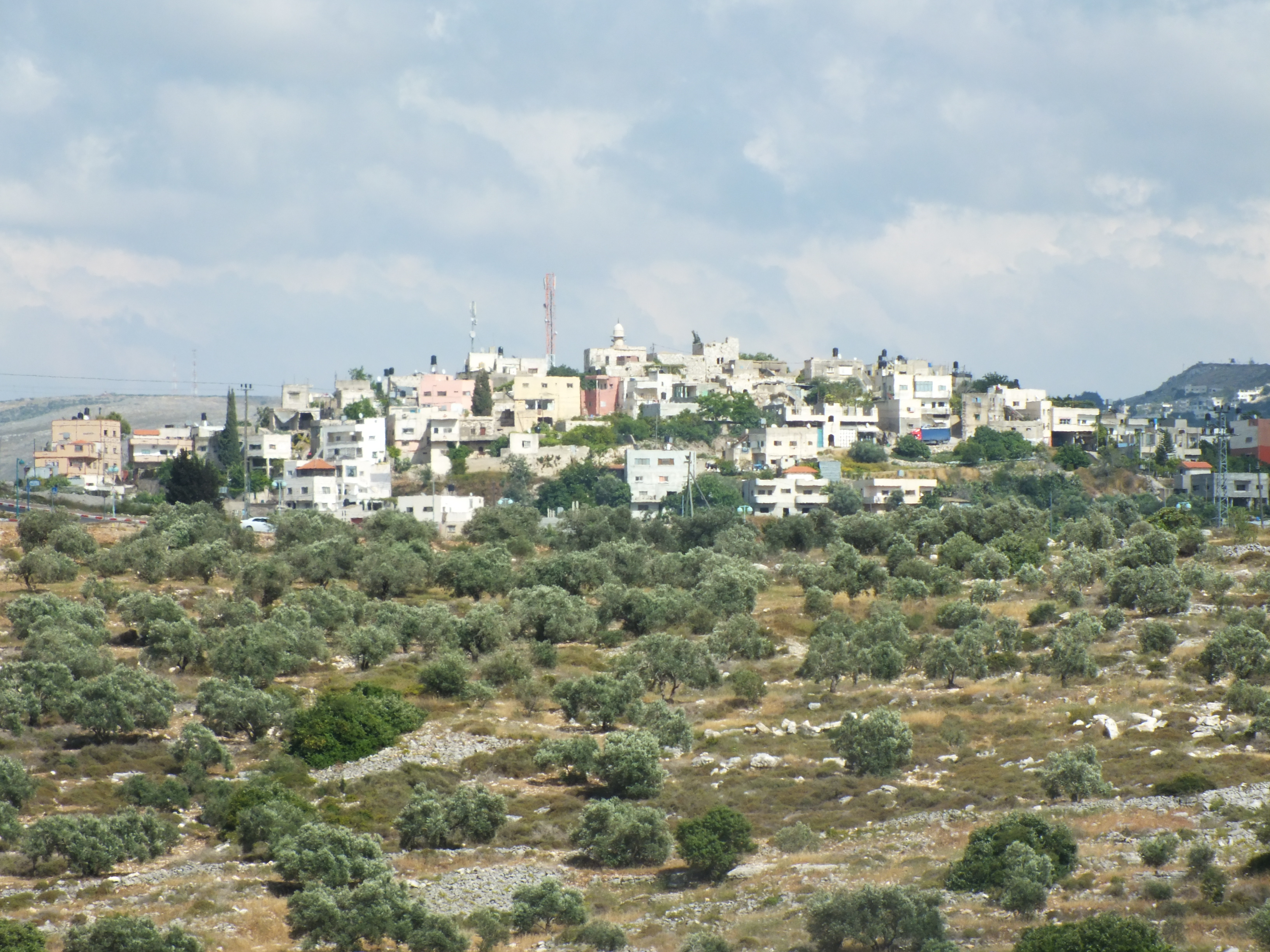
- Jit, 2013

- Location of Jit within Palestine
- Coordinates: 32°12′53″N 35°10′11″E
- Palestine grid: 166/180
- State: State of Palestine
- Governorate: Qalqilya

Government
  - Type: Village council
- Elevation: 501 m (1,644 ft)

Population (2017)
  - Total: 2,405
- Name meaning: Kuryet Jit, the town of Jit

Jit (Arabic: جيت, romanized: Jīt) is a Palestinian town in the northern West Bank, located 10 kilometers (6.2 mi) west of Nablus. According to the Palestinian Central Bureau of Statistics, the village had a population of 2,405 inhabitants in 2017.

== Location ==
Jit is located 19.7 kilometers (12.2 mi) (horizontally) north-east of Qalqilya. It is bordered by Sarra and Beit Iba to the east, Fara'ata and Immatain to the south, Kafr Qaddum to the west, and Qusin to the north. Also nearby are the Israeli settlements of Eli and Kedumim, and the Israeli outpost of Havat Gilad is south of Jit along Route 60. Jit is adjacent to Jit Junction, which is the intersection of Route 55 and 60. However, Route 55 has been closed to Palestinian travellers going westward from Jit since 2003 due to the expansion of Kedumim across the highway.

== History ==
No Byzantine remains have been found in Jit. Therefore, historical geographer Ellenblum suggested that the early Muslim inhabitants came there as a result of migration rather than conversion. However, in 2011, two reliefs of menorahs dating from the Byzantine period, probably of Samaritan origin, were discovered in Jit.

The Tolidah records the dwelling of a Samaritan called Abraham son of Sahaba Ṭabba son of Yahushuʿa son of Abraham son of Rumam from the Bene Yahushuʿa b. Gidʿun in the village, recording its ancient name as Qaryat Gay' (קרית גיא).

Islamic scholar Diya al-Din (1173–1245) mentions the presence of Muslims in Jit during his lifetime, and also says that followers of Ibn Qudamah lived there.

=== Ottoman era ===
In 1517, the village was included in the Ottoman Empire with the rest of Palestine, and in the 1596 tax records it appeared as Jit Jammal, located in the Nahiya of Jabal Qubal of the Liwa of Nablus. The population was 50 households, all Muslim. They paid a fixed tax rate of 33.3% on agricultural products, such as wheat, barley, summer crops, olive trees, goats and beehives, a press for olive oil or grape syrup, in addition to occasional revenues and a fixed tax for people of Nablus area; a total of 20,000 akçe.

A map from Napoleon's invasion of 1799 by Pierre Jacotin named it Qarihagi, (Quryet Jitt) as a village by the road from Jaffa to Nablus.

In 1838, Kuryet Jit was noted as a village located in the District of Jurat 'Amra, south of Nablus.

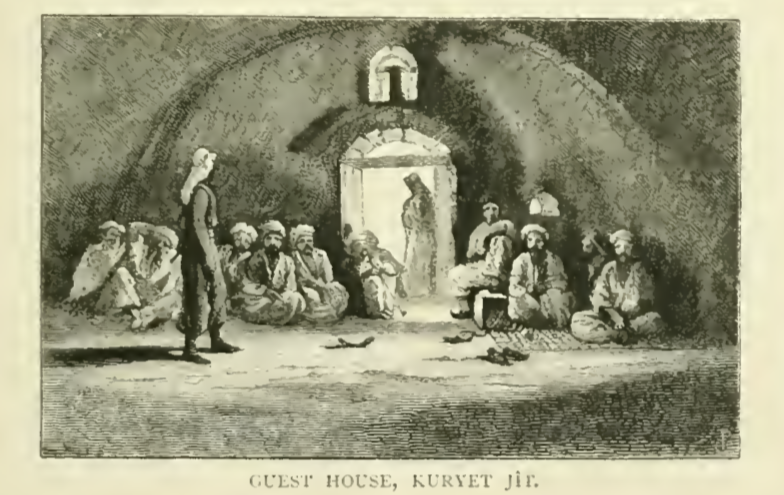
Madafeh, or guesthouse, in Jit in the late 18th hundred

In 1870, Victor Guérin noted between seven hundred and fifty and eight hundred people in the village. Also, "here Guérin observed among the houses a certain number of cut stones of apparent antiquity. Many of the houses are in a ruinous condition, others are completely destroyed. On the north-west side of the hill he found a great well, into which one descends by fifteen steps, now fallen to pieces. It gives a supply of water which never fails. The place is probably the old Gitta mentioned by Justin Martyr and Eusebius as the birthplace of Simon the Magician."

In 1870/1871 (1288 AH), an Ottoman census listed the village in the nahiya (sub-district) of Jamma'in al-Thani, subordinate to Nablus.

In 1882, the PEF's Survey of Western Palestine (SWP) described Kuryet Jit as: "A well-built stone village with a high house in it, standing on a knoll by the main road, surrounded with olives; it has a well to the west; the inhabitants are remarkable for their courtesy, this part of the country and all the district west of it being little visited by tourists."

=== British Mandate era ===
In the 1922 census of Palestine conducted by the British Mandate authorities, Qariyet Jit had a population of 285 Muslims, increasing in the 1931 census to 289 Muslims, in 70 houses.

In the 1945 statistics the population of Jit was 440 (all Muslim), while the total land area was 6,461 dunams, according to an official land and population survey. Of this, 816 were allocated for plantations and irrigable land, 3,915 for cereals, while 61 dunams were classified as built-up (urban) areas.

=== Jordanian era ===
In the wake of the 1948 Arab–Israeli War, and after the 1949 Armistice Agreements, Jit came under Jordanian rule. It was annexed by Jordan in 1950.

The Jordanian census of 1961 found 660 inhabitants.

=== Post-1967 ===
Since the Six-Day War in 1967, Jit has been under Israeli occupation.

After the 1995 accords, 14% of village land was classified as Area B, the remaining 86% as Area C. Israel has confiscated village land for the Israeli settlements of Giv'at HaMerkaziz and Mitzpe Yishai, both part of the Kedumim settlement. According to the Israeli plans of 2013, 1,150 dunums (18.1% of the village's total area) will be isolated from the village behind the Israeli barrier wall.

Reports have been made about Israeli settlers from Kedumim stealing the olive harvest from the farmers of Jit.

==== 2024 pogrom ====
On 15 August 2024, towards dusk, a group of dozens of masked Israeli settlers, armed with Kalashnikovs, M16s, and stones attacked the village. Local Palestinian estimates put the figure of rampaging settlers at over 100. A call from the local mosque asked youths to rally and defend the village. The settlers fired guns, threw rocks, and hurled Molotov cocktails at civilians, and torched the villagers' houses and cars. One Palestinian civilian who responded to the call to defend the village, Rasheed Seda (23), was killed when a settler shot him in the chest, and another was critically wounded. The IDF stated that it had arrived within a half an hour and had removed Israeli citizens from Jit after firing shots in the air. According to the Palestinians, the IDF had shown up an hour after the rampage began. The IDF detained one Israeli - later released as uninvolved in the attack - for interference. Overall, four homes and six private vehicles were torched. Local eyewitnesses stated that the attackers came from the settlement of Eli. The attack was one of 1,250 on Palestinians conducted by Israeli settlers Palestinians since 7 October 2023, according to OCHA.

The attack was condemned by Israeli Prime Minister Benjamin Netanyahu and Israeli President Isaac Herzog described it a "pogrom". A US National Security Council spokesperson stated, "Attacks by violent settlers against Palestinian civilians in the West Bank are unacceptable and must stop". The UN human rights office called the killing "horrific" and stated it "was not an isolated attack".

== Demography ==
During the Ottoman and British Mandate period, some of Jit's residents relocated to the villages of Shuweika, Qaqun, Bal'a, Anabta, Umm al-Fahm and Zeita.

== Bibliography ==
- Barron, J.B., ed. (1923). Palestine: Report and General Abstracts of the Census of 1922. Government of Palestine.
- Conder, C.R.; Kitchener, H.H. (1882). The Survey of Western Palestine: Memoirs of the Topography, Orography, Hydrography, and Archaeology. Vol. 2. London: Committee of the Palestine Exploration Fund.
- Drory, Joseph (1988). "Hanbalis of the Nablus Region in the Eleventh and Twelfth Centuries". Asian and African Studies. 22: 93–112. Archived from the original on 1 March 2018.
- Ellenblum, R. (2003). Frankish Rural Settlement in the Latin Kingdom of Jerusalem. Cambridge University Press. ISBN 9780521521871.
- Government of Jordan, Department of Statistics (1964). First Census of Population and Housing. Volume I: Final Tables; General Characteristics of the Population (PDF).
- Government of Palestine, Department of Statistics (1945). Village Statistics, April, 1945.
- Guérin, V. (1875). Description Géographique Historique et Archéologique de la Palestine (in French). Vol. 2: Samarie, pt. 2. Paris: L'Imprimerie Nationale.
- Hadawi, S. (1970). Village Statistics of 1945: A Classification of Land and Area ownership in Palestine. Palestine Liberation Organization Research Center.
- Hütteroth, W.-D.; Abdulfattah, K. (1977). Historical Geography of Palestine, Transjordan and Southern Syria in the Late 16th Century. Erlanger Geographische Arbeiten, Sonderband 5. Erlangen, Germany: Vorstand der Fränkischen Geographischen Gesellschaft. ISBN 3-920405-41-2.
- Karmon, Y. (1960). "An Analysis of Jacotin's Map of Palestine" (PDF). Israel Exploration Journal. 10 (3, 4): 155–173, 244–253. Archived from the original (PDF) on 22 December 2019.
- Mills, E., ed. (1932). Census of Palestine 1931. Population of Villages, Towns and Administrative Areas. Jerusalem: Government of Palestine.
- Palmer, E.H. (1881). The Survey of Western Palestine: Arabic and English Name Lists Collected During the Survey by Lieutenants Conder and Kitchener, R. E. Transliterated and Explained by E.H. Palmer. Committee of the Palestine Exploration Fund.
- Robinson, E.; Smith, E. (1841). Biblical Researches in Palestine, Mount Sinai and Arabia Petraea: A Journal of Travels in the year 1838. Vol. 3. Boston: Crocker & Brewster.
