= Beit Wazan =

- Municipality type C

Arabic transcription(s)
  - Arabic: بيت وزن
  - Latin: Beit Wazan (official); Bayt Wazan (unofficial)
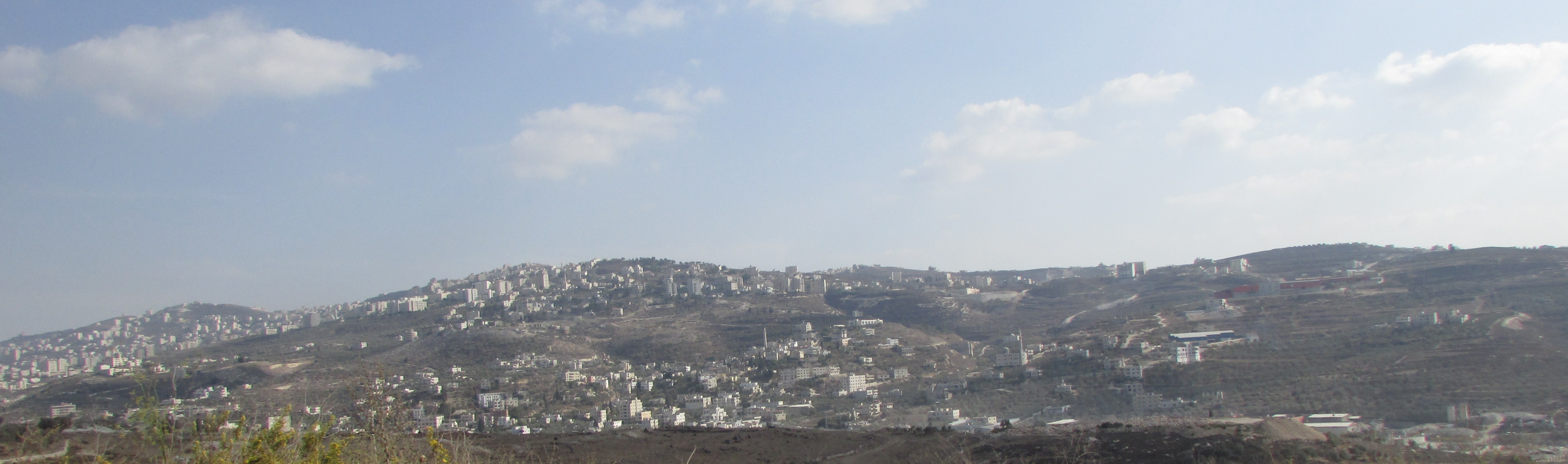
- Beit Wazan to the right

- Location of Beit Wazan within Palestine
- Coordinates: 32°13′53″N 35°12′57″E
- Palestine grid: 170/181
- State: State of Palestine
- Governorate: Nablus

Government
  - Type: Municipality

Population (2017)
  - Total: 1,312
- Name meaning: The house of Udhen

Beit Wazan (Arabic: بيت وزن) is a Palestinian village in the Nablus Governorate of the State of Palestine, in the northern West Bank, located 4.5 kilometers west of Nablus. According to the Palestinian Central Bureau of Statistics (PCBS), the village had a population of 1,312 inhabitants in 2017.

== Etymology ==
Beit Wazan translates from Arabic as "the house of Udhen". Alternatively, Udhen was also spelled "Uden", "Uzen", or "Awzan". Today, the local name is "Wazan". According to the village council of Beit Wazan, "Wazan" was the name of the wife of one of the village's former chiefs.

According to Ben-Zvi, the Samaritans call the village "Beit Zein", following a tradition according which seven Samaritan families in the village converted to Islam.

== Geography ==
Beit Wazan is situated on a slope and its average elevation is 563 meters above sea level. It is located 4.56 kilometers west of Nablus city. It is adjacent to the Juneid and the Rafidia neighborhoods of Nablus, both of which are to its south. Nearby localities include Beit Iba and Zawata to the north, Tell to the south, Sarra to the southwest and Qusin to the west.

== History ==
Archaeological findings indicate traces of Crusader settlement in Beit Wazan in the 12th century CE.

=== Ottoman era ===
Beit Wazan, like the rest of Palestine, was incorporated into the Ottoman Empire in 1517, and in the census of 1596 the village appeared under the name Bayt Awzan as being in the Nahiya (Subdistrict) of Jabal Qubal, part of Nablus Sanjak. It had a population of 52 families and 4 bachelors, all Muslim. They paid a fixed tax-rate of 33.3% on agricultural products, including wheat, barley, summer crops, olive trees, goats and bee-hives; vineyards and fruit trees, in addition to occasional revenues; a total of 13,000 akçe.

In the 17th century, members of the Arab Bani Ghazi tribe migrated to Beit Wazan from Transjordan. The Qasim branch of the tribe established itself at Beit Wazan, as well as Deir Istiya, as their throne village from which they exerted power in the Jamma'in subdistrict of Jabal Nablus. The village contained the Qasim clan's palace, built in 1820, and was heavily fortified. The chief of the clan in the early 19th century, Qasim al-Ahmad, was the leading commander of the countrywide 1834 Peasants' Revolt in Palestine. When the Egyptian governor Ibrahim Pasha defeated the rebels of Jabal Nablus, he had Beit Wazan destroyed. In 1838, Edward Robinson noted it under the name of Beit Uzin, part of the Jurat 'Amra district, south of Nablus.

In 1870/1871 (1288 AH), an Ottoman census listed the village with a population of 41 households in the nahiya (sub-district) of Jamma'in al-Awwal, subordinate to Nablus.

In 1882, the PEF's Survey of Western Palestine listed it as a village of the Jurat 'Amra subdistrict and called it Beit Udhen (Uden or Uzen). They described it as "a village rather smaller than Beit Iba, situated on the slope above it. It had a well on the east side, and a spring on the hill-side to the west." The residents of the village established commercial ties with the 'Asi family of Nablus in the late 19th and early 20th centuries. The people of Beit Wazan would sell 'Asi merchants onions for their stores in Nablus and the 'Asi would aid the people of Beit Wazan with commercial transactions in the city by negotiating prices down for goods, ranging from textile to copperware.

=== British Mandate era ===
Following the defeat of the Ottoman Empire in Palestine in 1917, the sheikhs living in the Qasim Palace abandoned it and moved to Nablus. The palace suffered severe damage as a result of the 1927 Jericho earthquake. It remained abandoned, although still owned by members of the Qasim clan. It is currently leased by the An-Najah National University of Nablus.

In the 1922 census of Palestine, during British Mandatory rule, Beit Wazan had a population of 270 Muslims, decreasing slightly to 253 in the 1931 census.

In a 1945 land survey, the village had 310 inhabitants, all Muslims, with 3,711 dunams of land, according to an official land and population survey. Of this, 730 dunams were plantations and irrigable land, 1,864 used for cereals, while 22 dunams were built-up land.

=== Jordanian era ===
In the wake of the 1948 Arab–Israeli War, and after the 1949 Armistice Agreements, Beit Wazan came under Jordanian rule.

In 1961, the population of Beit Wazan was 372 persons.

=== Post 1967 ===
Since the Six-Day War in 1967, Beit Wazan has been held under Israeli occupation.

After the 1995 accords, 81% of the village land was classified as Area A, while the remaining 19% was classified as Area B.

In 1997, a village council was established in Beit Wazan to administer local civil affairs. It operates in cooperation with the Joint Organizing Committee, which also includes the village councils of Beit Iba and Zawata. In the 1997 census by the Palestinian Central Bureau of Statistics (PCBS), Beit Wazan had a population of 837, of which 35 were Palestinian refugees.

In 2003, the Qasim Palace was renovated and was used by the university as its Urban and Regional Development Center. In 2010, the venue was used for a concert by the rap group DAM.

In the 2007 census, the village had a population 1,057 (518 males, 539 females) living in 207 households. The average family size was five members. The two largest families in Beit Wazan today are the Abu Eisheh and Abd al-Haq families.

== Demography ==
Beit Wazan is the center of the Qassam Ahmad family, who are the rulers of Jamma'in. Some of its residents have origins in Hebron.

== Bibliography ==
- Barron, J.B., ed. (1923). Palestine: Report and General Abstracts of the Census of 1922. Government of Palestine.
- Conder, C.R.; Kitchener, H.H. (1882). The Survey of Western Palestine: Memoirs of the Topography, Orography, Hydrography, and Archaeology. Vol. 2. London: Committee of the Palestine Exploration Fund.
- Doumani, B. (1995). Rediscovering Palestine: Merchants and Peasants in Jabal Nablus. University of California Press.
- Ellenblum, R. (2003). Frankish Rural Settlement in the Latin Kingdom of Jerusalem. Cambridge University Press. ISBN 9780521521871.
- Government of Jordan, Department of Statistics (1964). First Census of Population and Housing. Volume I: Final Tables; General Characteristics of the Population (PDF).
- Government of Palestine, Department of Statistics (1945). Village Statistics, April, 1945.
- Hadawi, S. (1970). Village Statistics of 1945: A Classification of Land and Area ownership in Palestine. Palestine Liberation Organization Research Center.
- Hütteroth, W.-D.; Abdulfattah, K. (1977). Historical Geography of Palestine, Transjordan and Southern Syria in the Late 16th Century. Erlanger Geographische Arbeiten, Sonderband 5. Erlangen, Germany: Vorstand der Fränkischen Geographischen Gesellschaft. ISBN 3-920405-41-2.
- Mills, E., ed. (1932). Census of Palestine 1931. Population of Villages, Towns and Administrative Areas. Jerusalem: Government of Palestine.
- Palmer, E.H. (1881). The Survey of Western Palestine: Arabic and English Name Lists Collected During the Survey by Lieutenants Conder and Kitchener, R. E. Transliterated and Explained by E.H. Palmer. Committee of the Palestine Exploration Fund.
- Robinson, E.; Smith, E. (1841). Biblical Researches in Palestine, Mount Sinai and Arabia Petraea: A Journal of Travels in the year 1838. Vol. 3. Boston: Crocker & Brewster.
- Schölch, A. (1993). Palestine in Transformation, 1856–1882 (PDF). Institute for Palestine Studies. ISBN 0-88728-234-2.
- Spyridon, S. N. (1938). "Annals of Palestine". Journal of the Palestine Oriental Society. XVIII: 65–111.
