= Battle of Beit Imrin =

- Part of 1936–1939 Arab revolt in Palestine
Date	29 September 1936
Location	Beit Imrin, Mandatory Palestine
Result	Rebels withdrew after a 10-hour clash

Belligerents
United Kingdom	Palestinian Arabs

Commanders and leaders
(United Kingdom) Arthur Wauchope	Fawzi al-Qawuqji

Units involved
British Army	Local rebels (Fasa'il)

Casualties and losses
Unknown	42 killed and 15 wounded

The Battle of Beit Imrin occurred on September 29, 1936 in Beit Imrin, when British forces besieged Arab forces operating under the command of Fawzi al-Qawuqji while in the village. The rebels withdrew after receiving heavy losses estimated at 42 dead.
