= Nisf Jubeil =

- Local Development Committee

Arabic transcription(s)
  - Arabic: نصف جبيل
  - Latin: Nisf Jbeil (official); Nisf Jubayl (unofficial)
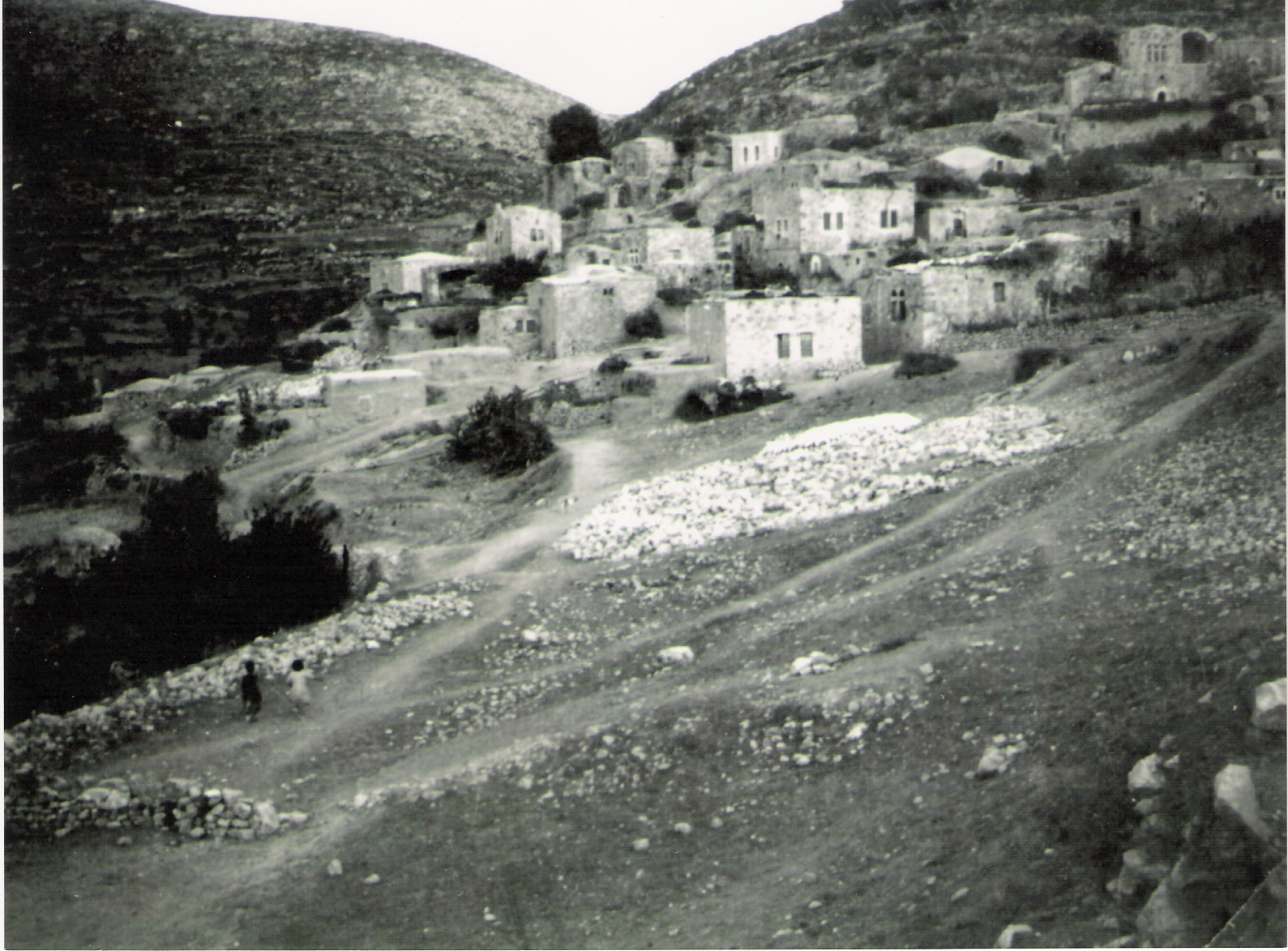
- Nifs Jubeil, 1936

- Location of Nisf Jubeil within Palestine
- Coordinates: 32°16′58″N 35°13′14″E
- Palestine grid: 170/187
- State: State of Palestine
- Governorate: Nablus

Government
  - Type: Local Development Committee
  - Head of Municipality: Adil Barakat

Population (2017)
  - Total: 471
- Name meaning: "The Watershed"

Nisf Jubeil (Arabic: نصف جبيل also spelled Nisf Jbeil or Nisf Jubayl) is a Palestinian village in the Nablus Governorate in the northern West Bank, located northwest of Nablus. According to the Palestinian Central Bureau of Statistics (PCBS) census, it had a population of 394 in 2007. There were a total of 83 households and 17 business establishments. By 2017, the population was 471.

== Geography ==
Nisf Jubeil is situated on a terrace along the Wadi Nib outlet of the Sebastiya Valley, with an approximate elevation of 400 meters above sea level. It is 2.5 kilometers east of the town of Sebastia. Other nearby localities include Ijnisinya to the south, Yasid to the east and Beit Imrin to the north. The nearby Ein Sharqiya spring serves as a source of water and there are 30 cisterns in the village.

== History ==
Sherds from the late Roman, Byzantine, early Muslim and Medieval eras have been found here.

=== Ottoman era ===
In 1596, Nisf Jubeil appeared in Ottoman tax registers as "Jubayl", a village in the nahiya of Jabal Sami in the liwa of Nablus. It had a population of 30 Muslim households and 36 Christian households. They paid a fixed tax-rate of 33.3% on agricultural products, including wheat, barley, summer crops, olive trees, goats and beehives; a total of 10,040 akçe. 1/3 of the revenues went to a Waqf.

In 1838 there were approximately 200 Christians, including a priest living in the village. The Christians were of the Greek Orthodox faith.

Victor Guérin found an ancient sarcophage in Nisf Jubeil, used as a trough. He estimated there were 300 inhabitants, including some Christians. In 1882, Nisf Jubeil was described as "a small village in an open valley, with a spring to the east and olives. Some of the inhabitants are Greek Christians."

In 1870/1871 (1288 AH), an Ottoman census listed the village in the nahiya (sub-district) of Wadi al-Sha'ir.

=== British Mandate era ===
In the 1922 census of Palestine conducted by the British Mandate of Palestine, its population was 162 (including 88 Christians), increasing to 210 (including 105 Christians) in the 1931 census.

In the 1945 statistics the population was 260; 80 Muslims and 180 Christians, while the total land area was recorded as 5,054 dunams. Of this, 890 dunams were plantations and irrigable land, 2,443 used for cereals, while 28 dunams were built-up land.

=== Jordanian era ===
In the wake of the 1948 Arab–Israeli War, and after the 1949 Armistice Agreements, Nisf Jubeil came under Jordanian rule.

In 1961, the population of Nisf Jubeil was 228, of whom 50 were Christian.

=== 1967-present ===
Since the Six-Day War in 1967, Nisf Jubeil has been under Israeli occupation, and according to the Israeli census of that year, the population of Nisf Jubeil stood at 221, of whom 14 were registered as having come from Israel.

In 1979 Nisf Jubeil's built-up area amounted to 25 dunams. Its village center contained a few old houses, two Greek Orthodox churches and a mosque, called the Nisf Jubeil Mosque. The mayor of the village is currently Adil Barakat. Nisf Jubeil has a mixed population of Christians and Muslims.

== Demography ==
=== Local origins ===
Some of the village's residents are Christians with origins in Transjordan. Others trace their origins to Burqa and Beit Imrin.

== Bibliography ==
- Barron, J.B., ed. (1923). Palestine: Report and General Abstracts of the Census of 1922. Government of Palestine.
- Conder, C.R.; Kitchener, H.H. (1882). The Survey of Western Palestine: Memoirs of the Topography, Orography, Hydrography, and Archaeology. Vol. 2. London: Committee of the Palestine Exploration Fund.
- Ellenblum, R. (2003). Frankish Rural Settlement in the Latin Kingdom of Jerusalem. Cambridge University Press. ISBN 9780521521871.
- Government of Jordan, Department of Statistics (1964). First Census of Population and Housing. Volume I: Final Tables; General Characteristics of the Population (PDF).
- Government of Palestine, Department of Statistics (1945). Village Statistics, April, 1945.
- Guérin, V. (1875). Description Géographique Historique et Archéologique de la Palestine (in French). Vol. 2: Samarie, pt. 2. Paris: L'Imprimerie Nationale.
- Hadawi, S. (1970). Village Statistics of 1945: A Classification of Land and Area ownership in Palestine. Palestine Liberation Organization Research Center.
- Hütteroth, W.-D.; Abdulfattah, K. (1977). Historical Geography of Palestine, Transjordan and Southern Syria in the Late 16th Century. Erlanger Geographische Arbeiten, Sonderband 5. Erlangen, Germany: Vorstand der Fränkischen Geographischen Gesellschaft. ISBN 3-920405-41-2.
- Mills, E., ed. (1932). Census of Palestine 1931. Population of Villages, Towns and Administrative Areas. Jerusalem: Government of Palestine.
- Palmer, E.H. (1881). The Survey of Western Palestine: Arabic and English Name Lists Collected During the Survey by Lieutenants Conder and Kitchener, R. E. Transliterated and Explained by E.H. Palmer. Committee of the Palestine Exploration Fund.
- Petersen, Andrew (2005). The Towns of Palestine Under Muslim Rule. British Archaeological Reports. ISBN 1841718211.
- Robinson, E.; Smith, E. (1841). Biblical Researches in Palestine, Mount Sinai and Arabia Petraea: A Journal of Travels in the year 1838. Vol. 3. Boston: Crocker & Brewster.
- Zertal, A. (2004). The Manasseh Hill Country Survey. Vol. 1. Boston: BRILL. ISBN 9004137564.
