= Shavei Shomron =

Israeli settlement in the West Bank

Shavei Shomron: שָׁבֵי שׁוֹמְרוֹן (Hebrew)
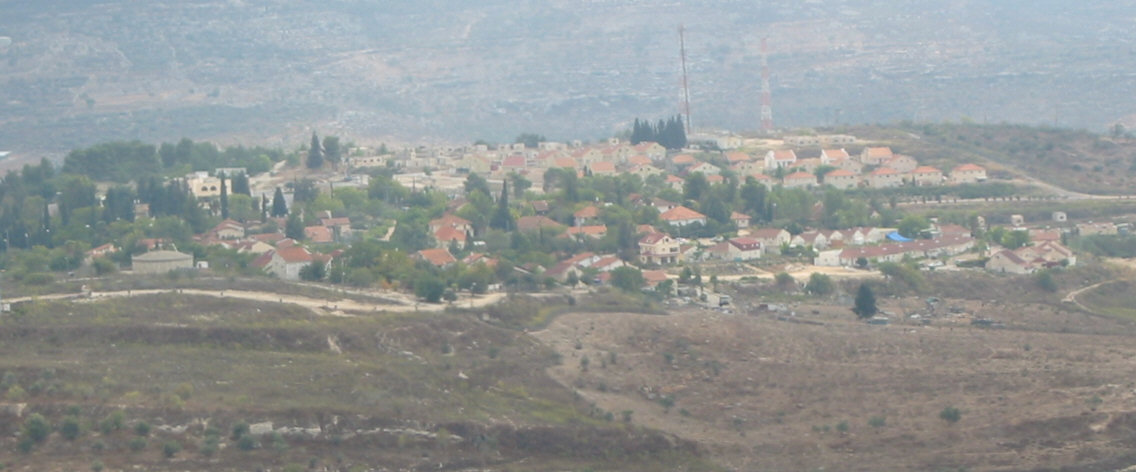
- Etymology: Returnees of Samaria
- Location within the Northern West Bank
- Coordinates: 32°15′51″N 35°11′6″E
- Country: Palestine
- District: Judea and Samaria Area
- Council: Shomrom
- Region: West Bank
- Affiliation: Amana
- Founded: 1977
- Founder: Amana
- Population (2024): 1,077
- Website: shavey-shomron.co.il

A Turkish mosque stands in the middle of the town, a unique distinction among Israeli settlements (though Homesh and Sa-Nur were similarly endowed before their 2005 evacuation). The mosque's dome has been temporarily removed for repairs.

Shavei Shomron (Hebrew: שָׁבֵי שׁוֹמְרוֹן, lit. Returnees of Samaria) is an Israeli settlement in the northern West Bank. Built on lands confiscated from the neighboring Palestinian villages of An-Naqura and Deir Sharaf, it is located to the west of Nablus, on the road to Tulkarm. It is organised as a community settlement and falls under the jurisdiction of Shomron Regional Council. In 2024 it had a population of 1,077, mostly religious Zionist and Modern Orthodox Jews. Its municipal jurisdiction is 664 dunams, of which 272 dunams are built up.

The international community considers Israeli settlements in the West Bank illegal under international law, but the Israeli government disputes this.

== History ==
In late 1976, supporters of the Gush Emunim (Bloc of the Faithful) staged a takeover of the abandoned Sebastia railroad station, located outside an Arab village of the same name. The location is in proximity to the ruins of Samaria, the capital city of the northern Kingdom of Israel, built by King Omri. Using this as justification to secure the Israeli claim to the region, the demonstrators demanded that settlement be initiated in this region. With the support of newly elected Prime Minister Menachem Begin, a residential community was built the following year alongside a military base at a strategically valuable crossroads by residents of nearby Netanya, and with the assistance of the Amana settlement organisation.

According to ARIJ, Israel confiscated land from two nearby Palestinian villages in order to construct Shavei Shomron: 680 dunums of land were taken from An-Naqura, while 236 dunums were taken from Deir Sharaf.

On 11 October 2022, an Israeli soldier was shot dead by Palestinian gunmen in the settlement. The Palestinian group the Lions' Den claimed responsibility.

=== Intifada and disengagement ===
Like all Israeli settlers, the residents of Shavei Shomron traveled through and conducted business in Nablus and neighboring Arab villages. However, as tensions increased following the First Intifada, Israeli travel to Nablus was restricted, and new roads were built to bypass certain villages. Twenty-four hundred dunums were confiscated from Palestinian villages to build a bypass road from Shavei Shomron to the Mt. Ibal military installation. In 2002, the Israeli Supreme Court approved the construction of part of the West Bank barrier around the community. Many local residents opposed its construction, fearing that it may become a future border between Israel and a Palestinian state. Others were concerned that an incident like the one earlier in the year, when a terrorist infiltrated the community and targeted the kindergarten with grenades and firearms before being shot by a local resident, could be repeated without such measures.

In August 2005, the community hosted mass demonstrations in opposition to the Israeli disengagement from Gaza, which included the forced evacuation of four settlements to the north of Shavei Shomron, and brought a potential frontier to the settlement's backyard. Following their evacuation and demolition, the community hosted some of the former residents of Homesh and Sa-Nur.

As of 2008, residents of Shavei Shomron were being trained by Mishmeret Yesha in counterterrorism tactics and the use of guns.

== Demographics ==
The community has a swimming pool and ulpan (Hebrew classes) for newcomers which serve to attract a population including many olim (Jewish immigrants) from English-speaking countries as well as Russian Jews from the former USSR, Yemenite Jews, Bnei Menashe, and some Incan Jewish families from Trujillo, Peru that converted to Orthodox Judaism.

== Notable residents ==
- Limor Son Har-Melech (born 1979), member of the Knesset for the Otzma Yehudit party since 2022
