= Deir Sharaf =

- Municipality type D (Village council)

Arabic transcription(s)
  - Arabic: دير شرف
  - Latin: Dayr Sharaf (official)
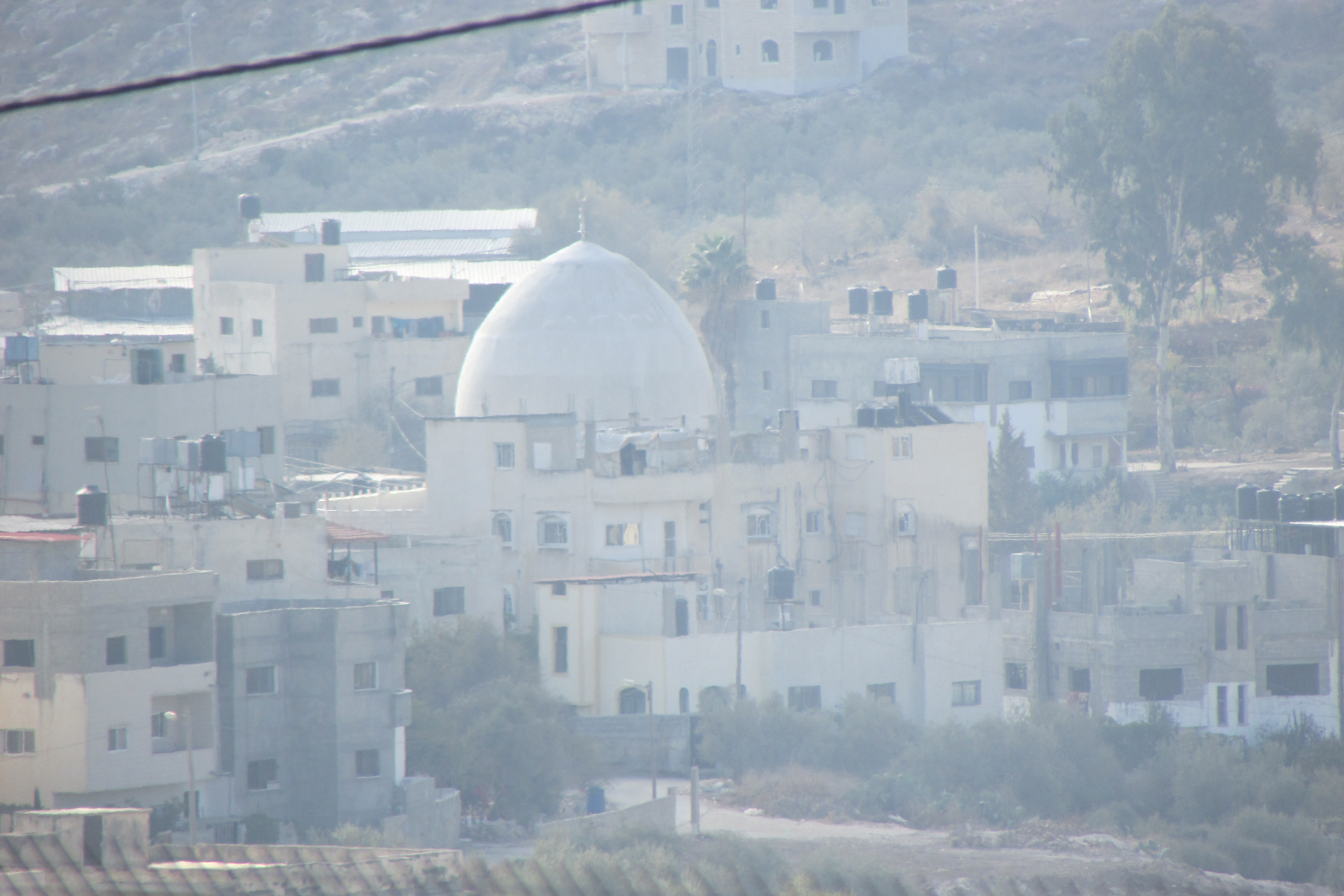
- Deir Sharaf

- Location of Deir Sharaf within Palestine
- Coordinates: 32°15′15″N 35°11′17″E
- Palestine grid: 168/184
- State: State of Palestine
- Governorate: Nablus

Government
  - Type: Village council

Population (2017)
  - Total: 2,949
- Name meaning: The Monastery of the Nobles

Deir Sharaf (Arabic: دير شرف) is a Palestinian town in the Nablus Governorate of the State of Palestine, in the northern West Bank, located northwest of Nablus. According to the Palestinian Central Bureau of Statistics (PCBS), the town had a population of 2,949 inhabitants in 2017.

== Location ==
Deir Sharaf is located 7.8 kilometers (4.8 mi) northwest of Nablus. It is bordered by An Naqura, Beit Iba, and Sabastiya to the east, Burqa and Ramin to the north, Beit Lid to the west, and Qusin to the south.

== History ==
Pottery sherds from the Iron Age II, Byzantine, early Muslim and Medieval era have been found here.

=== Ottoman era ===
Deir Sharaf, like the rest of Palestine, was incorporated into the Ottoman Empire in 1517, and in the census of 1596 it was a part of the nahiya ("subdistrict") of Jabal Sami, which was part of the Sanjak of Nablus. The village had a population of 55 households, all Muslim. The villagers paid a fixed tax rate of 33.3% on wheat, barley, summer crops, olive trees, beehives and/or goats, in addition to occasional revenues, a press for olive oil or grape syrup, and a tax on Muslims in the Nablus area; a total of 9,372 akçe. The whole of the revenue went to a Waqf for the Madrasa of Ramla.

In 1838, Deir Sheraf was located in the Wady esh-Sha'ir District, west of Nablus.

In 1870, Victor Guérin noted “a small square in front of the mosque paved by ancient slabs” in the village, which he called Deir Ech-Cheraf.

In 1870/1871 (1288 AH), an Ottoman census listed the village in the nahiya (sub-district) of Wadi al-Sha'ir.

In 1882, the PEF's Survey of Western Palestine described Deir Sheraf: "A village of small size, situate[d] in a hollow. Above it, beside the road on the east, is a good spring, apparently perennial, and round this are vegetable gardens irrigated with its waters. Figs and olives also grow in the vicinity."

=== British Mandate era ===
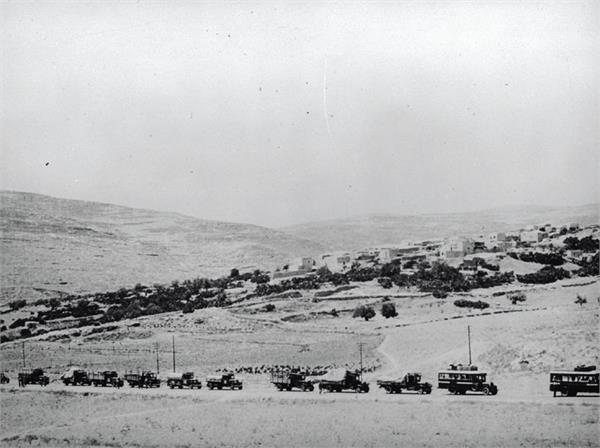
Deir Sharaf 1920

In the 1922 census of Palestine, conducted by the British Mandate authorities, Deir Sharaf had a population of 487, all Muslims, increasing in the 1931 census to 572, still all Muslim, in a total of 118 houses.

In the 1945 statistics, Deir Sharaf had a population of 800, all Muslims, with 7,190 dunams of land, according to an official land and population survey. Of this, 391 dunams were for plantations and irrigable land, 4,335 used for cereals, while 71 dunams were built-up (urban) land.

=== Jordanian era ===
In the wake of the 1948 Arab–Israeli War Deir Sharaf came under Jordanian rule.

The Jordanian census of 1961 found 1,241 inhabitants in Deir Sharaf.

=== Post-1967 ===
Since the Six-Day War in 1967, Deir Sharaf has been under Israeli occupation. The population in the 1967 census conducted by Israel was 973, of whom 46 originated from the Israeli territory.

After the 1995 accords, 23% of village land was classified as Area B, the remaining 77% as Area C. 236 dunams Deir Sharaf’s land has been confiscated by the Israel for the Israeli settlement of Shavei Shomron, located just north of Deir Sharaf.

On 3 July 2014, Israeli authorities stated that they were confiscating 16 dunams of land near the village for “military purposes”.

== Demography ==
The village's residents have their origins in various places, including Ramin, 'Atara, Qusin, Kafr Aqab and others.

== Bibliography ==
- Barron, J.B., ed. (1923). Palestine: Report and General Abstracts of the Census of 1922. Government of Palestine.
- Conder, C.R.; Kitchener, H.H. (1882). The Survey of Western Palestine: Memoirs of the Topography, Orography, Hydrography, and Archaeology. Vol. 2. London: Committee of the Palestine Exploration Fund.
- Government of Jordan, Department of Statistics (1964). First Census of Population and Housing. Volume I: Final Tables; General Characteristics of the Population (PDF).
- Government of Palestine, Department of Statistics (1945). Village Statistics, April, 1945.
- Guérin, V. (1875). Description Géographique Historique et Archéologique de la Palestine (in French). Vol. 2: Samarie, pt. 2. Paris: L'Imprimerie Nationale.
- Hadawi, S. (1970). Village Statistics of 1945: A Classification of Land and Area ownership in Palestine. Palestine Liberation Organization Research Center.
- Hütteroth, W.-D.; Abdulfattah, K. (1977). Historical Geography of Palestine, Transjordan and Southern Syria in the Late 16th Century. Erlanger Geographische Arbeiten, Sonderband 5. Erlangen, Germany: Vorstand der Fränkischen Geographischen Gesellschaft. ISBN 3-920405-41-2.
- Mills, E., ed. (1932). Census of Palestine 1931. Population of Villages, Towns and Administrative Areas. Jerusalem: Government of Palestine.
- Palmer, E.H. (1881). The Survey of Western Palestine: Arabic and English Name Lists Collected During the Survey by Lieutenants Conder and Kitchener, R. E. Transliterated and Explained by E.H. Palmer. Committee of the Palestine Exploration Fund.
- Robinson, E.; Smith, E. (1841). Biblical Researches in Palestine, Mount Sinai and Arabia Petraea: A Journal of Travels in the year 1838. Vol. 3. Boston: Crocker & Brewster.
- Zertal, A. (2004). The Manasseh Hill Country Survey. Vol. 1. Boston: BRILL. ISBN 9004137564.
