= An-Naqura =

An Naqura
- Municipality type D (Village council)

Arabic transcription(s)
  - Arabic: الناقورة
  - Latin: an-Naqoura (official) al-Nakura (unofficial)
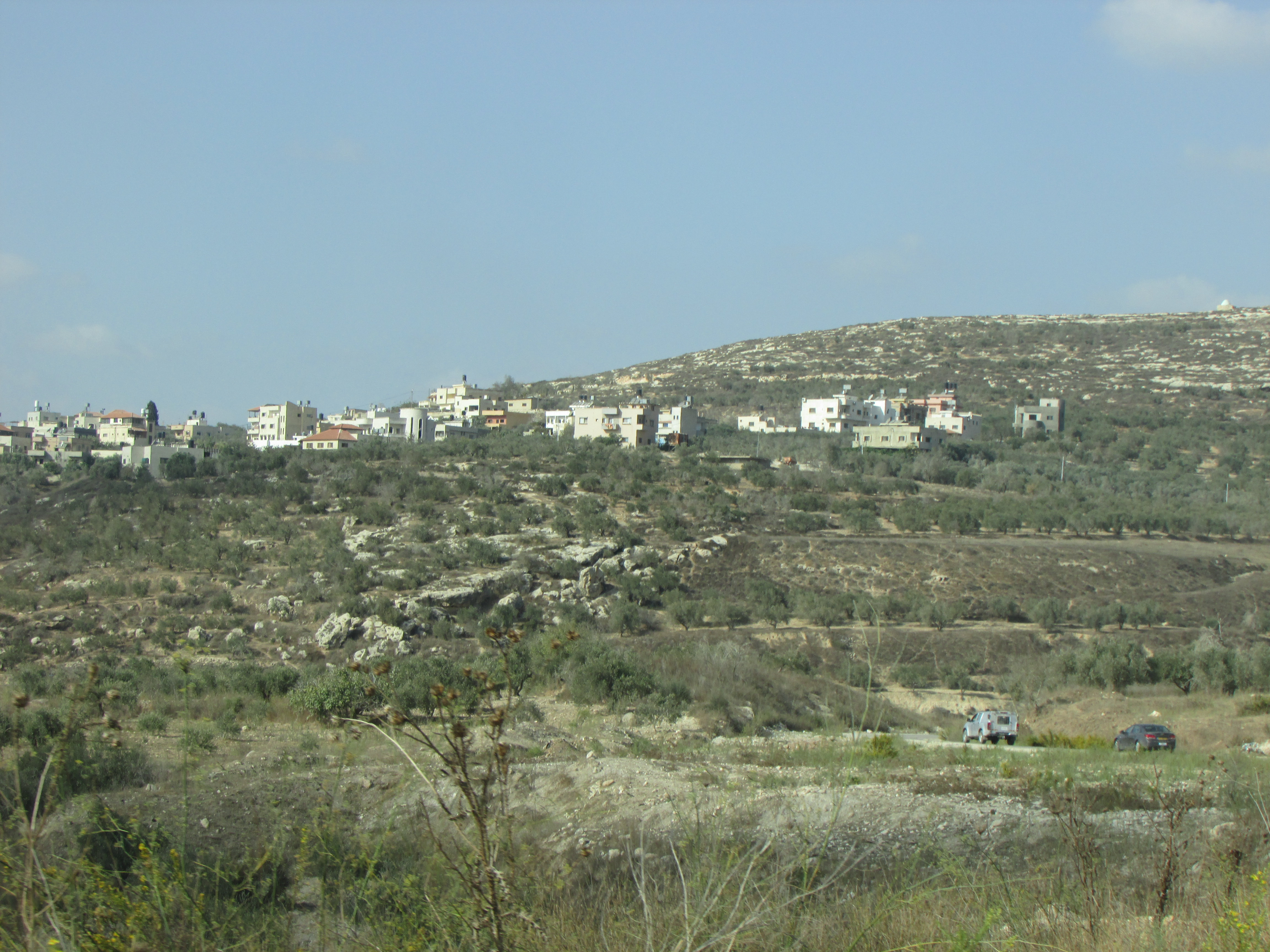
- Houses in south An-Naqura. Up on the hill on the right is Ibrahim al-Adham Sheikh tomb.

- Location of An Naqura within Palestine
- Coordinates: 32°15′56″N 35°12′05″E
- Palestine grid: 169/185
- State: State of Palestine
- Governorate: Nablus

Government
  - Type: Village council
  - Head of Municipality: Muhammad Hashish

Population (2017)
  - Total: 1,786
- Name meaning: En Nakurah: the horn or trumpet

An-Naqura (Arabic: الناقورة, also spelled al-Nakura) is a Palestinian village in the Nablus Governorate in northern West Bank, located 10 kilometers northwest of Nablus and adjacent to the Israeli settlement of Shavei Shomron. According to the Palestinian Central Bureau of Statistics (PCBS) census, the village had a population of 1,545 in 2007 and 1,786 in 2017. An-Naqura is administered by a ten-member village council headed by Muhammad Hashish.

== Location ==
An Naqura is located 7.57 km northwest of Nablus. It is bordered by Zawata to the east, Ijnisinya to the east and north, Sabastiya to the north, Deir Sharaf to the west and south, and Beit Iba to the south.

== History ==
Pottery sherds from the Early Bronze I, Iron Age II, late Roman, Byzantine, early Muslim and Medieval eras have been found here.

=== Ottoman era ===
It has been suggested that An-Naqura was the village named Aqbara or Aquira, in the 1596 Ottoman tax records. It had 23 households and 5 bachelors, all Muslim.

In 1667, Anthimus mentions a Christian population in this village, though it had no church.

In 1838 Robinson noted the village as en-Nakurah in the Wady esh-Sha'ir district, west of Nablus.

In 1870, Victor Guérin noted it as a village on a hill, with 300 inhabitants, where ancient stones were used in the house-walls.

In 1870/1871 (1288 AH), an Ottoman census listed the village in the nahiya (sub-district) of Wadi al-Sha'ir.

In 1882, the PEF's Survey of Western Palestine (SWP) described En Nakurah: "A small stone village on the slope of the hill. It has olives, which appear to grow half wild, and a spring of good water, apparently perennial, in the valley to the north, near which are vegetable gardens. A small Mukam stands above the village, on the south."

=== British Mandate era ===
In the 1922 census of Palestine conducted by the British Mandate authorities, Nakura had a population of 233 Muslims, increasing in the 1931 census to 247, still all Muslims, in a total of 69 houses.

In the 1945 statistics En Naqura had a population of 350 Muslims and a total of 5,507 dunams of land, according to an official land and population survey. Of this, 591 dunams were plantations and irrigable land, 3,444 were used for cereals, while 27 dunams were built-up land.

=== Jordanian era ===
In the wake of the 1948 Arab–Israeli War, and after the 1949 Armistice Agreements, An-Naqura came under Jordanian rule.

The Jordanian census of 1961 found 487 inhabitants.

=== Post-1967 ===
Since the Six-Day War in 1967, An-Naqura has been held under Israeli occupation. A census recorded by the Israeli Civil Administration that same year recorded 610 persons, of whom 37 were refugees from Israel.

After the 1995 accords, 14% of village land was classified as Area A, 51% was classified as Area B, while the remaining 35% was classified as Area C. Israel has “confiscated” 680 dunums of village land for the Israeli settlement of Shavei Shomron.

== Demography ==
=== Local origins ===
Some of an-Naqura's inhabitants have origins in Burqa and a few nearby khirbets.

== Bibliography ==
- Barron, J.B., ed. (1923). Palestine: Report and General Abstracts of the Census of 1922. Government of Palestine.
- Conder, C.R.; Kitchener, H.H. (1882). The Survey of Western Palestine: Memoirs of the Topography, Orography, Hydrography, and Archaeology. Vol. 2. London: Committee of the Palestine Exploration Fund.
- Crowfoot, J.W.; Kenyon, K.M.; Sukenik, E.L. (1942). The Buildings at Samaria (Samaria-Sebaste, I). London: Palestine Exploration Fund. pp. 79–81.
- Ellenblum, R. (2003). Frankish Rural Settlement in the Latin Kingdom of Jerusalem. Cambridge University Press. ISBN 9780521521871.
- Government of Jordan, Department of Statistics (1964). First Census of Population and Housing. Volume I: Final Tables; General Characteristics of the Population (PDF).
- Government of Palestine, Department of Statistics (1945). Village Statistics, April, 1945.
- Guérin, V. (1875). Description Géographique Historique et Archéologique de la Palestine (in French). Vol. 2: Samarie, pt. 2. Paris: L'Imprimerie Nationale.
- Hadawi, S. (1970). Village Statistics of 1945: A Classification of Land and Area ownership in Palestine. Palestine Liberation Organization Research Center. Archived from the original on 2018-12-08.
- Hütteroth, W.-D.; Abdulfattah, K. (1977). Historical Geography of Palestine, Transjordan and Southern Syria in the Late 16th Century. Erlanger Geographische Arbeiten, Sonderband 5. Erlangen, Germany: Vorstand der Fränkischen Geographischen Gesellschaft. ISBN 3-920405-41-2.
- Mills, E., ed. (1932). Census of Palestine 1931. Population of Villages, Towns and Administrative Areas. Jerusalem: Government of Palestine.
- Palmer, E.H. (1881). The Survey of Western Palestine: Arabic and English Name Lists Collected During the Survey by Lieutenants Conder and Kitchener, R. E. Transliterated and Explained by E.H. Palmer. Committee of the Palestine Exploration Fund.
- Perlmann, Joel: The 1967 Census of the West Bank and Gaza Strip: A Digitized Version. Annandale-on-Hudson, N.Y.: Levy Economics Institute of Bard College. November 2011 – February 2012. [Digitized from: Israel Central Bureau of Statistics, Census of Population and Housing, 1967 Conducted in the Areas Administered by the IDF, Vols. 1–5 (1967–70), and Census of Population and Housing: East Jerusalem, Parts 1 and 2 (1968–70).]
- Robinson, E.; Smith, E. (1841). Biblical Researches in Palestine, Mount Sinai and Arabia Petraea: A Journal of Travels in the year 1838. Vol. 3. Boston: Crocker & Brewster.
- Zertal, A. (2004). The Manasseh Hill Country Survey. Vol. 1. Boston: BRILL. ISBN 9004137564.
