= Qasim al-Ahmad =

Ottoman Empire politician

Qasim Pasha al-Ahmad
- Born: Beit Wazan, Eyalet of Sidon, Ottoman Empire
- Died: Late 1834; Damascus, Damascus Vilayet
- Known for: Head of Qasim clan Chief of Jamma'in Subdistrict; Mutasallim of Jerusalem; Mutasallim of Nablus; Leader of the Peasants' revolt in Palestine

Qasim Pasha al-Ahmad (died 1834) was the chief of the Jamma'in subdistrict of Jabal Nablus during the Ottoman and Egyptian periods in Palestine in the mid-19th century. He also served as the mutassalim (tax collector) of Jerusalem between 1832 and 1833. Qasim headed the Qasim clan, a prominent rural family of Jabal Nablus. He led the peasants of Palestine in their revolt against the Egyptian rule of Ibrahim Pasha in 1834. Following the revolt's suppression, he was captured and executed by the authorities.

== Early life and background ==
Qasim was born in Beit Wazan, the throne village of the Qasim clan. The Qasim clan formed the eastern branch of the Bani Ghazi tribe in the Jamma'in subdistrict. The western branch were known as the Rayyan clan and were based in Majdal Yaba. In the centuries-long intermittent civil feuds in Palestine between the Qays and Yaman factions, the Qasim were part of the Yamani coalition.

== Growth of influence ==
In the 19th century, Qasim, along with Ahmad al-Qasim Jarrar, of the Jarrar family, led a local struggle against the Tuqan family under Musa Bey Tuqan's leadership for dominance over Nablus, the commercial center of Jabal Nablus. In the early 1820s, Musa Bey and his forces, buoyed by some troops of Sulayman Pasha, the Ottoman governor of Acre, besieged Qasim at the village of Sarra, southwest of Nablus. Qasim led all of his men in a strong charge against Musa's forces, breaking the siege and causing Musa and Sulaiman's troops to disperse and flee to Nablus. According to local accounts, Qasim personally killed 295 men with his sword, not counting anyone who he may have shot with his rifle.

Sulaiman was replaced by Abdullah Pasha, who was on friendlier terms with Qasim. He appointed him as the mutasallim (tax collector) of Nablus. Musa Bey died in 1823. Following his death, Qasim moved to Nablus and purchased the Sha'riwiyya soap factory. Nabulsi soap was a valuable commodity produced in the city and owning a factory that produced it allowed Qasim to accumulate both wealth and influence in the city and its environs.

== Peasants' revolt and execution ==
In 1831, the ruler of Ottoman Egypt, Muhammad Ali rebelled against the Ottoman Sultan and sought to dethrone the Othomans, he dispatched his son Ibrahim Pasha in a campaign in the Levant to pave the way for Constantinople. Acre fell that year as did much of Palestine. Initially, relations between Ibrahim Pasha and Qasim were good. Qasim contributed peasant irregulars to Ibrahim Pasha's war effort in Syria in 1832. The latter was an adviser to Ibrahim Pasha continued to serve as chief of Jabal Nablus. Three of his sons were given the position of mutasallim: Muhammad al-Qasim in Nablus, Yusuf in Jerusalem and Uthman in Jaffa.

Relations soured between the two men when Husayn Abd al-Hadi was given the position of mutasallim of Nablus. Abd al-Hadi and Qasim had been allies prior to the appointment as members of the Yaman confederation. General hostility to Egyptian rule in Palestine was also growing due to additional taxes and army conscription orders imposed by Ibrahim Pasha. Qasim rallied the peasants and rural chiefs of Jabal Nablus and led the 1834 peasants' revolt against Ibrahim Pasha.

By June 1834, the rebels were in control of most of Palestine. Muhammad Ali arrived in Palestine and began negotiations to end the revolt with various rebel leaders. Qasim requested a pardon from Ibrahim Pasha so that he could negotiate an end to the fighting himself. Ibrahim agreed and with guarantees of safety by Abd al-Hadi, Qasim met with Ibrahim in late June. The latter admonished Qasim for his betrayal of Muhammad Ali, to which Qasim responded with an apology and an explanation that his hand was forced. By the end of the meeting, the two reconciled and Ibrahim reappointed Qasim as mutassalim of both Nablus and Jerusalem. The peace unraveled after the arrest of several Jerusalemite notables on Muhammad Ali's orders, which made Qasim believe the truce was a ruse to demobilize the rebels while reinforcements arrived from Egypt.

Ibrahim Pasha's forces, backed by reinforcements from Egypt, launched an offensive against Jabal Nablus, defeating Qasim's men at Zeita, forcing them to withdraw to Deir al-Ghusun. There many of Qasim's forces defected in response to a request by Abd al-Hadi. Qasim had several of the defectors killed, and his forces were routed in the village. Qasim and his sons escaped, and Ibrahim's forces pursued them to Hebron. The latter was leveled by Egyptian forces, but Qasim evaded capture again and sought safety in al-Karak. He was sheltered by Duwaikhi al-Samir, but after al-Karak was leveled by Ibrahim's forces, Duwaikhi handed Qasim over.

Qasim was executed in Damascus in late 1834, while his sons Muhammad and Yusuf were executed in Acre. His other sons Uthman and Mahmud were exiled to Egypt. Mahmud later succeeded his father as mutasallim of the Jamma'in subdistrict. Qasim remained a popular figure among the peasantry of Jabal Nablus, who petitioned that Mahmud replace Sulayman Abd al-Hadi as mutasallim of Nablus.

== Bibliography ==
- Baer, G. (1982). Fellah and Townsman in the Middle East: Studies in Social History. Psychology Press. ISBN 9780714631264.
- Beinin, J. (2001). Workers and Peasants in the Modern Middle East. Cambridge University Press. ISBN 9780521629034.
- Doumani, B. (1995). Rediscovering Palestine: Merchants and Peasants in Jabal Nablus, 1700-1900. University of California Press. ISBN 9780520203709.
- Krämer, G. (2011). A History of Palestine: From the Ottoman Conquest to the Founding of the State of Israel. Princeton University Press. ISBN 9780691150079.
- Macalister, R.A.S.; Masterman, E. W. G. (1906). "Occasional Papers on the Modern inhabitants of Palestine, part III". Quarterly Statement - Palestine Exploration Fund. 38: 33–50.
- Robinson, E.; Smith, E. (1841). Biblical Researches in Palestine, Mount Sinai and Arabia Petraea: A Journal of Travels in the year 1838. Vol. 3. Boston: Crocker & Brewster.
- Rustum, Asad (1938). The Royal Archives of Egypt and the Disturbances in Palestine, 1834. American University of Beirut Press.
