= Beit Iba =

- Municipality type C

Arabic transcription(s)
  - Arabic: بيت إيبا
  - Latin: Bayt Iba (unofficial)
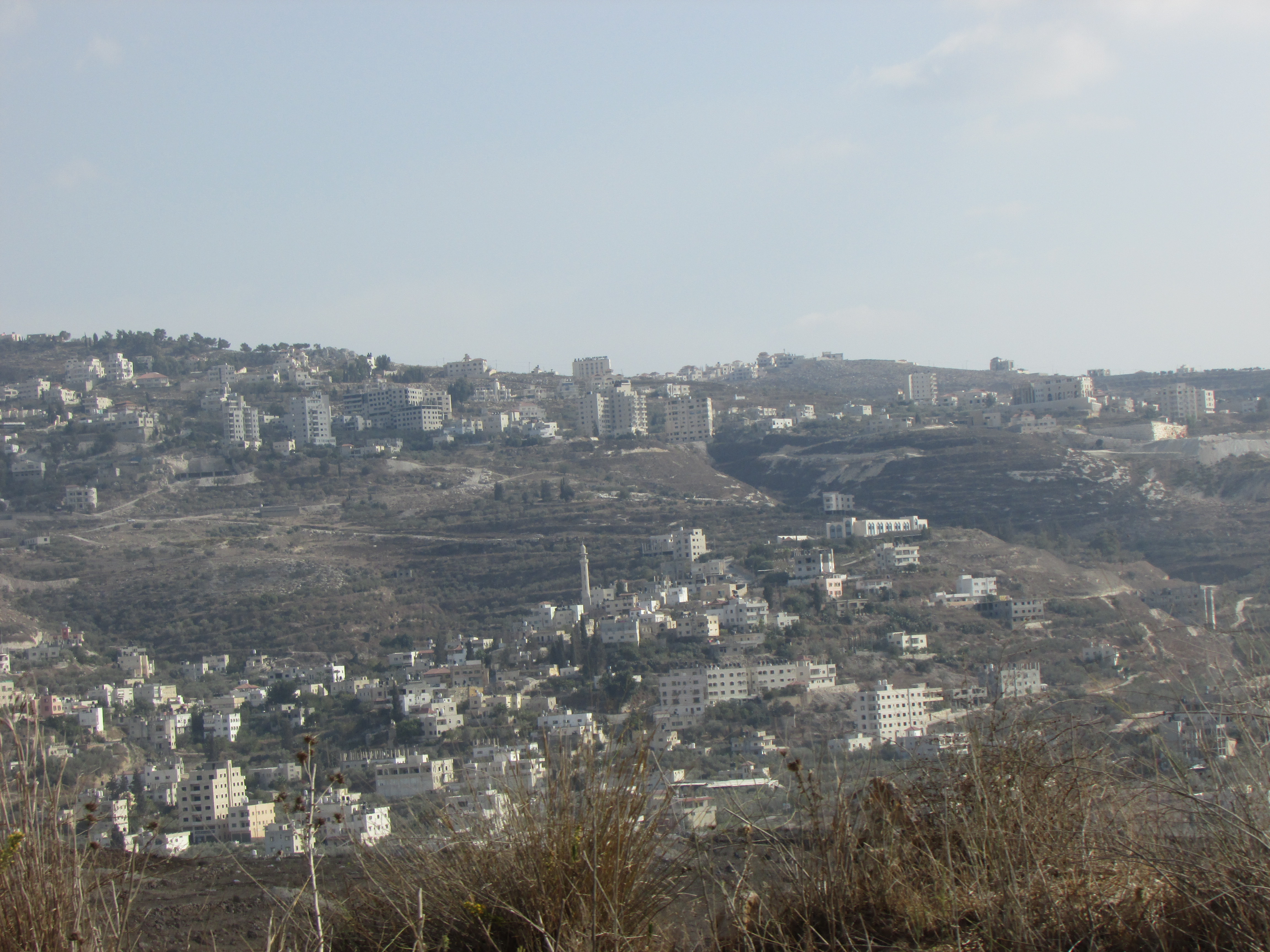
- Beit Iba

- Location of Beit Iba within Palestine
- Coordinates: 32°14′10″N 35°12′35″E
- Palestine grid: 169/182
- State: State of Palestine
- Governorate: Nablus

Government
  - Type: Municipality

Population (2017)
  - Total: 4,079
- Name meaning: The house of Iba

Beit Iba (Arabic: بيت إيبا) is a Palestinian village in the Nablus Governorate in the North central West Bank, located 7 kilometers northwest of Nablus. According to the Palestinian Central Bureau of Statistics (PCBS), the village had a population of 4,079 inhabitants in 2017.

== Location ==
Beit Iba is located 5.13 kilometers (3.19 mi) west of Nablus. It is bordered by Nablus and Beit Wazan to the east, An-Naqura and Zawata to the north, Deir Sharaf and Qusin to the west, and Sarra and Beit Wazan to the south.

== History ==
Ceramics from the Byzantine era have been found here.

=== Ottoman era ===
In 1517, the village was incorporated into the Ottoman Empire with the rest of Palestine, and in 1596, Beit Iba appeared in Ottoman tax registers as being in nahiya (subdistrict) of Jabal Qubal under the liwa' (district) of Nablus. It had a population of 20 households, all Muslims. They paid a fixed tax rate of 33,3% on wheat, barley, summer crops, olive trees, goats and/or beehives, in addition to occasional revenues and a tax on people in the Nablus district; a total of 9,000 akçe. Half to the revenue went to a Waqf.

In 1838, in the Biblical Researches in Palestine, Beit Iba was located in the District of Jurat 'Amra, south of Nablus.

In 1870/1871 (1288 AH), an Ottoman census listed the village with a population of 64 households in the nahiya (sub-district) of Jamma'in al-Awwal, subordinate to Nablus.

In 1882, the PEF's Survey of Western Palestine described Beit Iba as: "A village of moderate size in low ground, with olives; it is of mud and stone, with a good spring ('Aines Subian); to the north. The olive groves in the valley are very fine and ancient; here and there is a small mill, and in spring a stream of water.

=== British Mandate era ===
In the 1922 census of Palestine conducted by the British Mandate authorities, Beit Iba had a population of 456; all Muslims, increasing slightly in the 1931 census to 470 Muslims, in a total of 121 houses.

In the 1945 statistics, the population was 630, all Muslims, with 5,063 dunams of land, according to an official land and population survey. Of this, 762 dunams were for plantations or irrigated land, 3,368 for cereals, while 41 dunams were built-up land.

=== Jordanian era ===
In the wake of the 1948 Arab–Israeli War Beit Iba came under Jordanian rule.

The Jordanian census of 1961 found 1,069 inhabitants in Beit Iba.

=== 1967 and aftermath ===
Since the Six-Day War in 1967, Beit Iba has been under Israeli occupation.

After the 1995 accords, 45% of the village land is defined as being in Area A, 34% is Area B, while the remaining 21% Area C.

== Bibliography ==
- Barron, J.B., ed. (1923). Palestine: Report and General Abstracts of the Census of 1922. Government of Palestine.
- Conder, C.R.; Kitchener, H.H. (1882). The Survey of Western Palestine: Memoirs of the Topography, Orography, Hydrography, and Archaeology. Vol. 2. London: Committee of the Palestine Exploration Fund.
- Dauphin, C. (1998). La Palestine byzantine, Peuplement et Populations. BAR International Series 726 (in French). Vol. III : Catalogue. Oxford: Archeopress. ISBN 0-860549-05-4.
- Government of Jordan, Department of Statistics (1964). First Census of Population and Housing. Volume I: Final Tables; General Characteristics of the Population (PDF).
- Government of Palestine, Department of Statistics (1945). Village Statistics, April, 1945.
- Hadawi, S. (1970). Village Statistics of 1945: A Classification of Land and Area ownership in Palestine. Palestine Liberation Organization Research Center.
- Hütteroth, W.-D.; Abdulfattah, K. (1977). Historical Geography of Palestine, Transjordan and Southern Syria in the Late 16th Century. Erlanger Geographische Arbeiten, Sonderband 5. Erlangen, Germany: Vorstand der Fränkischen Geographischen Gesellschaft. ISBN 3-920405-41-2.
- Mills, E., ed. (1932). Census of Palestine 1931. Population of Villages, Towns and Administrative Areas. Jerusalem: Government of Palestine.
- Palmer, E.H. (1881). The Survey of Western Palestine: Arabic and English Name Lists Collected During the Survey by Lieutenants Conder and Kitchener, R. E. Transliterated and Explained by E.H. Palmer. Committee of the Palestine Exploration Fund.
- Robinson, E.; Smith, E. (1841). Biblical Researches in Palestine, Mount Sinai and Arabia Petraea: A Journal of Travels in the year 1838. Vol. 3. Boston: Crocker & Brewster.
