= Ijnisinya =

- Municipality type D (Village council)

Arabic transcription(s)
  - Arabic: اجنسنيا
  - Latin: Ajnisinya (official)
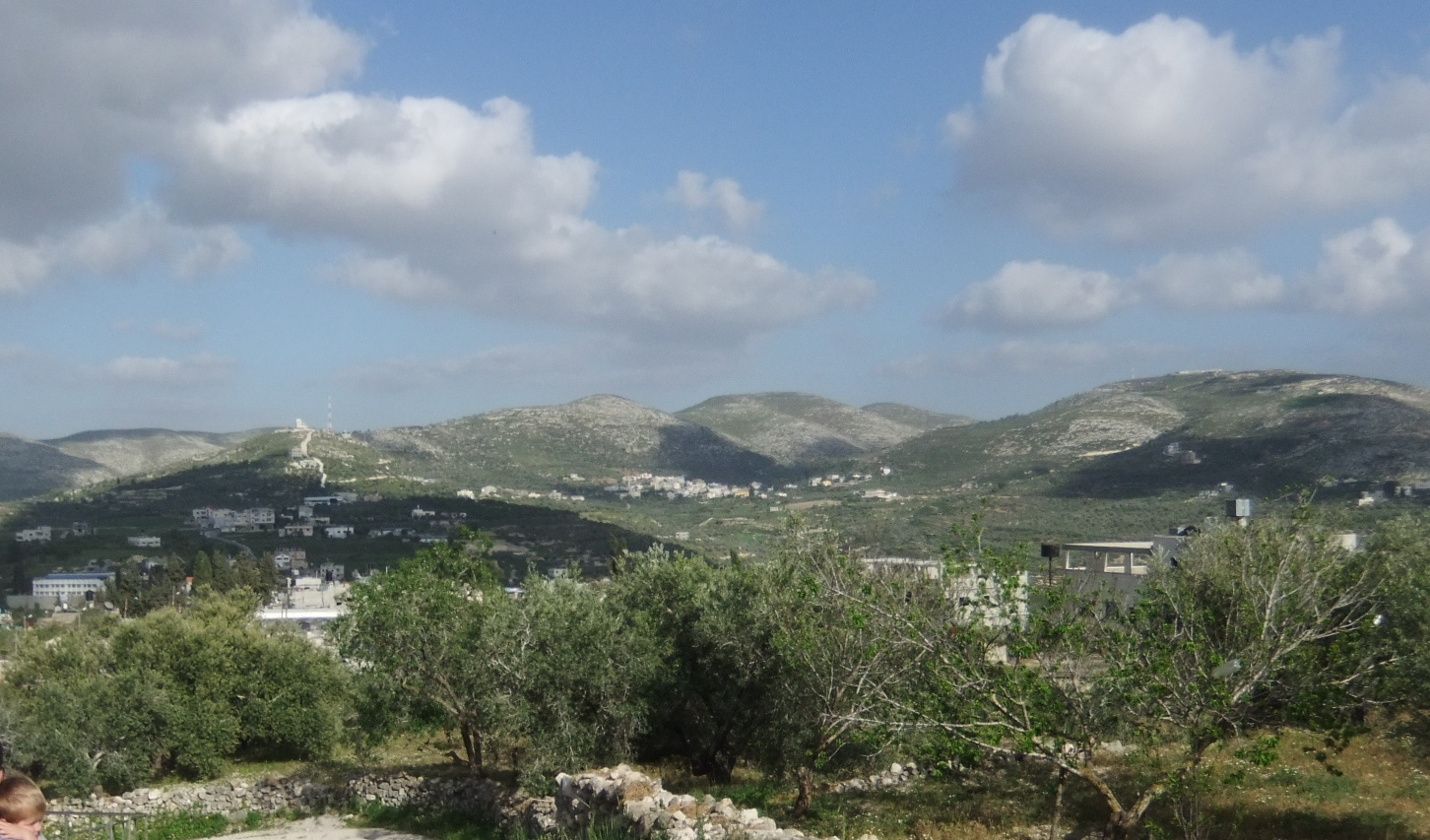
- Ijnisinya in the center. On the left are the houses of Sebastia. Hidden behind the antenna is Nisf Jubeil and Zawata behind the mountain on the right side followed by the city of Nablus.

- Location of Ijnisinya within Palestine
- Coordinates: 32°16′23″N 35°12′59″E
- Palestine grid: 170/186
- State: State of Palestine
- Governorate: Nablus

Government
  - Type: Village council
  - Head of Municipality: Mahmoud Alhaj. Abdul Jabbar Shayeb, formally.

Population (2017)
  - Total: 585
- Name meaning: from personal name

Ijnisinya (Arabic: اجنسنيا, ‘Ijnisinyâ) is a Palestinian village located six kilometres northwest of Nablus in the Nablus Governorate. Most of the working-age inhabitants live as farmers or governmental workers. It had a population of about 585 in 2017. Ijnisinya is governed by a village council.

== History ==
Sherds from Iron Age I, Iron Age II and the Persian eras have been found here.

According to a local legend, the Roman Empress Helena of Constantinople temporarily resided in nearby Sebastia. She is said to have used to swim in a pond in Ijinsinya surrounded by gardens. Men were forbidden from entering the area by Empress Helena in order to guarantee her and her maids' privacy. The name Ijnisinya derives from Greek, translating as "the Eden of women" reflecting the original use of the village site. A scientific analysis by philologist Ran Zadok derives the name from the Aramaic gn sny', the "bramble's enclosure," indicating the historical antiquity of using dense thornbush fencing to protect agricultural orchards prior to the modern introduction of American cacti.

=== Roman remains ===
There is an Ancient Roman building named Sheikh Shu'la that lies atop a hill overlooking three villages, including Ijnisinya as well as, Sebastia, and an-Naqura. The building is originally said to be a Roman monastery seven floors high. The remains of the monastery include stone closets, a prison, galleys, secret passageways, and several wells. Its name, Shu'leh is one of a number of Arabic words meaning "fire". The building was named thus because the Ayyubid sultan Saladin used it and similar buildings to transmit messages using fire.

The Romans used some of the village lands for a cemetery after Christianity became the Roman Empire's official religion. It is popular belief that these graves contain treasures. The graves are generally referred to as "Christian graves", or Khallet Issa. Byzantine ceramics have been found in the area, as well as ceramic remains from the early Islamic and Medieval eras.

=== Medieval period ===
Ijinsinya's mosque dates back to the days of Umar ibn al-Khattab and is currently part of the village school. Ijnisinya was among a number of Christian villages settled by Crusaders in the area of Nablus and Sebastia during the 12th century.

=== Ottoman era ===
In 1596, it appeared in Ottoman tax registers as "Jinisina", a village in the nahiya of Jabal Sami in the liwa of Nablus. It had a population of 8 households and 4 bachelors, all Muslim, and paid taxes on wheat, barley, summer crops, olive trees, goats and beehives, occasional revenues, a press for olives or grapes; a total of 8,434 akçe. 13/24 of the revenue went to a Waqf; Halil ar-Rahman.

In 1667, during Ottoman rule, Ijnisinya appeared in the list of Greek Orthodox parochial churches. However, by 1838 the village no longer possessed a church, although there were still around 60 Christian residents. The same year Robinson placed 'Ijnisnia in the Wady esh-Sha'ir district, west of Nablus.

In 1863 Victor Guérin found a small village, with both Muslim and Christians villagers. In 1882, the PEF's Survey of Western Palestine described it as "a small hamlet in a valley, with olives around it."

In 1870/1871 (1288 AH), an Ottoman census listed the village in the nahiya (sub-district) of Wadi al-Sha'ir.

Before the 20th century, many of the village's residents were Christians, but following disagreements with its Muslim residents, they emigrated to villages with large Christian populations, particularly Zababdeh near Jenin and Bir Zeit near Ramallah.

=== British Mandate era ===
In the 1922 census of Palestine, conducted by the British Mandate authorities, Jenesenia had 119 residents, all Muslims, increasing in the 1931 census to 157, still all Muslim, in a total of 30 houses.

In the 1945 statistics the population was 200, all Muslims, with a total land area of 6,547. Of this, 907 dunams were plantations and irrigable land, 3,216 used for cereals, while 30 dunams were built-up land.

=== Jordanian era ===
In the wake of the 1948 Arab–Israeli War Ijnisinya came under Jordanian rule.

In 1961, the population was 239.

=== Post-1967 ===
Since the Six-Day War in 1967, Ijnisinya has been under Israeli occupation, the same year the population was 256.

In a 1997 census by the Palestinian Central Bureau of Statistics (PCBS), there were 418 inhabitants, of which 70 (16.7%) were refugees. The gender distribution was exactly even; 50% were males and 50% were females. According to the PCBS, Ijnisinya had a population of 505 inhabitants in 2007.

== Geography ==
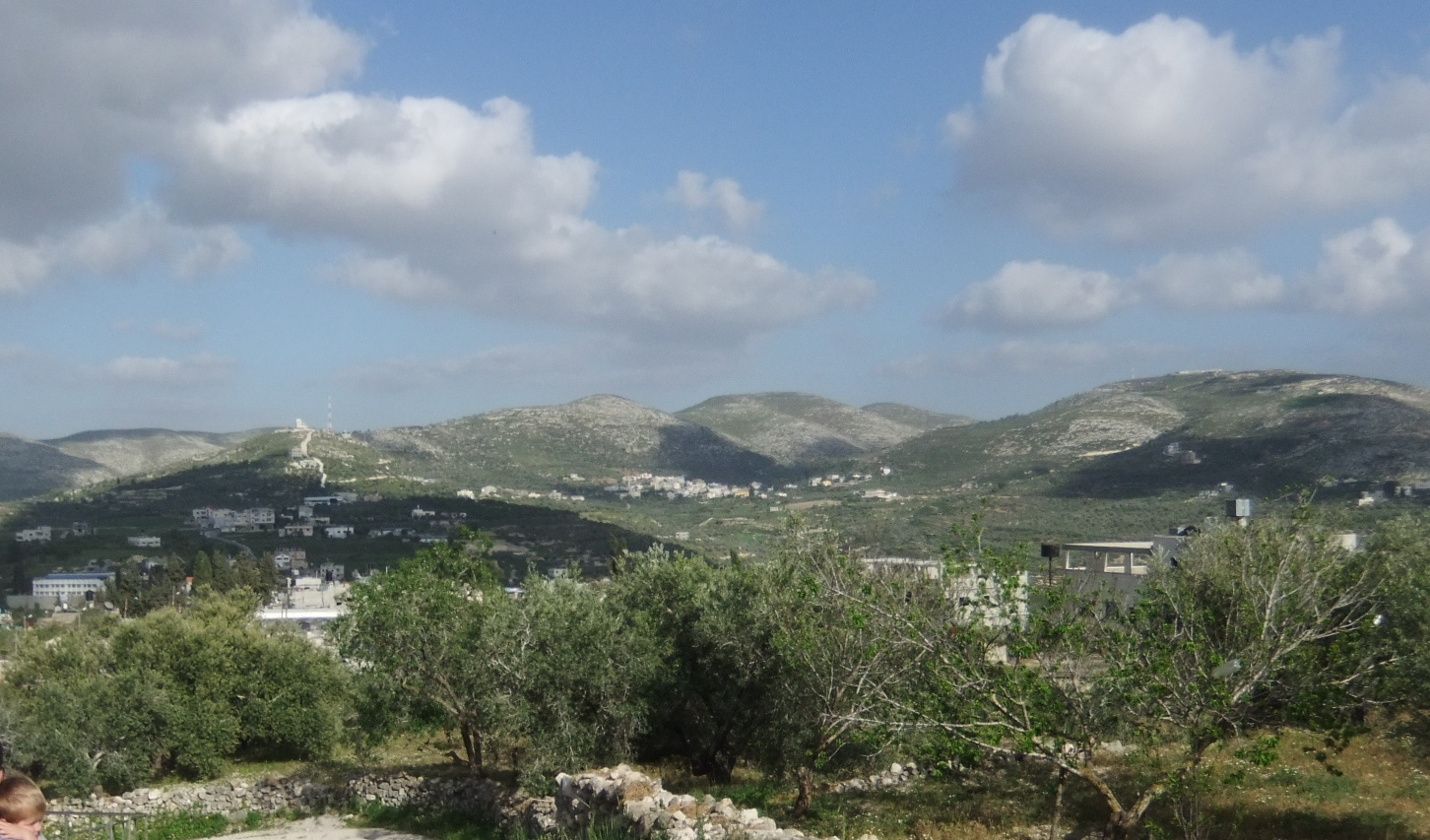
General view of the vicinity. Ijnisinya is in the center

Ijnisinya is located six kilometers northwest of Nablus. It is adjacently east of Sebastia, northeast of an-Naqura, south of Beit Imrin, north of Zawata, west of Asira Al-Shamaliya Ijnisinya has an elevation of 460 meters above sea level.

It has a total land area of 6,547 dunams, of which around two-thirds is cultivable. Its built-up area consists of only 30 dunams, olive trees cover 900 dunams, while cereals make-up the majority of the remaining cultivable land.

On August 4, 2001, Israeli forces burned over 200 olive trees belonging to Ijnisinya and Zawata.

=== Water supply ===
Underneath the village mosque is a wide Roman reservoir for underground water which, until recently, was still used by the residents of the village as a water source. Empress Helena built an aqueduct to carry water from Ijnisinya to Sebastia but it fell into ruin during a drought in Palestine. The aqueduct is named after her, and it starts from Nablus and passes through Ein Beit al-Ma', Ijnisinya, and then to Sebastia.

In 2007, the village pump—constructed in 1977—broke down and the village residents were without water, forced to travel to Asira al-Qibliya to borrow water from that village's pump. A few months later, the Ijnisinya Village Council with the help of the American Near East Refugee Aid, constructed a new pump.

== Demography ==
=== Local origins ===
Some of Ijnisinya's residents are Christians. Some trace their origins to Burqa.

== Bibliography ==
- Barron, J.B., ed. (1923). Palestine: Report and General Abstracts of the Census of 1922. Government of Palestine.
- Conder, C.R.; Kitchener, H.H. (1882). The Survey of Western Palestine: Memoirs of the Topography, Orography, Hydrography, and Archaeology. Vol. 2. London: Committee of the Palestine Exploration Fund.
- Crowfoot, J.W.; Kenyon, K.M.; Sukenik, E.L. (1942). The Buildings at Samaria (Samaria-Sebaste, I). London: Palestine Exploration Fund. pp. 79–81.
- Dauphin, C. (1998). La Palestine byzantine, Peuplement et Populations. BAR International Series 726 (in French). Vol. III : Catalogue. Oxford: Archeopress. ISBN 0-860549-05-4.
- Ellenblum, R. (2003). Frankish Rural Settlement in the Latin Kingdom of Jerusalem. Cambridge University Press. ISBN 9780521521871.
- Government of Jordan, Department of Statistics (1964). First Census of Population and Housing. Volume I: Final Tables; General Characteristics of the Population (PDF).
- Government of Palestine, Department of Statistics (1945). Village Statistics, April, 1945.
- Guérin, V. (1875). Description Géographique Historique et Archéologique de la Palestine (in French). Vol. 2: Samarie, pt. 2. Paris: L'Imprimerie Nationale.
- Hadawi, S. (1970). Village Statistics of 1945: A Classification of Land and Area ownership in Palestine. Palestine Liberation Organization Research Center.
- Hütteroth, W.-D.; Abdulfattah, K. (1977). Historical Geography of Palestine, Transjordan and Southern Syria in the Late 16th Century. Erlanger Geographische Arbeiten, Sonderband 5. Erlangen, Germany: Vorstand der Fränkischen Geographischen Gesellschaft. ISBN 3-920405-41-2.
- Mills, E., ed. (1932). Census of Palestine 1931. Population of Villages, Towns and Administrative Areas. Jerusalem: Government of Palestine.
- Palmer, E.H. (1881). The Survey of Western Palestine: Arabic and English Name Lists Collected During the Survey by Lieutenants Conder and Kitchener, R. E. Transliterated and Explained by E.H. Palmer. Committee of the Palestine Exploration Fund.
- Perlmann, Joel: The 1967 Census of the West Bank and Gaza Strip: A Digitized Version. Annandale-on-Hudson, N.Y.: Levy Economics Institute of Bard College. November 2011 – February 2012. [Digitized from: Israel Central Bureau of Statistics, Census of Population and Housing, 1967 Conducted in the Areas Administered by the IDF, Vols. 1–5 (1967–70), and Census of Population and Housing: East Jerusalem, Parts 1 and 2 (1968–70).]
- Robinson, E.; Smith, E. (1841). Biblical Researches in Palestine, Mount Sinai and Arabia Petraea: A Journal of Travels in the year 1838. Vol. 3. Boston: Crocker & Brewster.
- Zertal, A. (2004). The Manasseh Hill Country Survey. Vol. 1. Boston: BRILL. ISBN 9004137564.
