= Zeita, Tulkarm =

Zeita
- Municipality type D (Village council)

Arabic transcription(s)
  - Arabic: زيتا
  - Latin: Zeita (official); Zayta (unofficial)
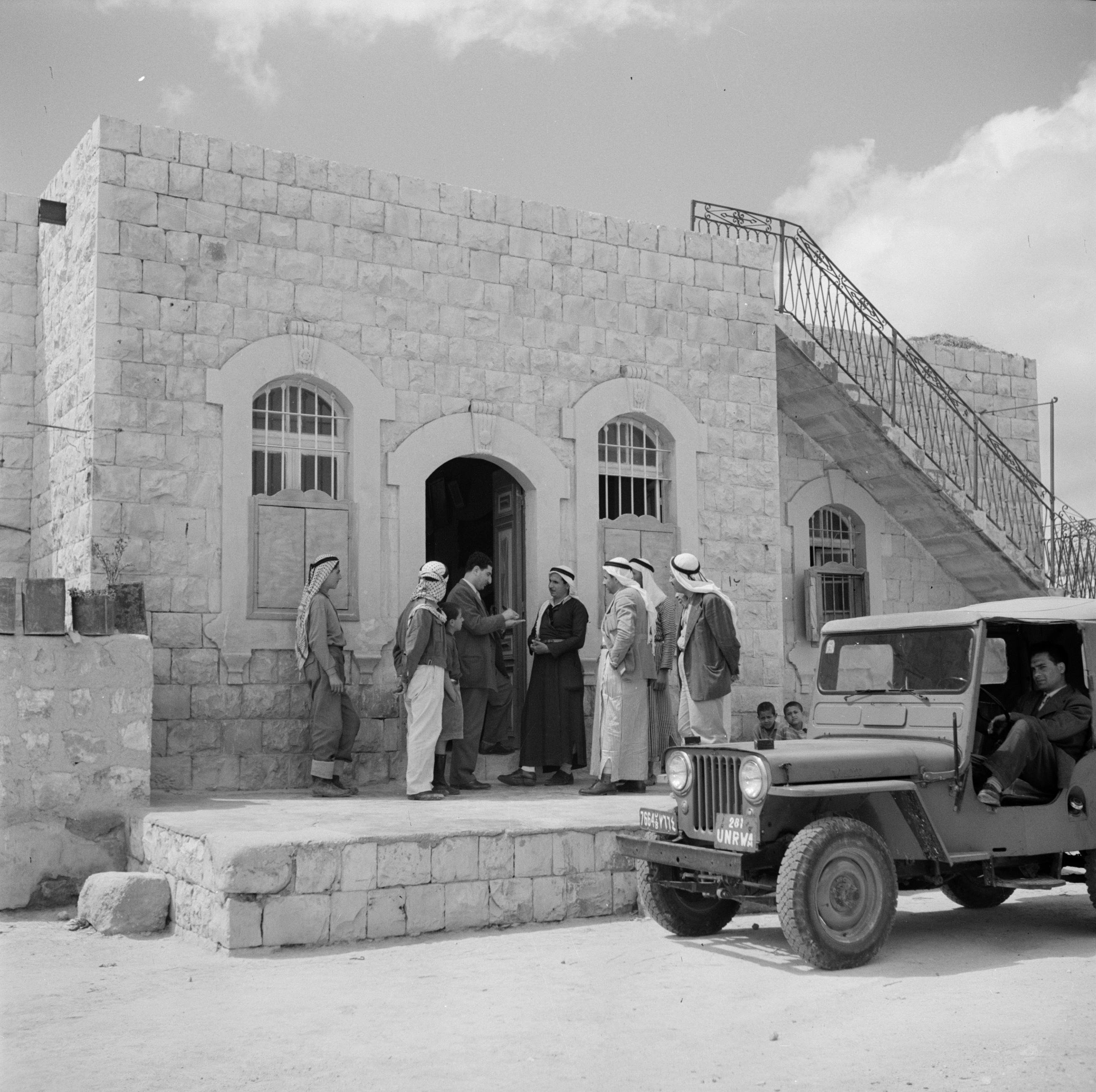
- Zeita, ca. 1950-1955

- Location of Zeita within Palestine
- Coordinates: 32°23′04″N 35°03′03″E
- Palestine grid: 155/199
- State: State of Palestine
- Governorate: Tulkarm

Government
  - Type: Village council

Population (2017)
  - Total: 3,078
- Name meaning: Olive

Zeita (Arabic: زيتا), also known historically as Zeita al-Sha'rawiyya (زيتا الشعراوية), is a Palestinian town in the Tulkarm Governorate of the State of Palestine, in the western West Bank, located 11 kilometers north-east of Tulkarm. According to the Palestinian Central Bureau of Statistics, Zeita had a population of 3,078 inhabitants in 2017. 21.5% of the population of Zeita were refugees in 1997. The healthcare facilities for Zeita are designated as MOH level 2.

== History ==
Zeita is an ancient village. Pottery remains have been found here from the Byzantine, early Muslim and the Middle Ages. Marble Corinthian capitals have been reused in a local Maqam.

The place name ends with a long vowel -ā, typically reflecting the Aramaic absolute state, a morphological feature widely attested in Palestinian toponyms.

According to Levy-Rubin, Zeita was inhabited by Samaritans from the 4th to the 9th centuries. The place was mentioned as a Samaritan settlement in Baba Rabba's revolt during the 4th century CE. A Samaritan elder and leader named haCohen Levi lived there.

In 1265, Zeita was among the villages and estates sultan Baibars allocated to his amirs after he had expelled the Crusaders. Half of Zaita was given to emir Jamal al-Din Aidughdi al-'Azizi, a quarter to emir Shams al-Din Ildikuz al-Karaki, and a quarter to emir Saif al-Din Qilij al-Baghdadi.

=== Ottoman era ===
The village was incorporated into the Ottoman Empire with the rest of Palestine in 1517. In the 1596 Ottoman tax records, it appeared under the name of Zaita, located in the Nahiya Qaqun, in the Nablus Sanjak. It had a population of 91 Muslim and 8 Christian households. They paid a fixed tax-rate of 33.3% on agricultural products, including wheat, barley, summer crops, olive trees, goats and beehives, in addition to occasional revenues and a press for olive oil or grape syrup and a jizya tax on people in the Nablus area; a total of 3,440 akçe. Pottery remains from the Ottoman era have also been found here.

Zeita appears on sheet 45 Jacotin's map drawn-up during Napoleon's invasion in 1799, though its position is not accurate.

During the 1834 Peasants' revolt in Palestine, Ibrahim Pasha of Egypt pursued rebels to Zeita. Ninety rebels were slain here, while the rest fled to nearby Deir al-Ghusun. At Deir al-Ghusun, many of the inhabitants and rebels heeded a call by Husayn Abd al-Hadi to flee once the Egyptian troops arrived. In response, rebel commander Qasim had several of the defectors among his ranks killed. Ibrahim Pasha's troops stormed the hill and the rebels (mostly members of the Qasim, Jarrar, Jayyusi and Barqawi families) were routed, suffering 300 fatalities. In 1838 it was noted as a village, Zeita, in the western Esh-Sha'rawiyeh administrative region, north of Nablus.

In 1870 Victor Guérin found here a village with 600 inhabitants. He further noted: "Here I found, just as at Jett, an ancient capital hollowed out to make a mortar, and used for the same purpose. A very good well, constructed of cut stone, seems ancient."

In 1870/1871 (1288 AH), an Ottoman census listed the village in the nahiya (sub-district) of al-Sha'rawiyya al-Gharbiyya.

In 1882, the PEF's Survey of Western Palestine (SWP) described it as: "a good-sized village on high ground at the edge of the plain. It is surrounded with fig-gardens, and has olives to the south. It would appear to be an ancient place, having tombs to the east. The supply is principally from wells, but there is a small spring ('Ain esh Shabutbut) on the south-west. [..] Two sacred places exist to the south side of the village."

=== British Mandate era ===
In the 1922 census of Palestine conducted by the British Mandate authorities, Zeita had a population of 1,087, all Muslims, increasing in the 1931 census to 1,165 persons, all Muslim, living in 237 houses.

In the 1945 statistics the population of Zeita was 1,780 Muslims, with 6,410 dunams of land according to an official land and population survey. 782 dunams were plantations and irrigable land, 5,120 used for cereals, while 33 dunams were built-up (urban) land.

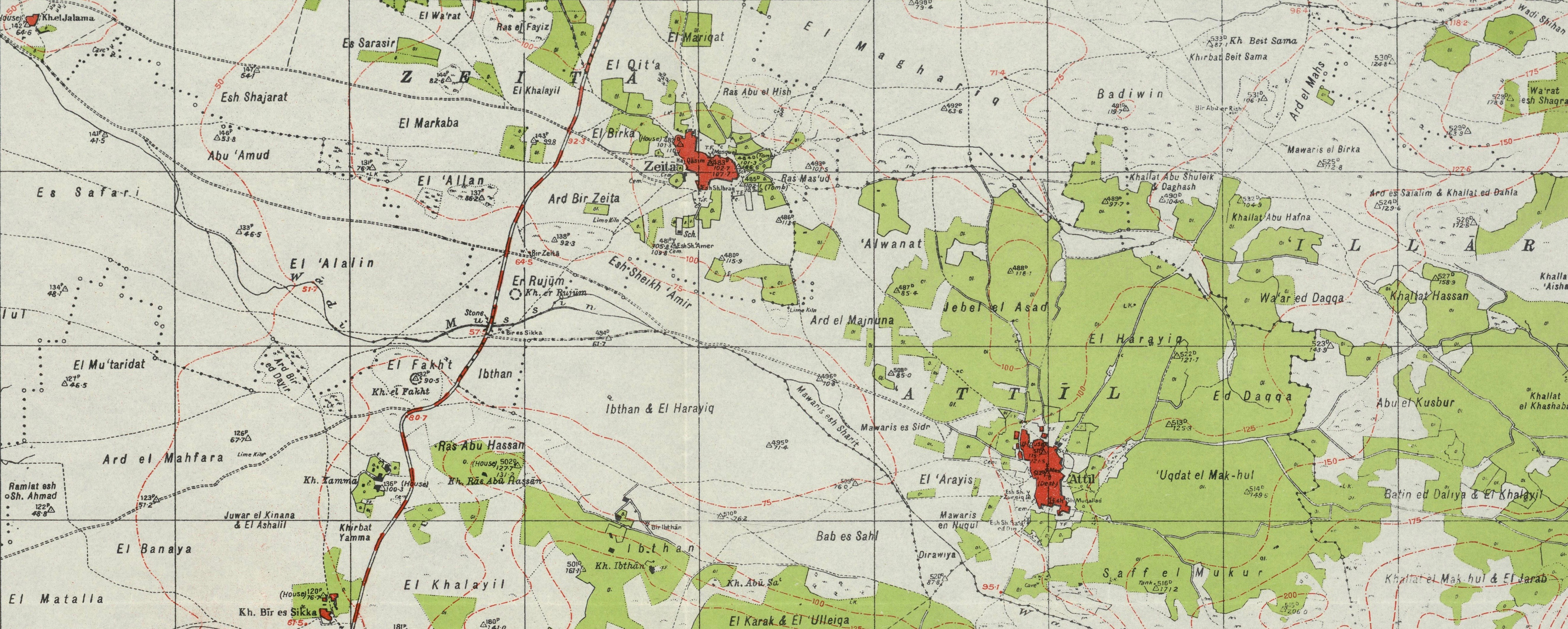
Zeita 1942 1:20,000

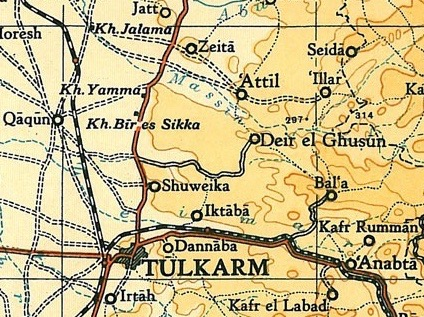
Zeita 1945 1:250,000

=== Jordanian era ===
In the wake of the 1948 Arab–Israeli War, and after the 1949 Armistice Agreements, Zeita came under Jordanian rule, together with the rest of the West Bank.

In 1961, the population was 1,814 persons.

=== Post-1967 ===
After the Six-Day War in 1967, Zeita has been under Israeli occupation.

== Demography ==
=== Local origins ===
Residents of the village hail from several areas, such as Egypt, the area of Ashdod, 'Arura, Kafr al-Labad, and Poria.

== Bibliography ==
- Barron, J.B., ed. (1923). Palestine: Report and General Abstracts of the Census of 1922. Government of Palestine.
- Conder, C.R.; Kitchener, H.H. (1882). The Survey of Western Palestine: Memoirs of the Topography, Orography, Hydrography, and Archaeology. Vol. 2. London: Committee of the Palestine Exploration Fund.
- Dauphin, C. (1998). La Palestine byzantine, Peuplement et Populations. BAR International Series 726 (in French). Vol. III : Catalogue. Oxford: Archeopress. ISBN 0-86054-905-4.
- Government of Jordan, Department of Statistics (1964). First Census of Population and Housing. Volume I: Final Tables; General Characteristics of the Population (PDF).
- Government of Palestine, Department of Statistics (1945). Village Statistics, April, 1945.
- Guérin, V. (1875). Description Géographique Historique et Archéologique de la Palestine (in French). Vol. 2: Samarie, pt. 2. Paris: L'Imprimerie Nationale.
- Karmon, Y. (1960). "An Analysis of Jacotin's Map of Palestine" (PDF). Israel Exploration Journal. 10 (3, 4): 155–173, 244–253. Archived from the original (PDF) on 2019-12-22.
- Hadawi, S. (1970). Village Statistics of 1945: A Classification of Land and Area ownership in Palestine. Palestine Liberation Organization Research Center.
- Hütteroth, W.-D.; Abdulfattah, K. (1977). Historical Geography of Palestine, Transjordan and Southern Syria in the Late 16th Century. Erlanger Geographische Arbeiten, Sonderband 5. Erlangen, Germany: Vorstand der Fränkischen Geographischen Gesellschaft. ISBN 3-920405-41-2.
- Ibn al-Furat (1971). J. Riley-Smith (ed.). Ayyubids, Mamluks and Crusaders: Selections from the "Tarikh Al-duwal Wal-muluk" of Ibn Al-Furat : the Text, the Translation. Vol. 2. Translation by Malcolm Cameron Lyons, Ursula Lyons. Cambridge: W. Heffer.
- Macalister, R. A. Stewart; Masterman, E. W. G. (1906). "Occasional Papers on the Modern inhabitants of Palestine, part III". Quarterly Statement - Palestine Exploration Fund. 38: 33–50.
- Mills, E., ed. (1932). Census of Palestine 1931. Population of Villages, Towns and Administrative Areas. Jerusalem: Government of Palestine.
- Palmer, E.H. (1881). The Survey of Western Palestine: Arabic and English Name Lists Collected During the Survey by Lieutenants Conder and Kitchener, R. E. Transliterated and Explained by E.H. Palmer. Committee of the Palestine Exploration Fund.
- Petersen, Andrew (2005). The Towns of Palestine Under Muslim Rule. British Archaeological Reports. ISBN 1841718211.
- Robinson, E.; Smith, E. (1841). Biblical Researches in Palestine, Mount Sinai and Arabia Petraea: A Journal of Travels in the year 1838. Vol. 3. Boston: Crocker & Brewster.
- Zertal, A. (2016). The Manasseh Hill Country Survey. Vol. 3. Boston: BRILL. ISBN 978-9004312302.
