= Sarra, Nablus =

Sarra
- Municipality type D (Village council)

Arabic transcription(s)
  - Arabic: صرّه
  - Latin: Sorra (unofficial)
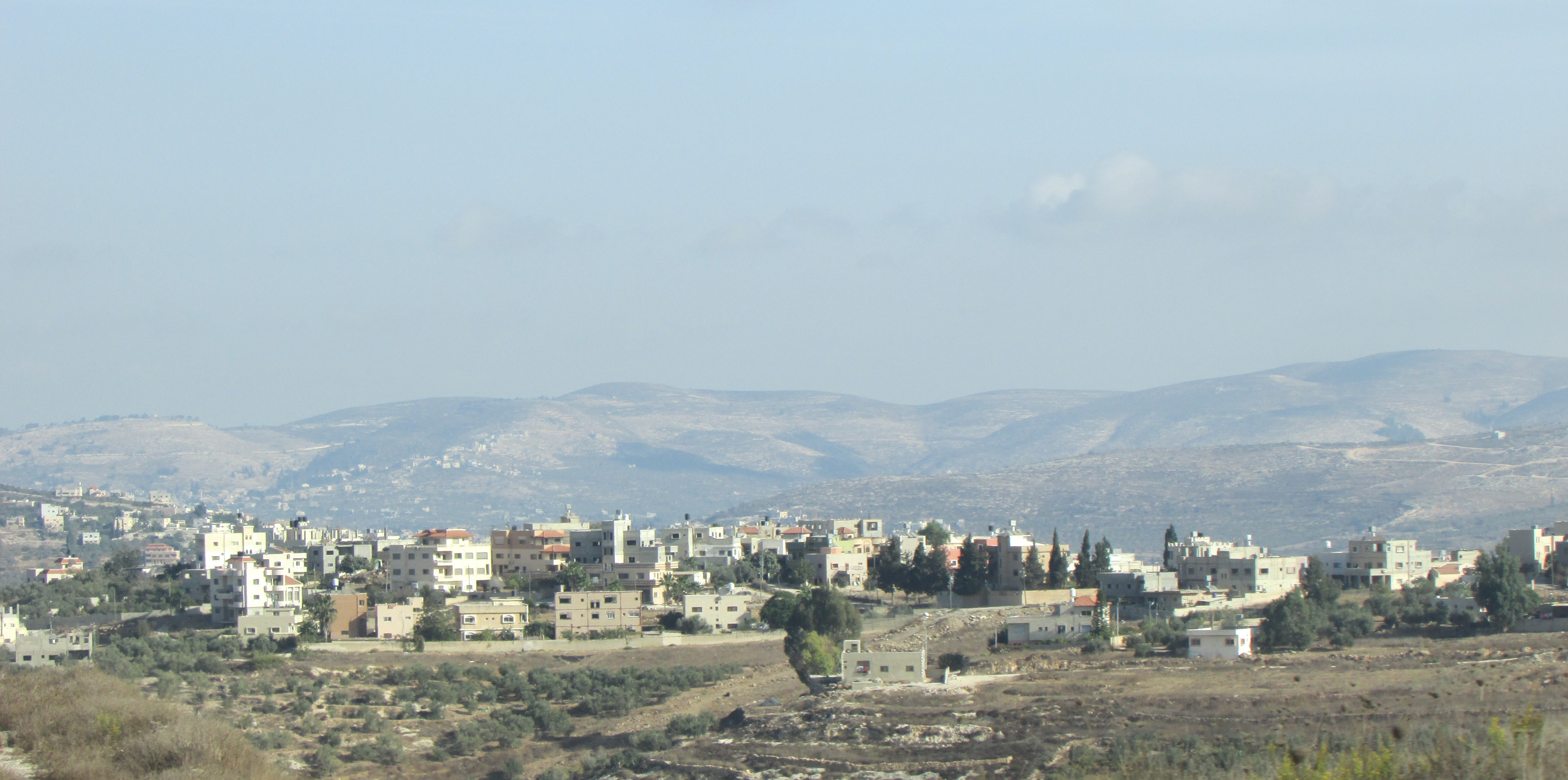
- Sarra in the front. Behind on the left is Burqa

- Location of Sarra within Palestine
- Coordinates: 32°12′36″N 35°11′27″E
- Palestine grid: 168/179
- State: State of Palestine
- Governorate: Nablus

Government
  - Type: Village council

Population (2017)
  - Total: 3,384
- Name meaning: from personal name

Sarra (Arabic: صرّه) is a Palestinian town in the Nablus Governorate in northern West Bank, located 11 kilometers southwest of Nablus. According to the Palestinian Central Bureau of Statistics (PCBS), the town had a population of 3,384 inhabitants in 2017.

== Location ==
Sarra is located 17.8 km west of Nablus. It is bordered by Nablus and Tell to the east, Beit Wazan and Beit Iba to the north, Jit to the west, and Tell to the south.

== History ==
A grave, dating from the Roman Empire era in Palestine, was found looted by thieves just outside Serra.

=== Ottoman era ===
In 1517, the village was included in the Ottoman Empire with the rest of Palestine, and it appeared in the 1596 tax-records as Sarra, located in the Nahiya of Jabal Qubal of the Liwa of Nablus. The population was 19 households and 10 bachelor, all Muslim. They paid a fixed tax rate of 33.3% on agricultural products, such as wheat, barley, summer crops, olive trees, goats and beehives, in addition to occasional revenues and a fixed tax for people of Nablus area; a total of 1,549 akçe.

During the 1834 Peasants' revolt in Palestine, Musa Bek Toukan besieged Qasim al-Ahmad at Kuriet Surra, but Qasim al-Ahmad broke free, and pursued his besieging forces all the way back to Nablus.

In 1838, Surra was located in the District of Jurat 'Amra, south of Nablus.

In 1863 Victor Guérin found it to have 500 inhabitants.

In 1870/1871 (1288 AH), an Ottoman census listed the village with a population of 62 households in the nahiya (sub-district) of Jamma'in al-Awwal, subordinate to Nablus.

In 1882, the PEF's Survey of Western Palestine described Surra as: "A small village in a hollow, with a spring on the south east, surrounded by olives."

=== British Mandate era ===
In the 1922 census of Palestine conducted by the British Mandate authorities, Sarra had a population of 277 Muslims, increasing in the 1931 census to 382 Muslims, in a total of 106 houses.

In the 1945 statistics the population was 540 (all Muslim), while the total land area was 5,928 dunams, according to an official land and population survey. Of this, 540 dunams were for plantations and irrigable land, 3,513 for cereals, while 34 dunams were classified as built-up areas.

=== Jordanian era ===
In the wake of the 1948 Arab–Israeli War, and after the 1949 Armistice Agreements, Surra came under Jordanian rule.

The Jordanian census of 1961 found 767 inhabitants.

=== Post-1967 ===
Since the Six-Day War in 1967, Surra has been held under Israeli occupation along with the rest of the Palestinian territories.

After the 1995 accords 42% of the village land was classified as Area A, 43% classified as Area B, and the remaining 15% classified as Area C.

Sarra has suffered from several reported Israeli price tag attacks:

- 4 March 2011: Israeli settlers from Shvut Rachel damaged roughly 500 olive trees belonging to the village, and stoned homes, apparently in reprisal for the dismantling of several mobile homes.
- 25 July 2011: Settlers torched the farmlands of the village, after Israeli soldiers intervened to stop Israeli peace activists from preventing a group of settlers from uprooting trees, according to IMEMC.

== Bibliography ==
- Barron, J.B., ed. (1923). Palestine: Report and General Abstracts of the Census of 1922. Government of Palestine.
- Conder, C.R.; Kitchener, H.H. (1882). The Survey of Western Palestine: Memoirs of the Topography, Orography, Hydrography, and Archaeology. Vol. 2. London: Committee of the Palestine Exploration Fund.
- Government of Jordan, Department of Statistics (1964). First Census of Population and Housing. Volume I: Final Tables; General Characteristics of the Population (PDF).
- Government of Palestine, Department of Statistics (1945). Village Statistics, April, 1945.
- Guérin, V. (1875). Description Géographique Historique et Archéologique de la Palestine (in French). Vol. 2: Samarie, pt. 2. Paris: L'Imprimerie Nationale.
- Hadawi, S. (1970). Village Statistics of 1945: A Classification of Land and Area ownership in Palestine. Palestine Liberation Organization Research Center.
- Hütteroth, W.-D.; Abdulfattah, K. (1977). Historical Geography of Palestine, Transjordan and Southern Syria in the Late 16th Century. Erlanger Geographische Arbeiten, Sonderband 5. Erlangen, Germany: Vorstand der Fränkischen Geographischen Gesellschaft. ISBN 3-920405-41-2.
- Macalister, R.A.S.; Masterman, E. W. G. (1906). "Occasional Papers on the Modern inhabitants of Palestine, part III". Quarterly Statement - Palestine Exploration Fund. 38: 33–50. doi:10.1179/peq.1906.38.1.33.
- Mills, E., ed. (1932). Census of Palestine 1931. Population of Villages, Towns and Administrative Areas. Jerusalem: Government of Palestine.
- Palmer, E.H. (1881). The Survey of Western Palestine: Arabic and English Name Lists Collected During the Survey by Lieutenants Conder and Kitchener, R. E. Transliterated and Explained by E.H. Palmer. Committee of the Palestine Exploration Fund.
- Robinson, E.; Smith, E. (1841). Biblical Researches in Palestine, Mount Sinai and Arabia Petraea: A Journal of Travels in the year 1838. Vol. 3. Boston: Crocker & Brewster.
