= Beit Imrin =

- Municipality type D (Village council)

Arabic transcription(s)
  - Arabic: بيت امرين
  - Latin: Beit Imrin (official); Bayt Umrin (unofficial)
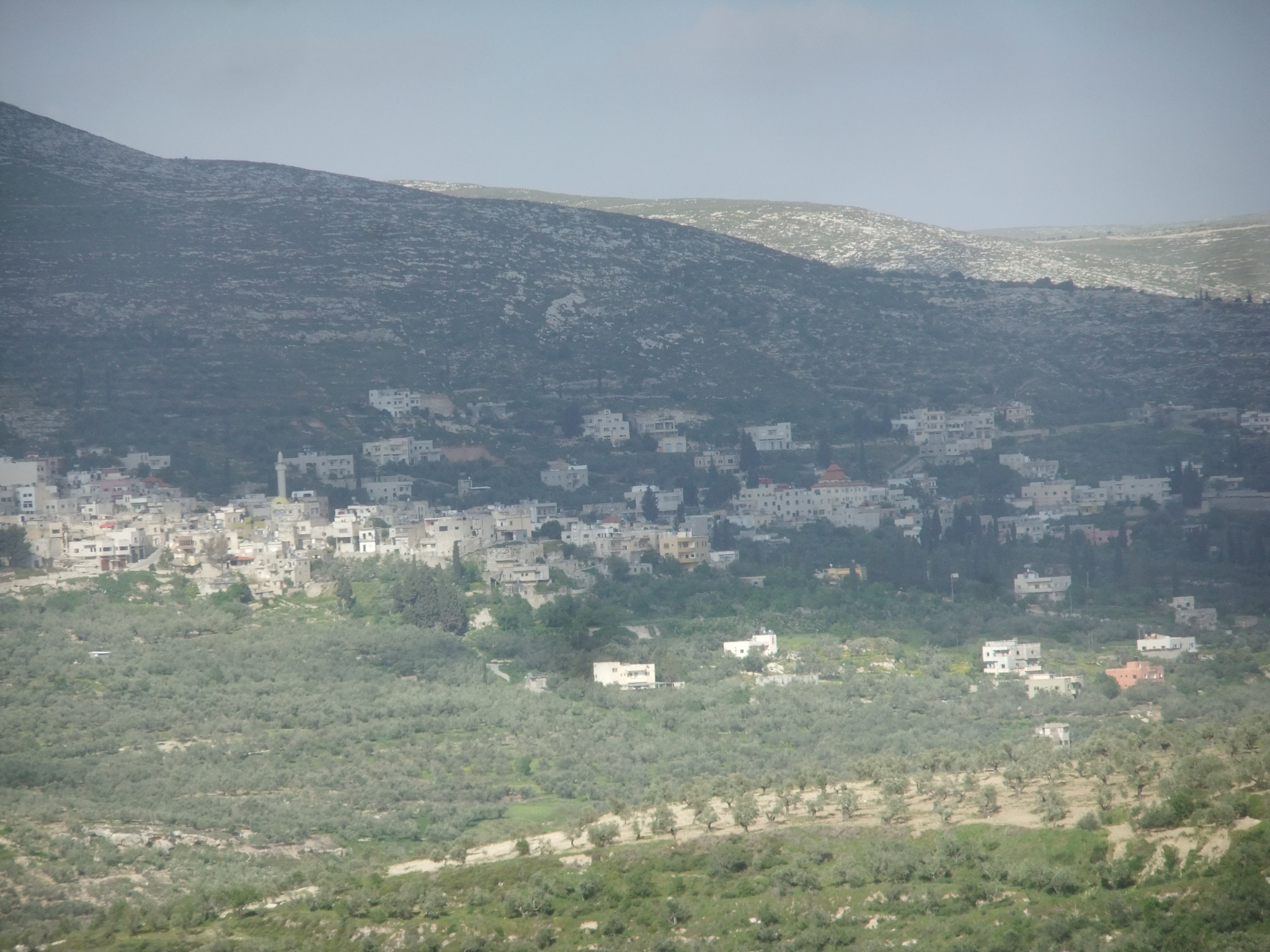
- Beit Imrin, from the west

- Location of Beit Imrin within Palestine
- Coordinates: 32°17′32″N 35°12′56″E
- Palestine grid: 170/188
- State: State of Palestine
- Governorate: Nablus

Government
  - Type: Village council (from 1966)
  - Head of Municipality: Basheer Samarah

Area
  - Total: 12.1 km^{2} (4.7 sq mi)

Population (2017)
  - Total: 3,323
  - Density: 275/km^{2} (711/sq mi)
- Name meaning: "House of Princes", "The House of Imrin"

Beit Imrin (Arabic: بيت امرين, transliterated as "House of Princes") is a Palestinian village in the Nablus Governorate in northern West Bank, located 18 kilometers northwest of Nablus. According to the Palestinian Central Bureau of Statistics (PCBS), the village had a population of 2,821 inhabitants in 2007 and 3,323 by 2017.

Beit Imrin is an agricultural village with the main products being pulses, grains, vegetables, olives, grapes, almonds and figs. There is a girls' primary school and a boys' secondary school in the village. Other public facilities include a health clinic, telephone and postal services.

== History ==
Ceramics from the Byzantine and early Islamic periods have been found here.

According to the Beit Imrin Village Council, Beit Imrin was founded by Arabs from nearby Burqa and the Bani Hassan tribe of Transjordan, whose members also populated Qarawat Bani Hassan. The town of Sebastia is located to the southwest, the villages of Ijnisinya and Nisf Jubeil to the south, Burqa to the northwest and Yasid to the east.

=== Ottoman era ===
In 1517, Beit Imrin was incorporated into the Ottoman Empire with the rest of Palestine. In 1596, it appeared in Ottoman tax registers as a village in the nahiya (subdistrict) of Jabal Sami in the Nablus Sanjak. It had a population of 19 households and 2 bachelors, all Muslim, and paid taxes on wheat, barley, summer crops, olive trees, occasional revenues, goats and beehives, and a press for olives or grapes; a total of 13,200 akçe.

In 1667 there was a Greek Orthodox community in the village.

In 1838 American Biblical scholar Edward Robinson noted that the village was on the road to Jenin. He also noted that the village had a mixture of Greek Christians and Muslim inhabitants. At this time the village had 50 Christians and a priest.

In 1870, Victor Guérin estimated that Beit Imrin had 700 inhabitants. He further noted: "The houses are small and roughly built, except the Sheikh’s house, which is large and well-built. Below the village and to the west there is a fertile valley irrigated by a spring called Ain Dilbeh."

In 1870/1871 (1288 AH), an Ottoman census listed the village in the nahiya (sub-district) of Wadi al-Sha'ir.

In 1882, the PEF's Survey of Western Palestine (SWP) described it as "a village of moderate size in the valley at the foot of the Sheikh Beiyzid chain. It is built of stone, and has a spring in the valley to the south, and olives round it on the east and west. Some of the inhabitants are Greek Christians."

=== British Mandate era ===
In the 1922 census of Palestine conducted by the British Mandate authorities, Beit Imrin had a population of 527; 512 Muslims and 15 Christians, where the Christians were all Orthodox. The population increased in the 1931 census to 620, of whom 13 were Christians and 607 Muslims, in a total of 157 occupied houses.

In the 1945 statistics, the population was 860, all Muslims, with 12,094 dunams of land, according to an official land and population survey. Of this, 1,442 dunams were for plantations or irrigated land, 6,819 for cereals, while 53 dunams were built-up (urban) land.

=== Jordanian era ===
In the wake of the 1948 Arab–Israeli War, and after the 1949 Armistice Agreements, Beit Imrin came under Jordanian rule. It was annexed by Jordan in 1950.

In 1961, the population of Beit Imrin was 1,048.

=== Post-1967 ===
Since the Six-Day War in 1967, the village has been under Israeli occupation. A census that same year recorded the population as 1,100.

After the 1995 accords, 97.7% of the village land was classified as Area A, 1.8% as Area B, and the remaining 0.5% as Area C.

A village council to administer Beit Imrin's civil affairs was established in 1966, with the first mayor being Ayad Youssef Abdel-Rahman Ahsan. The council consists of nine members including the mayor, who currently is Basheer Samarah.

On the night between April 21st and April 22nd 2026, the village was raided by "extremest settlers" who torched a home with 8 family members, including a baby inside, as well as two cars. The victims suffered from suffocation, and no arrests have been made.

== Demography ==
The village had a Christian population, but most of them left. Some of the residents have their origins in Kafr Qaddum, Burqa and Ijnisinya.

== Bibliography ==
- Barron, J.B., ed. (1923). Palestine: Report and General Abstracts of the Census of 1922. Government of Palestine.
- Conder, C.R.; Kitchener, H.H. (1882). The Survey of Western Palestine: Memoirs of the Topography, Orography, Hydrography, and Archaeology. Vol. 2. London: Committee of the Palestine Exploration Fund.
- Ellenblum, R. (2003). Frankish Rural Settlement in the Latin Kingdom of Jerusalem. Cambridge University Press. ISBN 9780521521871.
- Government of Jordan, Department of Statistics (1964). First Census of Population and Housing. Volume I: Final Tables; General Characteristics of the Population (PDF).
- Government of Palestine, Department of Statistics (1945). Village Statistics, April, 1945.
- Guérin, V. (1875). Description Géographique Historique et Archéologique de la Palestine (in French). Vol. 2: Samarie, pt. 2. Paris: L'Imprimerie Nationale.
- Hadawi, S. (1970). Village Statistics of 1945: A Classification of Land and Area ownership in Palestine. Palestine Liberation Organization Research Center.
- Hütteroth, W.-D.; Abdulfattah, K. (1977). Historical Geography of Palestine, Transjordan and Southern Syria in the Late 16th Century. Erlanger Geographische Arbeiten, Sonderband 5. Erlangen, Germany: Vorstand der Fränkischen Geographischen Gesellschaft. ISBN 3-920405-41-2.
- Mills, E., ed. (1932). Census of Palestine 1931. Population of Villages, Towns and Administrative Areas. Jerusalem: Government of Palestine.
- Palmer, E.H. (1881). The Survey of Western Palestine: Arabic and English Name Lists Collected During the Survey by Lieutenants Conder and Kitchener, R. E. Transliterated and Explained by E.H. Palmer. Committee of the Palestine Exploration Fund.
- Perlmann, Joel: The 1967 Census of the West Bank and Gaza Strip: A Digitized Version. Annandale-on-Hudson, N.Y.: Levy Economics Institute of Bard College. November 2011 – February 2012. [Digitized from: Israel Central Bureau of Statistics, Census of Population and Housing, 1967 Conducted in the Areas Administered by the IDF, Vols. 1–5 (1967–70), and Census of Population and Housing: East Jerusalem, Parts 1 and 2 (1968–70).]
- Robinson, E.; Smith, E. (1841). Biblical Researches in Palestine, Mount Sinai and Arabia Petraea: A Journal of Travels in the year 1838. Vol. 3. Boston: Crocker & Brewster.
- Zertal, A. (2004). The Manasseh Hill Country Survey. Vol. 1. Boston: BRILL. ISBN 9004137564.
