= Zawata =

- Municipality type D (Village council)

Arabic transcription(s)
  - Arabic: زواتا
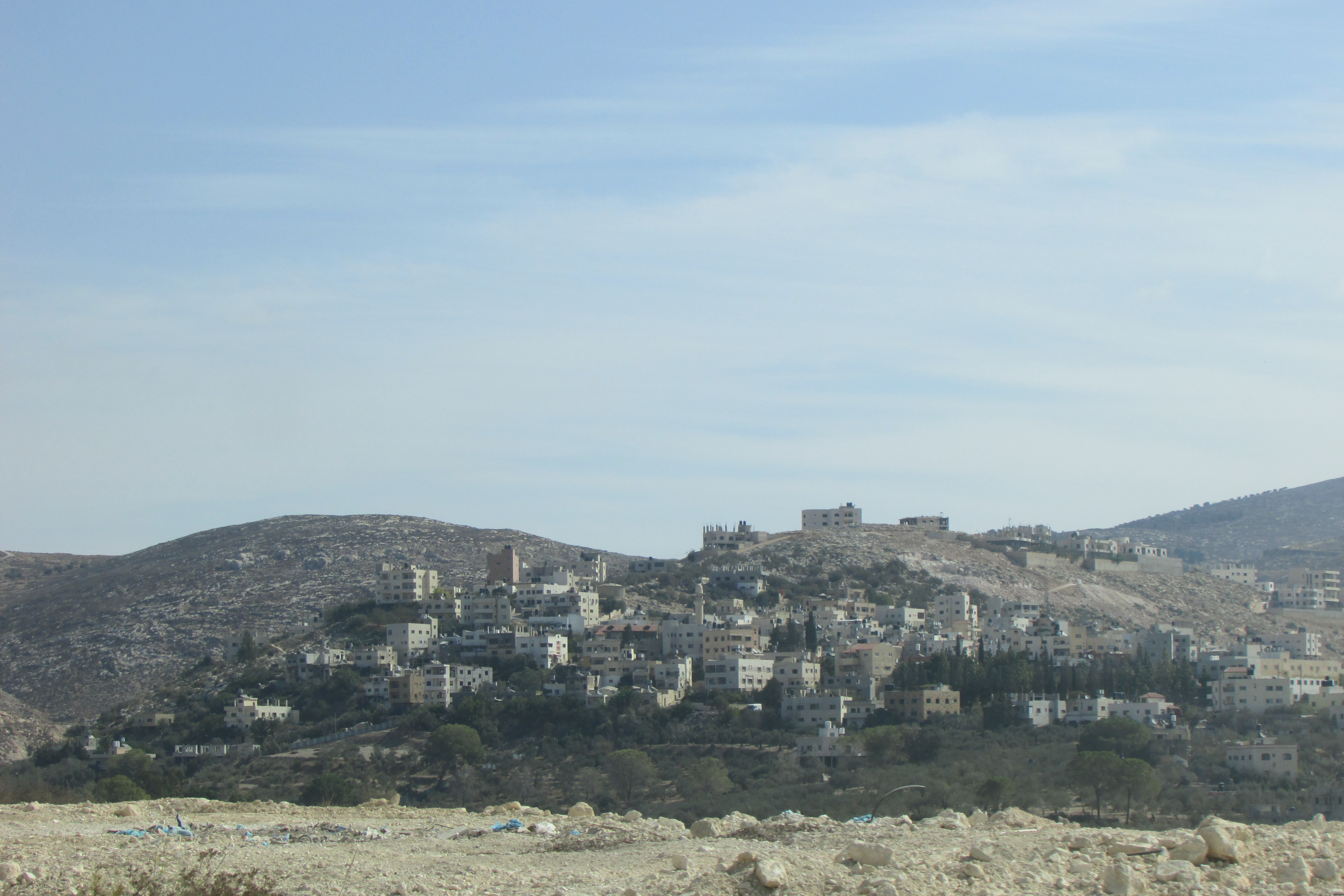
- Zawata, 2016

- Location of Zawata within Palestine
- Coordinates: 32°14′45″N 35°13′34″E
- Palestine grid: 171/183
- State: State of Palestine
- Governorate: Nablus

Government
  - Type: Village council

Population (2017)
  - Total: 2,537
- Name meaning: Zawata, personal name

Zawata (Arabic: زواتا) is a town in the Nablus Governorate in the northern West Bank, Palestine, located 6 kilometers northwest of Nablus. According to the Palestinian Central Bureau of Statistics (PCBS), the town had a population of 2,537 inhabitants in 2017.

== Location ==
Zawata is located 4.4 km north of Nablus. It has Ijnisinya and ‘Asira ash Shamaliya to the east, Ijnisinya and An Naqura to the north, An Naqura and Beit Iba to the west, and Beit Iba and Nablus to the south.

== History ==
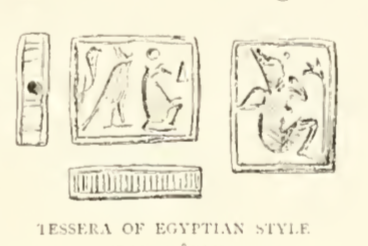
Tessera, got at Zawata

Clermont-Ganneau found here tessera, probably from the Ptolemaic period.

Pottery sherds from the late Roman, Byzantine, early Muslim and the Medieval eras have been found here.

=== Ottoman era ===
Zawata, like all of Palestine was incorporated into the Ottoman Empire in 1517. In the 1596 tax registers, it was part of the nahiya ("subdistrict") of Jabal Sami, part of the larger Sanjak of Nablus. It had a population of 11 households, all Muslims. The inhabitants paid a fixed tax rate of 33,3% on agricultural products, including wheat, barley, summer crops, olive trees, goats and beehives, in addition to occasional revenues and a press for olive oil or grape syrup, and a fixed tax for people of Nablus area; a total of 6,944 akçe.

According to Jaussen, Zawata was resettled in the 19th century. Some of its residents have origins in Ni'ilin.

In 1838, Edward Robinson noted Zawata ‘’on the hill-side,’’ part of the Jurat 'Amra district, south of Nablus.

In 1870, Victor Guérin noted Zaouata as "a village on a high hill with white limestone slopes, some used for quarrying. The number of the inhabitants is 300. Below the hill a rich spring, 'Ain Zawata, supplies water to the village and irrigates a small valley. During our visit large herds of sheep were crowding around the spring."

In 1870/1871 (1288 AH), an Ottoman census listed the village in the nahiya (sub-district) of Wadi al-Sha'ir.

In 1882, the PEF's Survey of Western Palestine (SWP) described Zawata as: "a village of moderate size, on a hill, with springs in the valley to the north."

=== British mandate era ===
In the 1922 census of Palestine conducted by the British Mandate authorities, Zawata had a population of 214 Muslims, increasing in the 1931 census, to 247 Muslims, in 73 houses.

In the 1945 statistics the population was 330 Muslims, while the total land area was 3,558 dunams, according to an official land and population survey. Of this, 13 dunams were for citrus and bananas, 334 for plantations and irrigable land, 1,842 for cereals, while 31 dunams were classified as built-up areas.

=== Jordanian era ===
In the wake of the 1948 Arab–Israeli War, and after the 1949 Armistice Agreements, Zawata came under Jordanian rule.

In 1961, the population of Zawata was 466.

=== Post 1967 ===
Since the Six-Day War in 1967, Zawata has been under Israeli occupation, and according to the Israeli census of that year, the population of Zawata stood at 591, of whom 28 were registered as having come from Israel.

After the 1995 accords, 31% of Zawata land is defined as Area A land, 32% is Area B land, while the remaining 37% is defined as Area C. Part of the village land has been confiscated for the construction of an Israeli military road. This road also cuts off Zawata from its northernmost land.

== Bibliography ==
- Barron, J.B., ed. (1923). Palestine: Report and General Abstracts of the Census of 1922. Government of Palestine.
- Clermont-Ganneau, C.S. (1896). [ARP] Archaeological Researches in Palestine 1873-1874, translated from the French by J. McFarlane. Vol. 2. London: Palestine Exploration Fund.
- Conder, C.R.; Kitchener, H.H. (1882). The Survey of Western Palestine: Memoirs of the Topography, Orography, Hydrography, and Archaeology. Vol. 2. London: Committee of the Palestine Exploration Fund.
- Government of Jordan, Department of Statistics (1964). First Census of Population and Housing. Volume I: Final Tables; General Characteristics of the Population (PDF).
- Government of Palestine, Department of Statistics (1945). Village Statistics, April, 1945.
- Guérin, V. (1875). Description Géographique Historique et Archéologique de la Palestine (in French). Vol. 2: Samarie, pt. 2. Paris: L'Imprimerie Nationale.
- Hadawi, S. (1970). Village Statistics of 1945: A Classification of Land and Area ownership in Palestine. Palestine Liberation Organization Research Center.
- Hütteroth, W.-D.; Abdulfattah, K. (1977). Historical Geography of Palestine, Transjordan and Southern Syria in the Late 16th Century. Erlanger Geographische Arbeiten, Sonderband 5. Erlangen, Germany: Vorstand der Fränkischen Geographischen Gesellschaft. ISBN 3-920405-41-2.
- Mills, E., ed. (1932). Census of Palestine 1931. Population of Villages, Towns and Administrative Areas. Jerusalem: Government of Palestine.
- Palmer, E.H. (1881). The Survey of Western Palestine: Arabic and English Name Lists Collected During the Survey by Lieutenants Conder and Kitchener, R. E. Transliterated and Explained by E.H. Palmer. Committee of the Palestine Exploration Fund.
- Robinson, E.; Smith, E. (1841). Biblical Researches in Palestine, Mount Sinai and Arabia Petraea: A Journal of Travels in the year 1838. Vol. 3. Boston: Crocker & Brewster.
- Zertal, A. (2004). The Manasseh Hill Country Survey. Vol. 1. Boston: BRILL. ISBN 9004137564.
