= Qusin =

- Municipality type D (Village council)

Arabic transcription(s)
  - Arabic: قوصين
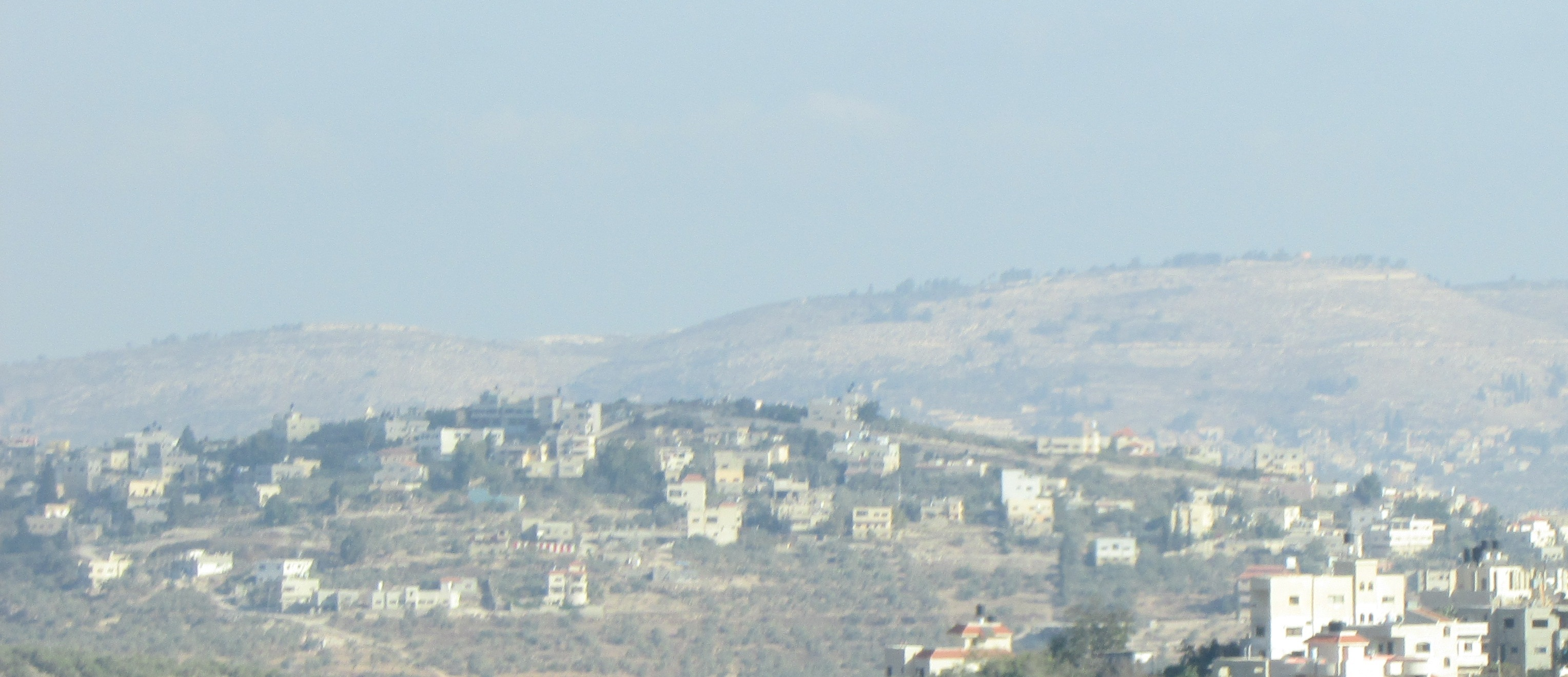
- Qusin, from the south

- Location of Qusin within Palestine
- Coordinates: 32°14′19″N 35°11′00″E
- Palestine grid: 167/182
- State: State of Palestine
- Governorate: Nablus

Government
  - Type: Village council

Population (2017)
  - Total: 2,251
- Name meaning: The two cloisters

Qusin (Arabic: قوصين) is a Palestinian town in the Nablus Governorate in northern West Bank, located 8 kilometers West of Nablus. According to the Palestinian Central Bureau of Statistics (PCBS), the town had a population of 2,251 inhabitants in 2017.

== Location ==
Qusin is located 7.7 km west of Nablus. It is bordered by Beit Iba to the east, Deir Sharaf to the north, Kafr Qaddum to the west, and Kafr Qaddum and Jit to the south.

== History ==
Ceramics from the Byzantine era have been found here.

Yaqut (1179–1229) described Kusin as a "Village in the Filastin Province, so I believe."

=== Ottoman era ===
Qusin, like the rest of Palestine, was incorporated into the Ottoman Empire in 1517, and in the census of 1596 it was a part of the nahiya ("subdistrict") of Jabal Sami which was under the administration of the liwa ("district") of Nablus. The village had a population of 15 households and 7 bachelors, all Muslim. The villagers paid a fixed tax-rate of 33,3% on agricultural products, such as wheat, barley, summer crops, beehives and/or goats, in addition to occasional revenues and a customary tax for people of Nablus area; a total of 6,300 akçe.

In 1870/1871 (1288 AH), an Ottoman census listed the village in the nahiya (sub-district) of Wadi al-Sha'ir.

In 1882, in the PEF's Survey of Western Palestine, Kusein was described as: "A village on the side of a ridge, apparently supplied by the water of the valley on the north, which has a flowing stream. A spring exists about three-quarters of a mile south-east in the valley." They further noted that: "The ruin shown near this place is merely a heap of stones."

=== British Mandate era ===
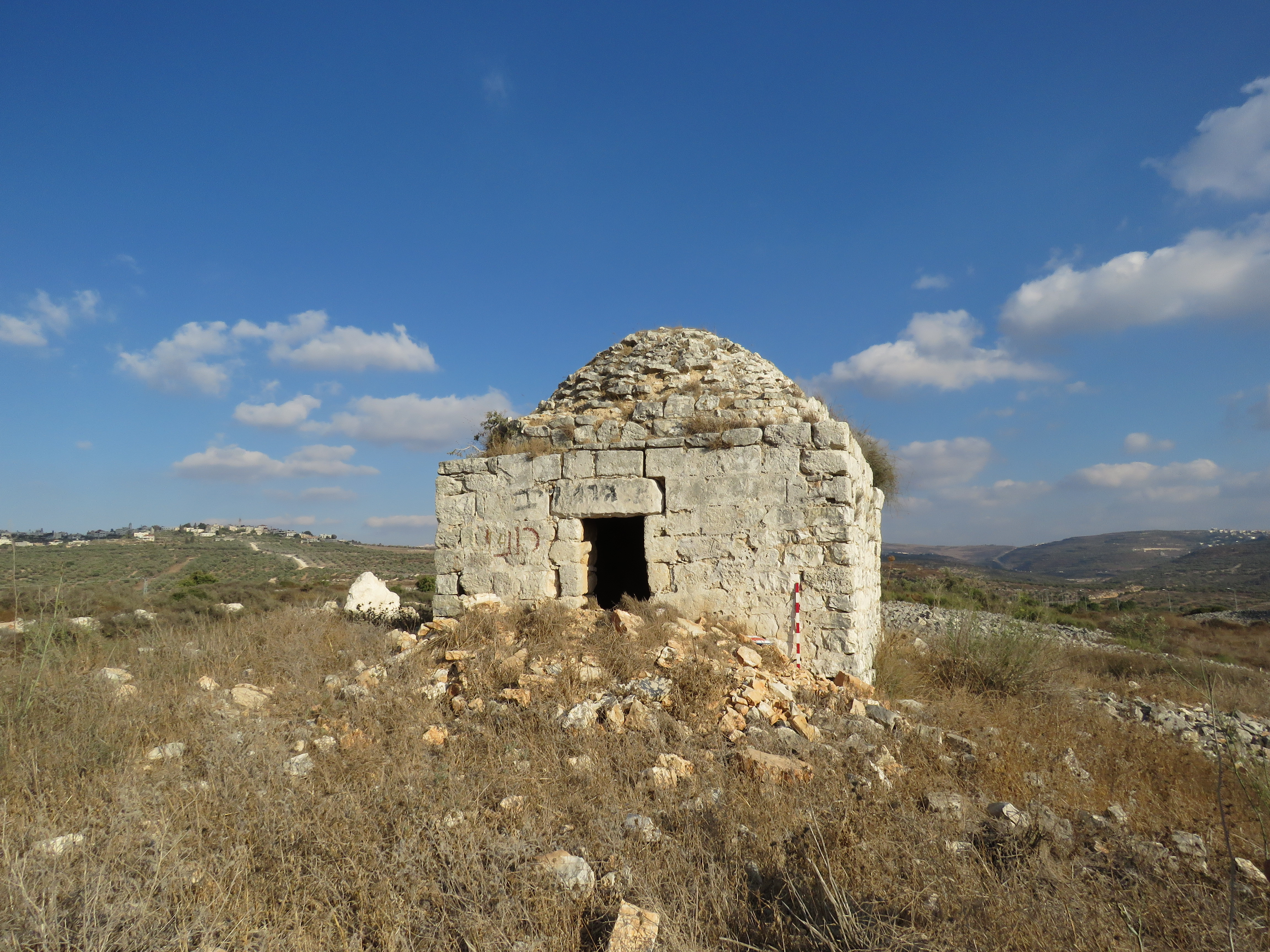
Maqam Imam Ali

In the 1922 census of Palestine conducted by the British Mandate authorities, Qusen had a population of 147 Muslims, increasing in the 1931 census to 217 Muslims, in 48 houses.

In the 1945 statistics, Qusin had a population of 310 Muslims while the total land area was 4,543 dunams, according to an official land and population survey. Of this, 59 dunams were used for plantations and irrigable land, 3,227 for cereals, while 21 dunams were classified as built-up areas.

=== Jordanian era ===
In the wake of the 1948 Arab–Israeli War, and after the 1949 Armistice Agreements, Qusin came under Jordanian rule.

The Jordanian census of 1961 found 494 inhabitants.

=== Post 1967 ===
After the Six-Day War in 1967, Qusin came under Israeli occupation.

After the 1995 accords 51% of village land is defined as Area B land, while the remaining 49% is defined as Area C. Israel has confiscated about 500 dunham of village land for future expansion of Israeli settlements, and additional land for Israeli bypass roads.

== Demography ==
=== Local origins ===
Some of Qusin's residents have their origins in Ramin and Kafr Qaddum.

== Bibliography ==
- Barron, J.B., ed. (1923). Palestine: Report and General Abstracts of the Census of 1922. Government of Palestine.
- Conder, C.R.; Kitchener, H.H. (1882). The Survey of Western Palestine: Memoirs of the Topography, Orography, Hydrography, and Archaeology. Vol. 2. London: Committee of the Palestine Exploration Fund.
- Dauphin, C. (1998). La Palestine byzantine, Peuplement et Populations. BAR International Series 726 (in French). Vol. III : Catalogue. Oxford: Archeopress. ISBN 0-860549-05-4.
- Government of Jordan, Department of Statistics (1964). First Census of Population and Housing. Volume I: Final Tables; General Characteristics of the Population (PDF).
- Government of Palestine, Department of Statistics (1945). Village Statistics, April, 1945.
- Hadawi, S. (1970). Village Statistics of 1945: A Classification of Land and Area ownership in Palestine. Palestine Liberation Organization Research Center.
- Hütteroth, W.-D.; Abdulfattah, K. (1977). Historical Geography of Palestine, Transjordan and Southern Syria in the Late 16th Century. Erlanger Geographische Arbeiten, Sonderband 5. Erlangen, Germany: Vorstand der Fränkischen Geographischen Gesellschaft. ISBN 3-920405-41-2.
- Le Strange, G. (1890). Palestine Under the Moslems: A Description of Syria and the Holy Land from A.D. 650 to 1500. Committee of the Palestine Exploration Fund.
- Mills, E., ed. (1932). Census of Palestine 1931. Population of Villages, Towns and Administrative Areas. Jerusalem: Government of Palestine.
- Palmer, E.H. (1881). The Survey of Western Palestine: Arabic and English Name Lists Collected During the Survey by Lieutenants Conder and Kitchener, R. E. Transliterated and Explained by E.H. Palmer. Committee of the Palestine Exploration Fund.
