= Aşağı Surra =

- Municipality
- Location within Azerbaijan
- Coordinates: 39°29′06″N 49°00′34″E
- Country: Azerbaijan
- Rayon: Neftchala

Population
  - Total: 4,338
- Time zone: UTC+4 (AZT)
  - Summer (DST): UTC+5 (AZT)

Aşağı Surra (also Ashaga-Sura or Ashagy Surra) is a village and municipality in the Neftchala Rayon of Azerbaijan. It has a population of 4,338.
