= Surra, Sabirabad =

Surra
- Municipality
- Location within Azerbaijan
- Coordinates: 40°04′38″N 48°31′14″E
- Country: Azerbaijan
- Rayon: Sabirabad

Area
  - Total: 189 km^{2} (73 sq mi)

Population
  - Total: 1,272
- Time zone: UTC+4 (AZT)
  - Summer (DST): UTC+5 (AZT)
- Area code: +994 2123 64

Surra is a village and municipality in the Sabirabad Rayon of Azerbaijan. It has a population of 1,297.
