= Surra, Shabran =

Surra
- Municipality
- Location within Azerbaijan
- Coordinates: 41°11′N 48°58′E
- Country: Azerbaijan
- Rayon: Davachi

Population
  - Total: 463
- Time zone: UTC+4 (AZT)
  - Summer (DST): UTC+5 (AZT)

Surra is a village and municipality in the Davachi Rayon of Azerbaijan. It has a population of 463.
