= Jezreel Valley railway =

Former railway line in Ottoman and Mandatory Palestine

Coordinates: 32.638444°N 35.228525°E

- خط سكة حديد حيفا – درعا (Arabic) רַכֶּבֶת הָעֵמֶק (Hebrew)
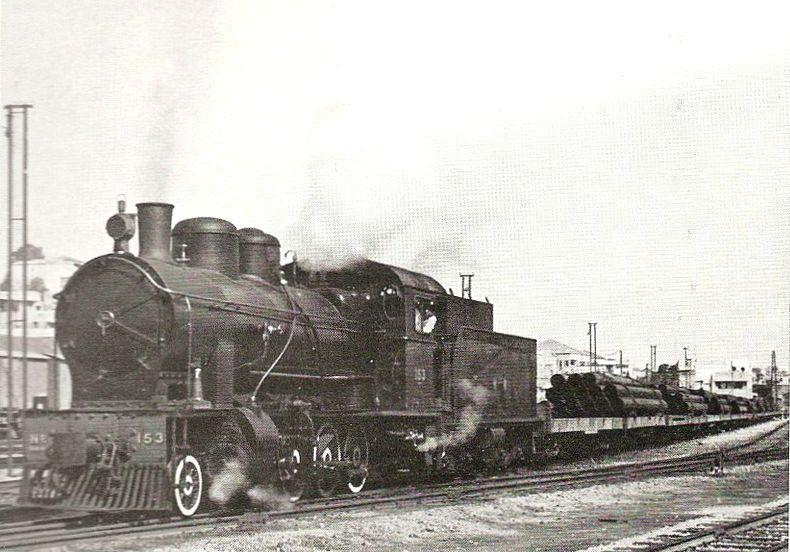
- Locomotive built by Swiss Locomotive and Machine Works employed by the Valley Train, 1946

Overview
- Locale: Ottoman and Mandatory Palestine
- Dates of operation: 1905–1948
- Successor: New Jezreel Valley railway (2016-present)

Technical
- Track gauge: 1,435 mm (4 ft 8 1/2 in) (modern)
- Previous gauge: 1,050 mm (3 ft 5 11/32 in) (historic)

The Jezreel Valley railway, or the Valley Train (Hebrew: רַכֶּבֶת הָעֵמֶק, Rakevet HaEmek; Arabic: خط سكة حديد حيفا – درعا, romanized: khaṭṭ sikkat ḥadīd Ḥayfa–Dar‘a) was a railroad that existed in Ottoman and British Palestine in 1905 until 1948. It ran from the Mediterranean coast inland along the length of the Jezreel Valley. The historical line was a segment of the longer Haifa–Dera'a Line, which was itself a branch of the larger Hejaz railway.

The historical Haifa–Dera'a line was built at the beginning of the 20th century and connected the Port of Haifa with the main part of the Hejaz railway, the Damascus–Medina line. Like the entire Hejaz railway, it was a 1,050 mm (3 ft 5 11/32 in) narrow gauge line. The last stop of the Haifa–Dera'a line within the Mandate Palestine borders was at al-Hamma, today Hamat Gader. Planning and construction took four years. The railway was inaugurated on October 15, 1905, and regular services operated on it until 1948.

Despite several renewal attempts, the line lay dismantled for decades until 2011 when construction started on a large-scale project to build a new 1,435 mm (4 ft 8 1/2 in) standard gauge railway from Haifa to Beit She'an along roughly the same route as the historic valley railway. A successor line was reconstituted as a modern railway in Israel in the 21st century. Israel Railways began passenger service on the New Jezreel Valley railway on October 16, 2016.

== Historic railway ==
=== History ===
==== Early plans ====
In the 1860s the deputy British consul in Haifa, Thomas B. Sandwit, proposed the construction of a railway from the city to Baghdad, through the Jezreel Valley, with a possible extension to Damascus. Sandwit sought to create a continuous railway link between British India and Palestine in order to increase British influence in the area, which was under Ottoman rule.

In 1865, Dr. Charles Franz Zimfel, a German-American doctor, engineer, follower of John Wroe and Zionist, proposed the creation of a railway from Jaffa to Jerusalem, which would continue to Jericho and end in Damascus, with an extension to Haifa through the Jezreel Valley. Zimfel surveyed the territory and became one of the first railway planners in Palestine.

Claude R. Conder, in his extensive Survey of Western Palestine, proposed the construction of a railway from Haifa to the Fertile Crescent. His plans constituted the basis for the actual construction years later.

Sir Laurence Oliphant of Britain, who hoped to facilitate Jewish settlement in the Gilead, proposed the creation of a railway from Haifa to that region, which would then branch out to Aqaba in the south, and Damascus in the north. From Aqaba, he hoped to further extend the railway to the Suez Canal. In his visit to Palestine in 1883, Oliphant changed his plans to what later became the valley railway.

==== Financing ====
In 1882, a group headed by the aristocratic Sursock family attained a permit for the construction of a railway in the Jezreel Valley. The family sought to build a railway there to raise land value around the line, which was mostly family-owned, and to enable the cheap transport of goods from the Hauran, also owned by the family, to the Mediterranean Sea for export.

On May 16, 1883, Sir Laurence Oliphant wrote in the New York Sun that he had met with Mr. Sursock regarding the construction of a railway in the Jezreel Valley, and claimed that he could see surveying work as he wrote, from his home in Daliyat al-Karmel. Oliphant founded a company along with Gottlieb Schumacher, one of the founders of the German Colony of Haifa, and Georg Agger of Jaffa, which would find investors for attaining a construction permit from the Sursock family, and the construction itself.

On June 13, 1883, early surveying work was completed and Oliphant began to look for investors, both in Britain and Germany. In a letter he wrote to the Duke of Sutherland, Oliphant claimed that the construction of the line was extremely important both politically and economically, that it would eventually serve as the connection between Asia Minor, the Fertile Crescent, and Egypt, and expressed fear that the line would be under sole German ownership. Oliphant and his peers advertised the line as extremely profitable for investors, estimating the gain at 34%, and promising additional permits to construct additional extensions, a modern port in Haifa or Acre, and a shipping company. For that purpose, Oliphant purchased additional lands on Haifa's coast, and in the Megiddo area.

Despite these efforts, the plans failed—the British government, the only one interested in the project, sent the Duke of Sutherland to inspect it, who refused to help sponsor the project. The Lebanese families headed by Sursock, who wished to build the railway for their personal needs, also failed to raise the necessary funds. At the end of 1884, the Sursocks' permit expired, and the 50,000 francs deposited by Oliphant's company to the Sultan Abdul Hamid II were also lost.

==== Syria Ottoman Railway Company ====
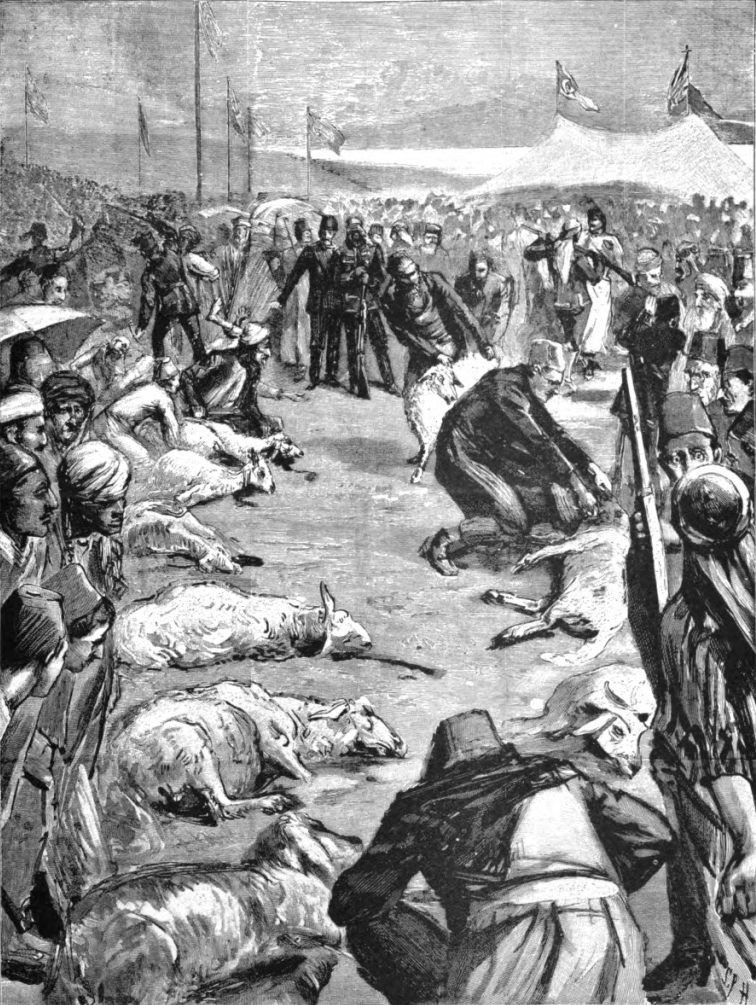
An artist's representation of the ceremony marking the start of construction in December 1892.

On May 13, 1890, the Ottoman authorities gave a permit to build a railway line from Haifa to Damascus to the public servant Shukri Bey and a Christian Lebanese engineer and effendi named Yusuf Elias, both of whom worked for the Ottoman government. The line was meant to go from Acre to Damascus with spurs to Haifa and Bosra. Elias did not have the ability to gather the funds necessary for such a project, and it was agreed that he would buy out Shukri's share and sell the rights to John Robert Pilling, a British entrepreneur. Pilling quickly founded an investment company, which was listed in the London Stock Exchange as the S.O.R. Ltd.—Syria Ottoman Railway Limited.

The S.O.R. based its plans on the original surveying work done in the area, and after a financial re-evaluation, the planned terminus was changed to Haifa, which had a modern deep-water seaport, compared to Acre's old shallow one. The planned length of the line, from Haifa to Damascus via the Golan Heights, with two extensions, was 230 km (140 mi). Twenty-seven stations were planned. On December 12, 1892, the contractor George Pauling started work on the line, after an inaugural ceremony.

Work on the line was opposed by the Chémin de Fer Damas–Hama et Prolongements (DHP), a standard gauge railway that carried freight between Damascus and Hama. The DHP did everything in its power to prevent the construction of the line in order to avoid competition. At the same time, the DHP petitioned the Ottoman government for its own permit to build a railway from Beirut to the Hauran via Damascus, eventually attaining it.

The French began building their line quickly, and finished construction in 1895, while the British worked slowly. At the time of the Beirut–Damascus line's inception, Pilling's company only managed to build a special port in Haifa to aid in the line's construction. Eight kilometers of standard gauge railroad were laid, between Haifa and Yagur, and a 20 km dike was created for the next stage of construction. Due to the competition from the French railway in Beirut, the port of Haifa became less attractive to international traders and that, coupled with strife within the Syria Ottoman Railway Company, caused Pilling to go bankrupt and lose the permit for the railway.

The construction permits were given to another British company, and another ceremony was held announcing the resumption of works in March 1895. The new British contractor, Thames Ironworks and Shipbuilding Company, restored the Jezreel dike and construction resumed. However, in 1900, the Ottomans began building the Hejaz railway, and saw the opportunity to convert the future Haifa–Damascus line to an extension thereof. In addition, because of financial disputes between the Ottoman authorities and DHP, and DHP's delaying of transporting construction materials for the Haifa line through their own railways, the Ottomans wanted to have their own railway line to the Mediterranean. In 1902, the Ottoman authorities revoked S.O.R.'s permit for a compensation of 155,000 Turkish lira.

While Sultan Abdul Hamid II's original plans for the Hejaz railway did not include an extension to Haifa, the construction of such an extension was logical in order to assert Ottoman control over the section between the Hauran and the Mediterranean Sea, and to compete against the French-owned Beirut–Damascus railway. German engineer Heinrich August Meissner who oversaw the construction of the Hejaz railway, considered the planned section immediately south of Damascus (Damascus–Muzeirib) to be useless, because of the French railway using the same route. After failing to acquire the French railway lines, Meissner signed a deal with the French that would allow a 45% discount in transporting equipment from Damascus to Muzeirib necessary to continue building the Ottoman Hejaz railway to the south.

Despite this, the French constituted a monopoly on the railway lines of the area, and canceled the discount. Their trains were also not equipped to cross the sections of railway covered by snow in Lebanon. Several months later, Meissner reconsidered, and decided to construct his own railway line between Damascus and the Hauran, close to the French line. On September 1, 1902, the Damascus–Daraa line was completed, and turned the Hauran from a remote near-inaccessible location into a transportation center with two railway connections.

Upon the initiation of the Damascus–Daraa line, Meissner realized that it was still very difficult to transport raw materials to Daraa for the construction of the rest of the Hejaz railway, as most of the materials came with ships via the Mediterranean. Meissner decided in 1902 that there was no choice but to build an extension connecting the new railway to a Mediterranean port nearby. Haifa was chosen for its already developed port, and because surveying, planning and some construction work for a railroad had already been done on the proposed route.

==== Construction ====
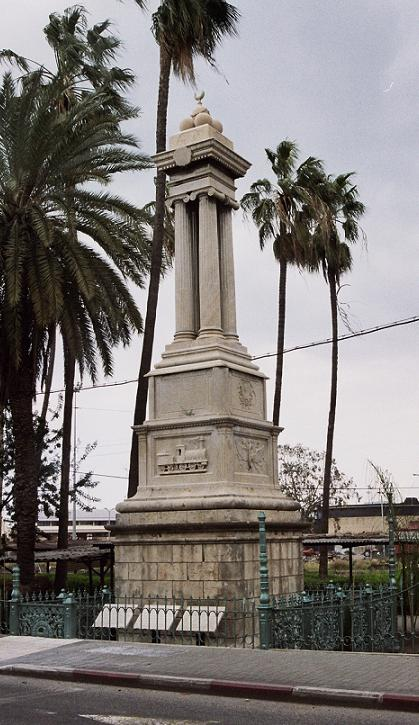
The monument to Abdul Hamid II in Haifa

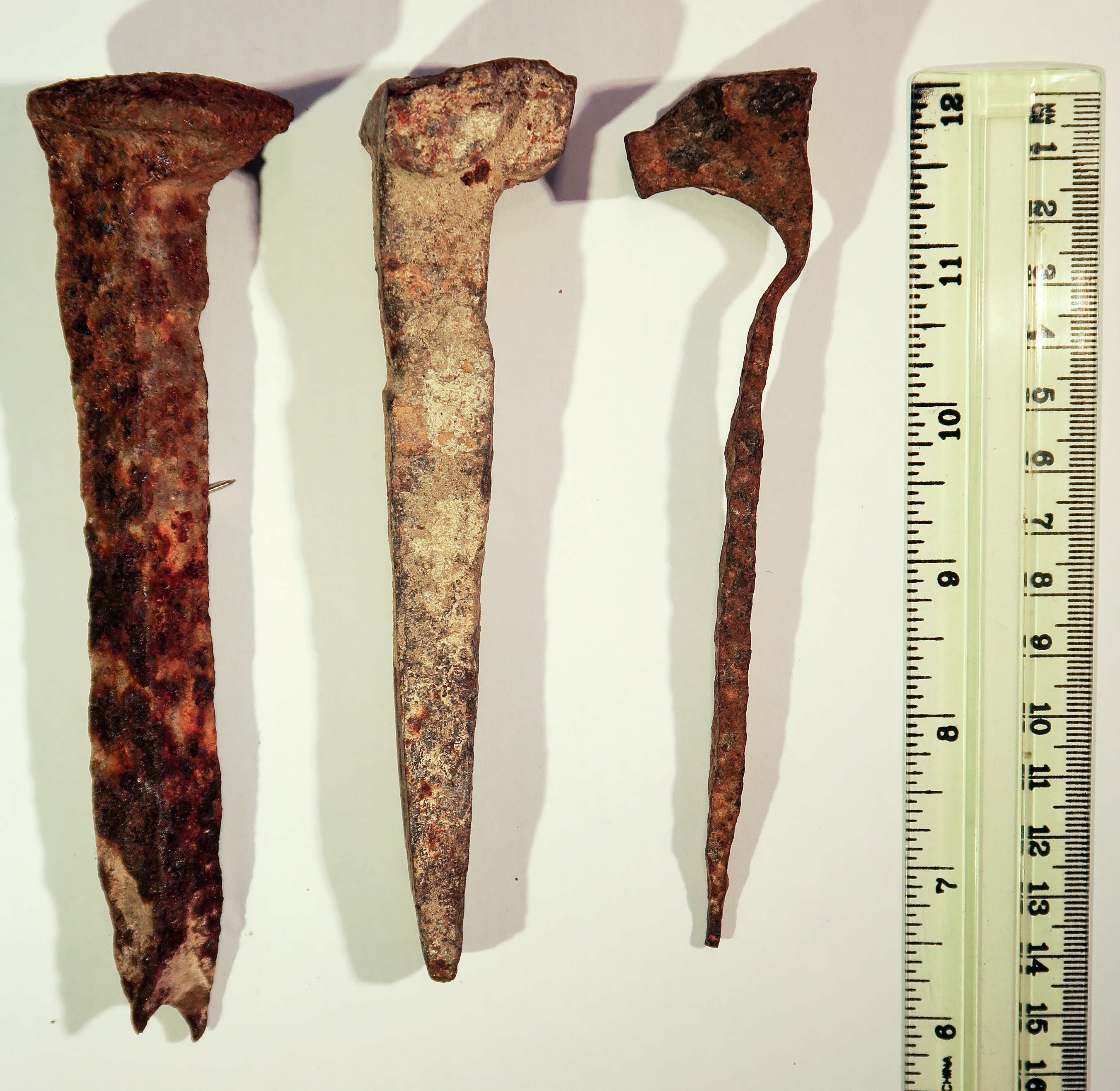
Spikes of the old Jezreel Valley railway, found near Kfar Baruch (Israel).

Construction plans for the valley train were based on the earlier British plans. Originally, the line was meant to climb the Golan Heights next to the Samakh Stream, although later it was decided that the Yarmouk River would make a better route. In 1902, the Ottomans revoked the construction permit of the British company S.O.R., compensated them, and immediately started construction. The first phase was to narrow the gauge to the Ottoman standard in the 9 km already built by S.O.R.

In 1903, track laying began between Haifa and Daraa. The biggest challenge was the construction east of Samakh (Samakh–Daraa). The length of this section was 73 km and the height difference was 529 m. Eight tunnels were dug for the section, totalling a length of 1,100 m and 329 bridges and aqueducts. These difficulties raised the price of the Haifa extension by tens of percents. A meter on the Damascus–Daraa section had an average cost of 2,070 Turkish liras, while a meter on the Daraa–Haifa line cost 3,480 liras.

The line was finally opened with 5 stations in January 1904, between Haifa and Beysan. On October 15, 1905, the entire Haifa–Daraa section opened, with 8 stations within Ottoman Palestine. On the opening ceremony, when the first train left Haifa for Damascus, a monument for Abdul Hamid II was unveiled in Haifa, which stands to this day. The monument was built in Turkey at least two years before this ceremony, and was brought to Palestine by sea.

==== Under Ottoman rule ====
With the construction of the valley train, it served mainly for delivering construction materials from the Haifa port for the continuing work on the main Hejaz railway line. The Hejaz railway was built for ideological, religious, and to a lesser extent military needs, and the Ottoman authorities initially underutilized its potential as a commercial venue. Over the years however, the potential was realized and the Jezreel valley line quickly became a major competitor to the French Beirut-Damascus line for transferring products from the Hauran to the Mediterranean.

Prices dropped quickly both for passenger tickets and freight transfer. However, the Ottomans were able to lower the prices more because they did not have to pay dividends and did not require as high a profit. This caused the valley line to become favorite among exporters in the Hauran, to the point that many of them preferred to send their goods through the valley line to Haifa and ship them to Beirut, rather than send them directly to Beirut over the French railway.

The valley line quickly became the most profitable section of the Hejaz railway, and passenger traffic consequently increased as well. More trains were put into service on the line, and new technologies were utilized to shorten travel times. The railway was able to connect those locations to Haifa that were physically close, but had no road connection. The only usable roads at the time for horse-drawn carriages were Haifa–Nazareth, Haifa–Akka and Nazareth–Afula–Jenin, which left out places with high growth potential like Beisan and Tiberias.

Tiberias. which was previously completely isolated in terms of transportation, being several days' travel from Haifa, was now served by the Samakh station, which employed an ad hoc ferry that travelled a short distance in the Sea of Galilee. After World War I, a road connection was also made between Samakh and Tiberias, cutting travel time from Haifa to a few hours.

The railway also had tourist potential. In 1906, Thomas Cook & Son travel agency advertised trips to the Holy Land utilizing the valley line. A notable package was a trip using the valley line from Haifa to Samakh, where the tourists would take a steam boat to Tiberias via the Sea of Galilee and explore the Christian holy sites around the lake. When the line became popular with tourists, the travel conditions were improved in order to make a good first impression to dignitaries and aristocrats from all over Europe. In 1912, first and second class cars were introduced.

The increase in train frequency and lack of proper inspection led to numerous railway disasters. On July 7, 1909, for example, a train leaving Haifa crashed into a train travelling from Damascus due to an error on the telegraphist's part. The driver of the Haifa–Tiberias train was killed.

Following the Haifa extension's crucial success and high demand, 12 stations were added to the line's 8 original in the first few years. In addition, Meissner began planning and construction additional extensions in Palestine and outside of it. The first was completed in 1912 and travelled from Daraa to Bosra in Syria, on a new 33 km route. In the end of 1912, an extension to Acre was completed from the Balad al-Sheikh station, totalling 17.8 km.

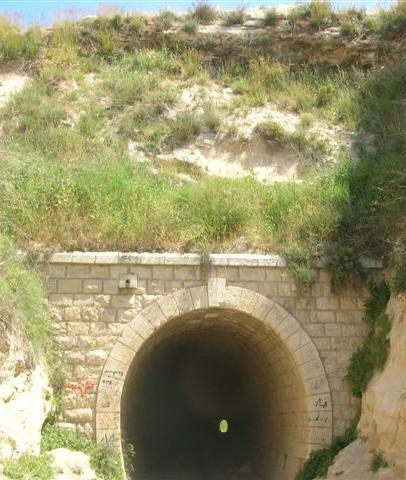
A disused 200m-long railway tunnel near Ramin

The most important extension was a connection between Afula and Jerusalem. Its construction started in 1912, and the first 17 km section was completed at the beginning of 1913, connecting Afula with Jenin. Meissner's full plan never bore fruit however, because of the French government's extreme pressure on the Ottoman government to cancel the project, which would compete with the French-owned Jaffa–Jerusalem railway. By 1914, only 40 km were built from Afula, and the line terminated near the village Silat ad-Dhahr (Sileh). During World War I, the southward connection became essential for supplying the troops in the Sinai Peninsula, so from January 1915, the construction continued, reaching Nablus in the spring of 1915. At this point, the original plan for a southward line to Jerusalem was no longer relevant, and instead, from a junction at Mas'udiya near Sebastia the construction continued westward to Tulkarm and from there southward, reaching Lydda in the summer of 1915, and Beersheba in October 1915. In the same year, the existing railway between Lydda and Jerusalem was converted from metre gauge to 1,050 mm gauge, to enable interoperation with the new Afula–Beersheba railway. Its section between Tulkarm and Lydda became known as the Eastern Railway and remained in active use until 1969, even though the rest of the Afula–Nablus–Tulkarm branch line ceased operation in the 1930s.

Many more minor extensions were built, both under Ottoman and British rule, mostly close to Haifa, and served mainly industrial and military needs.

==== World War I ====
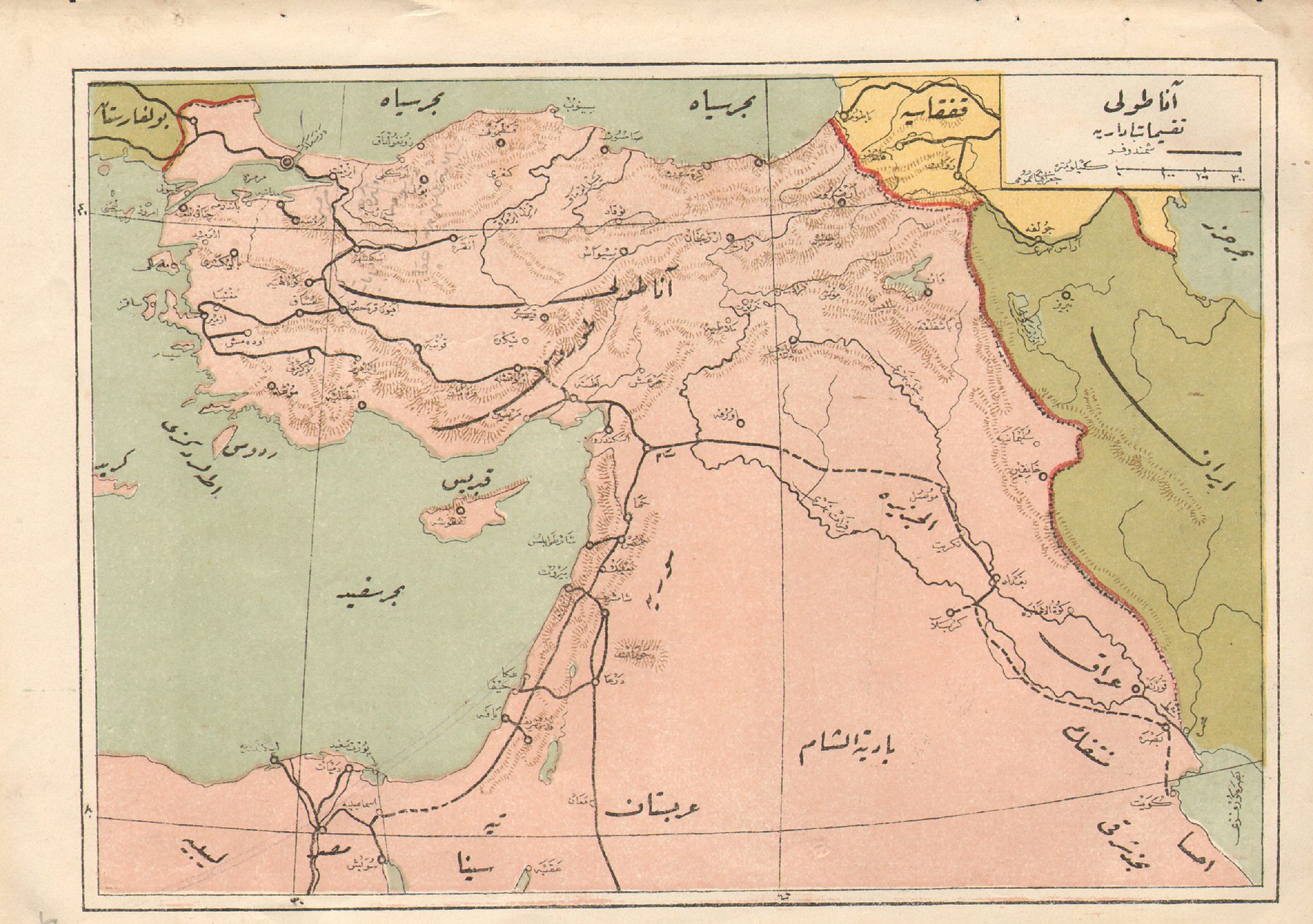
Map showing the Ottoman railways on the eve of World War I

Due to the severe lack of modern infrastructure in the Middle East during the war, the few railways in the region were of vital strategic importance to the Ottomans. The valley train, as well as the entire Hejaz line, was quickly taken over by the army and civilian use was reduced to a bare minimum. The Hejaz railway's headquarters were moved to Haifa, closer to the front, and military engineers were placed in command of each of the 3 main Hejaz sections:

- Daraa–Medina—a German engineer named Cooper
- Samakh–Daraa–Damascus—a Jewish engineer named Y. Musheli
- Haifa–Samakh—a Jewish engineer named Baruch Katinka

Britain's forces besieged the Ottoman Empire's Mediterranean ports, which led to a lack of basic provisions and maintenance supplies needed to keep the railway working. The lack of coal rendered most steam locomotives inoperable. Attempts were made to mine coal in Lebanon, but the inferior coal there caused damage to the trains. Eventually it was decided to use charcoal, and extensive logging operations were set up by the Ottomans to keep up the demand. More extensions to the line were built as a result, for the efficient transport of wood—one from Tulkarm to the forest of Hadera, and another to the Menashe Heights on the slopes of Mount Carmel near Umm al-Fahm. As these operations went on, the number of natural forests in Palestine dwindled, and the authorities ordered the cutting down of every tenth fruit-bearing tree to support the war effort.

In the late Ottoman period a railway station was established near Iraq al-Manshiyya, however, this station was destroyed in World War I. In spring 1918, the tide was turned against the Ottomans when British forces were able to take control of some key points on the railway along the Yarmouk River, and cut off the Haifa extension from the rest of the Hejaz railway. When defeated in September 1918, the Turks quickly destroyed any railway infrastructure and rolling stock they could, so that it would not fall into British hands. By the end of the war, the British controlled all of the Jezreel Valley railway.

==== British Mandate ====
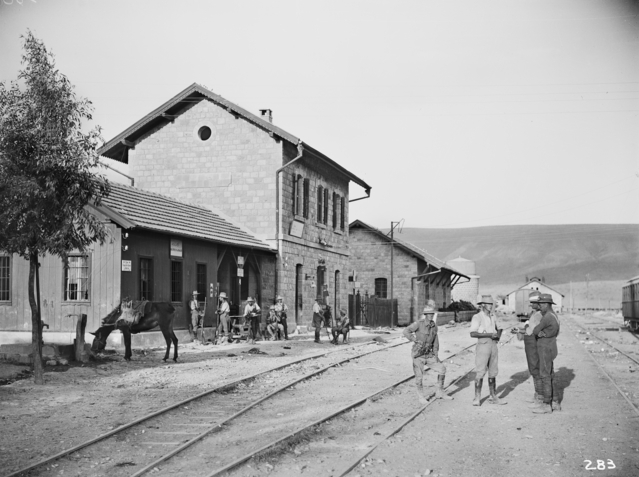
Samakh Railway Station shortly after being captured by Australian light horsemen on September 25, 1918

On October 1, 1920, the British company Palestine Railways (P.R.) was founded, which oversaw all the railways within the British Mandate of Palestine. It was a commercial company, but answered to the British High Commissioner in the mandate. The Hejaz railway's ownership was transferred by the Turks to the Waqf, out of fear of a French takeover (the French petitioned the International Court of Justice for this purpose).

After the division of the Ottoman Empire into League of Nations mandates, causing the Hejaz railway to be split between British and French rule, it was agreed that the Samakh/Tzemah station would denote the railway border between the British and French mandates, even though the more isolated al-Hamma station was physically also under British control.

The rolling stock left by the Ottomans was divided between the British and French, who had no intention of producing new rolling stock fit for the Ottoman narrow gauge railways. The only trains produced by the British for this railway were two multiple units from Sentinel Waggon Works and Cammell Laird, imported in 1929.

The frequency of trains increased again during British rule, to two daily trains from Haifa to Samakh (one of which continued to Damascus), three daily trains on the Acre extension (Balad al-Sheikh–Acre), and one weekly train from Haifa to Nablus, via Afula. The line remained its commercial role after the region was divided. It gave Damascus a route to the sea outside French control, French transport rates were high, so merchants shipped wheat to Haifa rather than Beirut. About half of the wheat was sent on to the ports in the French mandate. In 1923 the French High Commissioner made the Damas, Hama et Prolongement company cut its rates by a third. This brought the Damascus-Beirut price down to 60 percent of the Damascus-Haifa price. During World War II, the frequency reached its peak, at 6 daily trains from Haifa to Samakh and back. The tourist packages were also improved, now also including flights on Imperial Airways aircraft, which could land in the Sea of Galilee.

==== Post-World War II ====
After the perceived British betrayal of Jewish interests after World War II, leaders of various Jewish underground organizations in Mandate Palestine founded The Jewish Resistance Movement. One of the resistance's first operations was the Night of the Trains (November 1, 1945), in which 153 points along various railways were damaged. The main damage to the valley line at a railway switch near the Afula station. Rehavam Ze'evi participated in this bombing. In June 1946, as part of the Night of the Bridges, the Palmach blew up one of the main bridges on the valley line, between Samakh and al-Hamma, which was 130 meters in length. As a result, the Jezreel Valley railway was cut off from the rest of the Hejaz line.

==== Closure ====
On March 2, 1948, Haganah forces carried out bombing raids on railways in Mandate Palestine to disable them and prevent the quick transport of supplies and personnel by the Arab armies about to invade the Yishuv. The raid on a bridge near Geva, on the 44th km of the line, shut it down completely.

The next major hit came on the eve of the Israeli declaration of independence, May 14, 1948, when Jewish forces destroyed a bridge on the Jordan River, next to Gesher. The original plan was to destroy two road bridges but the soldiers spotted the railway bridge and decided to blow it up as well.

The railroad was thus rendered inoperable, and what remained of it was transferred to Israel Railways upon the company's founding. The company made minor repairs along the line, which allowed trains to travel between Haifa and Afula. Service on the new shortened line was terminated in 1949. Two main reasons were the lack of financial feasibility, and the non-standard narrow gauge of the railway. In 1950-51, the line was used occasionally for tourism. Its last use was registered in September 1951, for training exercises by the Israel Defense Forces. In 1954, the rolling stock was dismantled and sold. An old steam locomotive and a single train car were the only remains, and are displayed at the Israel Railway Museum. A short section of the railway from the Haifa East rail yard to Nesher continued operating past 1951, having been converted by the British in the 1920s to dual gauge in order to allow standard gauge equipment to reach the Nesher cement factory, although this section too was eventually abandoned in the 1990s.

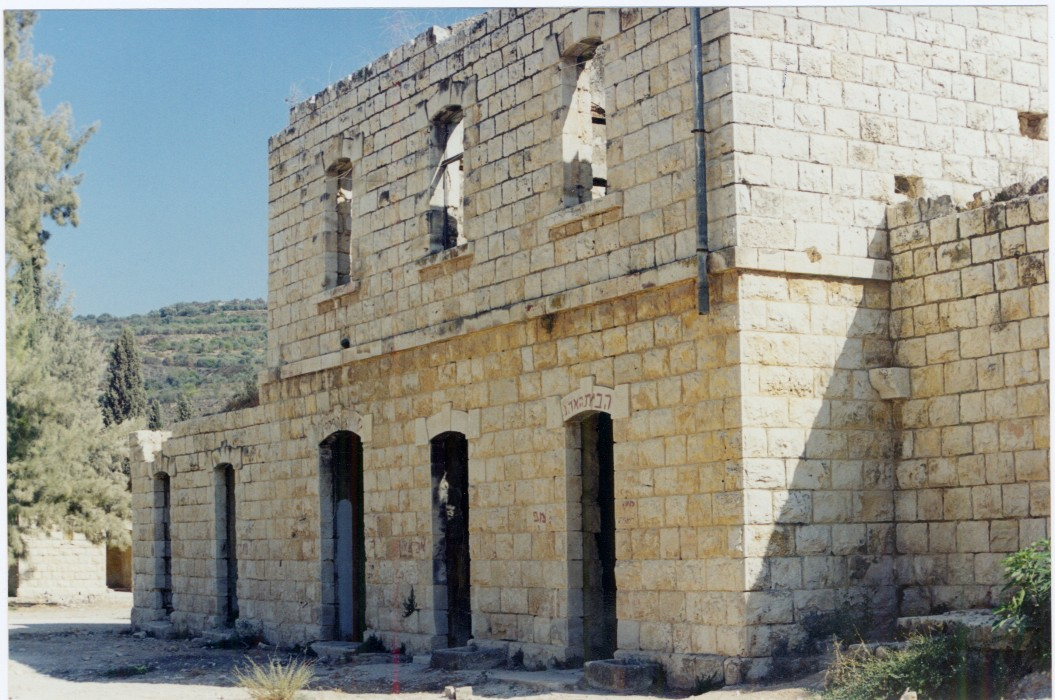
Remains of the railway station at Mas'udiya, 2002

Freight service on the branch line between Tulkarm and Nablus, stopped during the 1936–1939 Arab revolt in Palestine, recommenced in November 1944, the principal traffic being cereals from the ports to the mills at Nablus; the service was ultimately cancelled in July 1946 due to lack of demand. Following the Jordanian annexation of the West Bank in 1948, the branch line got severed from both the Eastern Railway and the Jezreel Valley railway main line, so it could no longer be operated and was dismantled. After dismantling, two segments of the branch line were paved, and remain in use as rural roads: between Bizzariya and Ramin, and from Shavei Shomron passing north of Zawata to a junction with road 5715. The disused railway station in Jenin was demolished during Operation Defensive Shield in 2002.

The remains of the railway station at Mas'udiya, originally the three-way junction on the Afula–Nablus–Tulkarm branch line, was the location chosen by Gush Emunim for the first Israeli settlement in Samaria. Evicted from Mas'udiya by the Israel Defense Forces several times between July 1974 and December 1975, and each time reassembling at the former railway station, the activists were eventually allowed to settle 8 km to the south of it, establishing Kedumim.

=== Impact ===
The Jezreel Valley railway was highly profitable and became the most worthwhile project of the Hejaz railway. Previously isolated localities such as Afula, Tiberias and Beit She'an began to develop and tourism increased in Tiberias, the Jordan River, and the rest of the Sea of Galilee area. The railway also connected the Hauran to the Mediterranean Sea, turning it into a major export hub.

The British Mandatory authorities took a different approach to the railway system in their first years of rule. They were mainly interested in assets that helped strengthen their colonial hold on the region. Few funds were allocated for proper maintenance, and unlike other railroads in Palestine, the valley railway was not converted to standard gauge. It therefore slowly became underserviced and obsolete. Nevertheless, due to the use of coal, which was imported from Britain, certain British companies supported the line's continued operation.

In the 1920s, the railway's main purpose became the transport of raw materials for construction. The first power station in Palestine, a hydroplant built in Naharayim by Pinhas Rutenberg, was mainly built from materials transported by trains using the valley railway. For that purpose, a minor extension was constructed from the main route to the construction site. In 1932, the railway was used to transport the concrete needed to build the Kirkuk–Haifa oil pipeline—38,000 tons of concrete were transported and laid on a 200 km route.

The Jewish sector in Mandate Palestine was the other main user of the railway, which allowed it to build new villages in relatively remote areas in the Jezreel Valley. The Jewish Tower and stockade organization extensively used the line to quickly bring vast amounts of construction materials to various sites to quickly establish new homes. This prompted the quick growth of the Jewish population in the area, which also used the railway as a passenger line.

The kibbutzim in the area also used the railway to their economic advantage. In 1922, Deganya asked for a special wagon to transport its dairy products to Haifa in the late night hours. Permission was granted, and gave Deganya and other kibbutzim access to other parts of the country and the world for export.

=== Security ===
As the Jezreel Valley railway became more important, it became a lucrative target for criminal and terrorist gangs in the area. Initially, attacks were mostly limited to raids by Bedouin gangs, and were comparatively a minor nuisance. However, with the outbreak of the 1936–1939 Arab revolt in Palestine, organized attacks and bombings began taking place, severely disrupting operations on the valley line, as well as other lines in Mandate Palestine.

A few months after the outbreak of hostilities, the Notrim police organization was founded, and hundreds of Jewish youth were recruited. In 1938, a regiment of the organization was diverted to protecting the railways of Palestine, known as the P.P.R.D. (Palestine Police Railway Department), or simply the Railway Guard (Mishmar HaRakevet)/Railway Corps (Heil HaRakevet) in Hebrew. The guard consisted of over 700 Jewish policemen who underwent special training in the Haganah.

The first line protected by the guard was the Lod–Haifa line, which suffered the most, although other lines were integrated later, including the valley line. The policemen erected watchtowers and conducted frequent patrols in search of the guerillas. Two designated armored train cars were built for the guard by the Ford Motor Company, which could move faster than conventional trains, and in both directions. The Railway Guard sometimes took with them prominent Arab leaders on the patrols, in order to insure that the policemen were not harmed by the Arab gangs.

The Railway Guard's success prompted their stationing in other strategic locations, such as the Haifa Port. They continued serving in that capacity even during World War II, when the valley railway was fully operational and supported the British war effort.

=== Historical stations ===
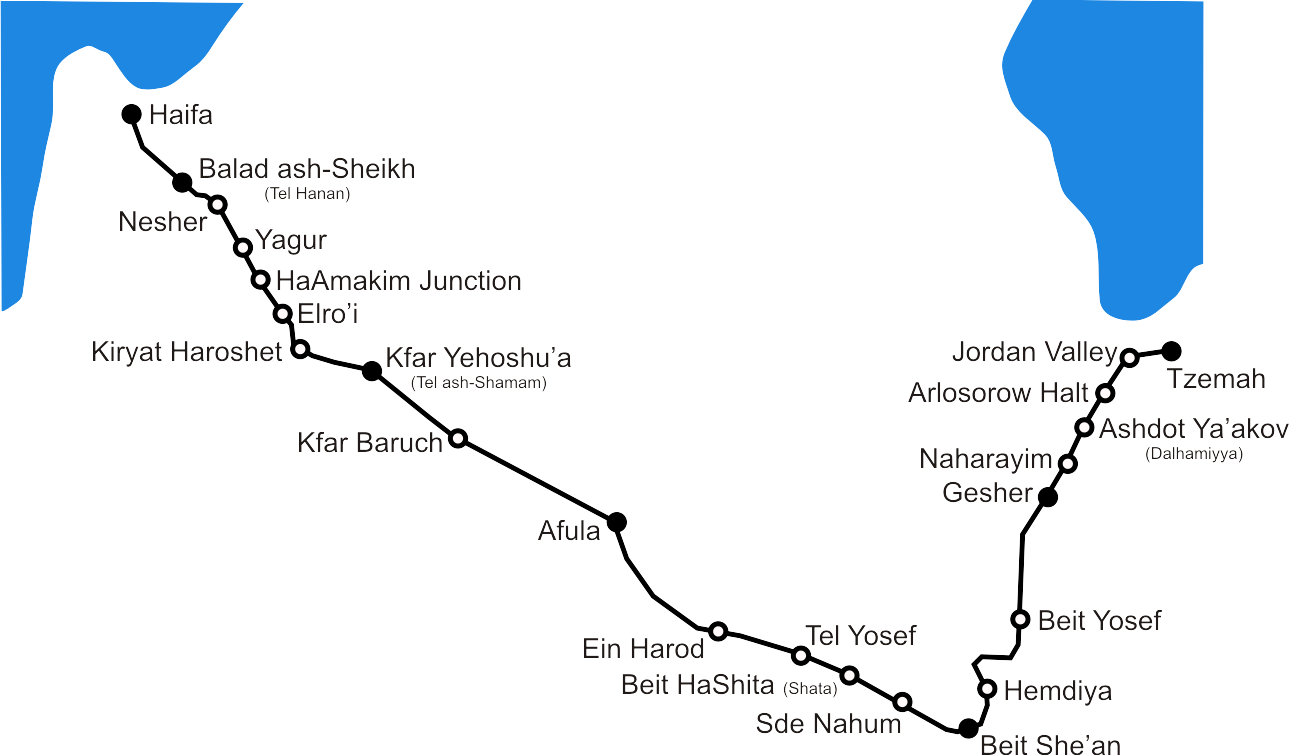
Map (not to scale) of the historical line – original stations marked by full black circles.

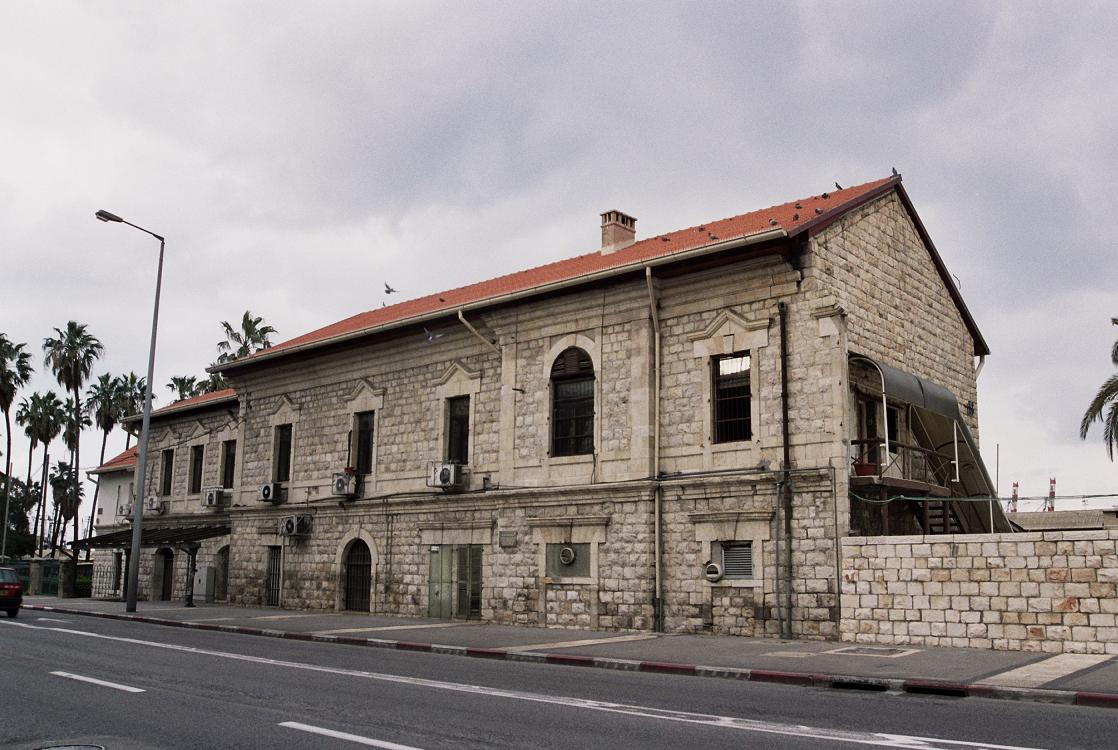
Haifa East Railway Station in 2006

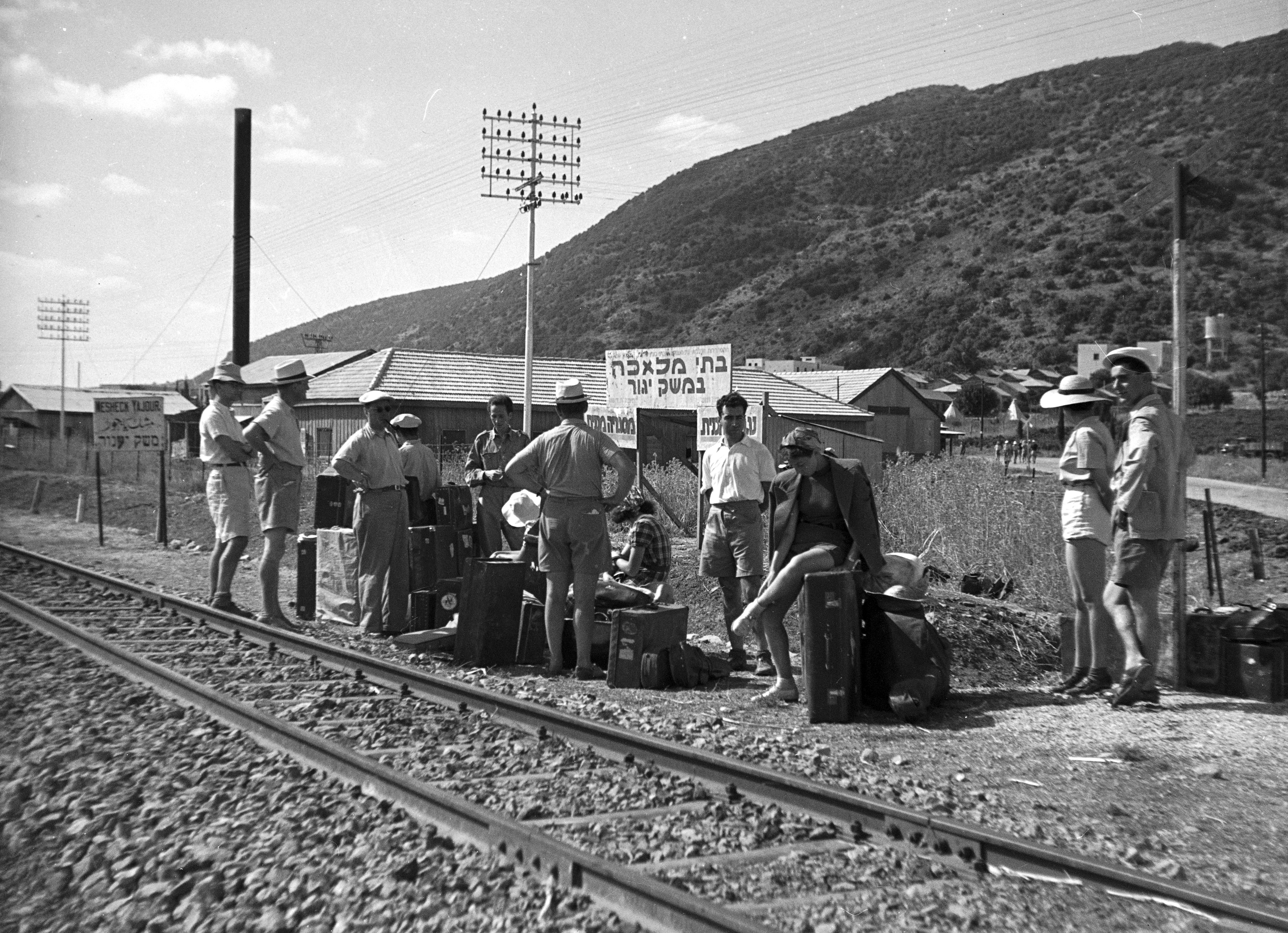
Passengers at Yagur station (1939)

There were 8 stations in the original line and numerous stations were added later. The stations are listed from west to east.

- Haifa Station

The first Haifa Railway Station was the western terminus of the line. The cornerstone for its construction was laid on July 16, 1905, just one day before the inception of the new railroad. The main building was inaugurated in 1908; its architectural style was similar to that of railway stations in southern Germany at the time, including also some Ottoman elements. It used to be regarded as the most impressive building of pre-World War I Haifa. Next to it a monument to Sultan Abdul Hamid II was erected, designed by the sultan's chief palace architect, the Italian Raimondo Tommaso D'Aronco. The Haifa station was the only railway station in the world serving the lines of 3 continents—Africa and Europe (by the coastal railway), and Asia (by the Hejaz railway). This station lost some of its importance in 1937 when, under the British Mandate, a new one was built closer to what was then the main hub of the city—its port. The Ottoman station was renamed Haifa East, while the new one was and still is known as Haifa Center.

On September 20, 1946, the Haifa East station was bombed by the Irgun. The main part of the building was destroyed. The surviving section is used today as an office building by Israel Railways, while the station does not serve as a stop for passenger trains anymore. However, the former locomotive shed ("engine house" in American English) and freight depot nearby house the Israel Railway Museum.

The British-built Haifa Center, while still operating today, has lost much of its importance too due to geographical shifts in population and business centers in the Haifa region, and was superseded first by a new railway station in Bat Galim in the 1970s, and then by Hof HaCarmel station in the city's southern outskirts in the 2000s. It is situated on the main North-South coastal line of Israel Railways and serves both intercity and suburban trains. The station is located within walking distance from the Port of Haifa's passenger terminal and from the Carmelit subway line.

- Balad al-Sheikh Station

Distance from Haifa: 4.5 km

The Balad al-Sheikh Railway Station, also known as Shumariyyah (Şumariye in Turkish) and later as Tel Hanan, was built in 1904 as the second station in the original valley line, and named after Balad al-Sheikh, the Arab village next to it.

In 1913, the Ottomans built an extension of the valley line to Acre, with this station serving as terminus. When the Haganah attacked the village of Balad al-Sheikh on the night of December 31, 1947 – January 1, 1948, an attacker named Hanan Zelinger was killed in the operation. A Jewish village, Tel Hanan (now part of the town of Nesher), was built there in his name.

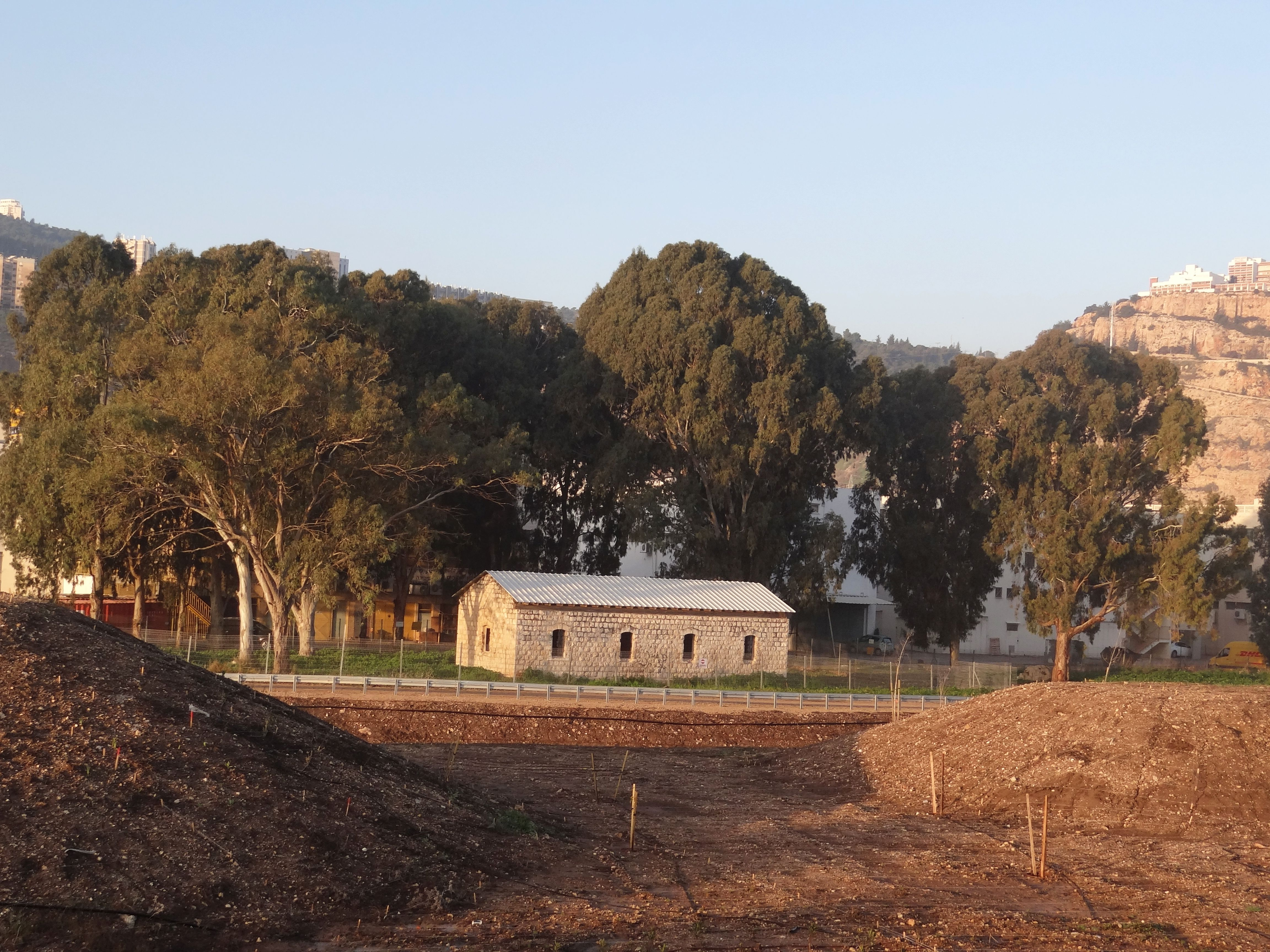
Valley train station, Nesher

- Nesher Station

The Nesher Railway Station was founded in 1925, the same year as the city Nesher, which stands on the location today. Originally, the station was freight-only and served the Nesher cement factory in the town. The freight cars were pulled from the station into the factory using a system of cables and pulleys.

The station was opened after the British converted the Haifa–Nesher part of the valley railway to dual gauge, allowing both standard and narrow gauge rolling stock to reach the station and allowing it to connect it to the rest of the nationwide rail network, much of which (except for the Jezreel Valley railway) was by then converted to or built as standard gauge. This also allowed Israel Railways to continue operating trains to Nesher until the early 1990s, the only section of the valley railway that remained in service past the early 1950s.

- Yagur Station

This station was built in the 1920s to serve the residents of Yagur, a kibbutz. The station's single stone structure stands to this day and is used for storage.

- Elro'i Station

This station, also called Al Roy in English, was built next to the Kishon River to serve residents of moshav Elro'i, today part of Kiryat Tiv'on. Originally, it was a simple wooden construction, similar to a bus stop. Later, it was converted into a small brick shed. The shed was later renovated by the residents of Elro'i. A small museum commemorating the Valley Railway now exists at the site.

- Kiryat Haroshet Station

Similar to the Elro'i station, Kiryat Haroshet was a small shed meant only to protect passengers from rough weather conditions. It was built by the British upon request from the residents of the area, even though the distance between it and the Elro'i station is less than 1 km. Today, Kiryat Haroshet is also part of the town Kiryat Tiv'on.

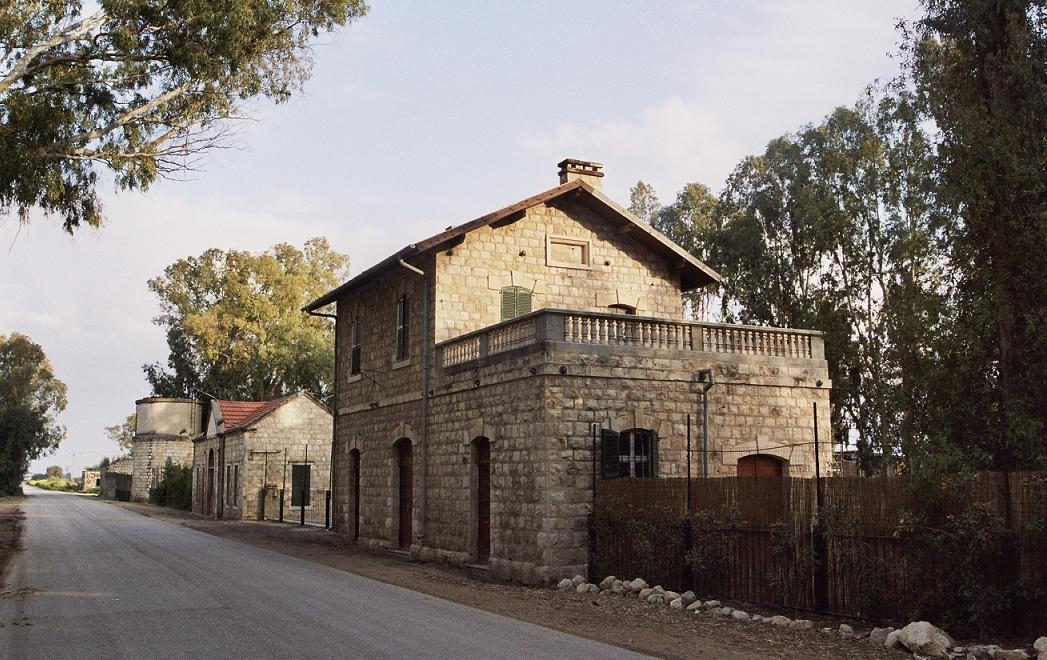
Kfar Yehoshu'a Station in 2006

- Kfar Yehoshu'a Station

Distance from Haifa: 21.8 km The Kfar Yehoshu'a railway station, initially Tel al-Shamam, was the 3rd original station of the line. The station was built in an empty area, at the time filled with swampland, and served as a service station for locomotives. The station consisted of 8 buildings in the German style, which stand to this day.

In 2005, as part of the 100-year celebration of the Jezreel Valley railway, the station underwent a renovation, and 1950s wooden cars were placed in it. There are plans to open a railway museum on its grounds, and renovate old train cars used on the railway.

A new Kfar Yehoshu'a Railway Station along the renewed Valley railway's route was opened in October 2016 approximately 2.5 km east of the historic Kfar Yehoshu'a station.

- Kfar Baruch Station

This station was built in 1926 for the residents of the moshav Kfar Baruch, to the north of the village. It was a simple shack for awaiting passengers and had neither a ticket booth, nor tickets printed for the station. Therefore, the residents had to haggle with the train conductor on the train in hopes of being let in. Today, there are no remnants left of the station.

In October 2016, a new Kfar Baruch Railway Station along the renewed Valley railway's route was opened approximately 1 km southwest of the historic Kfar Baruch station location.

- Afula Station

Distance from Haifa: 36.4

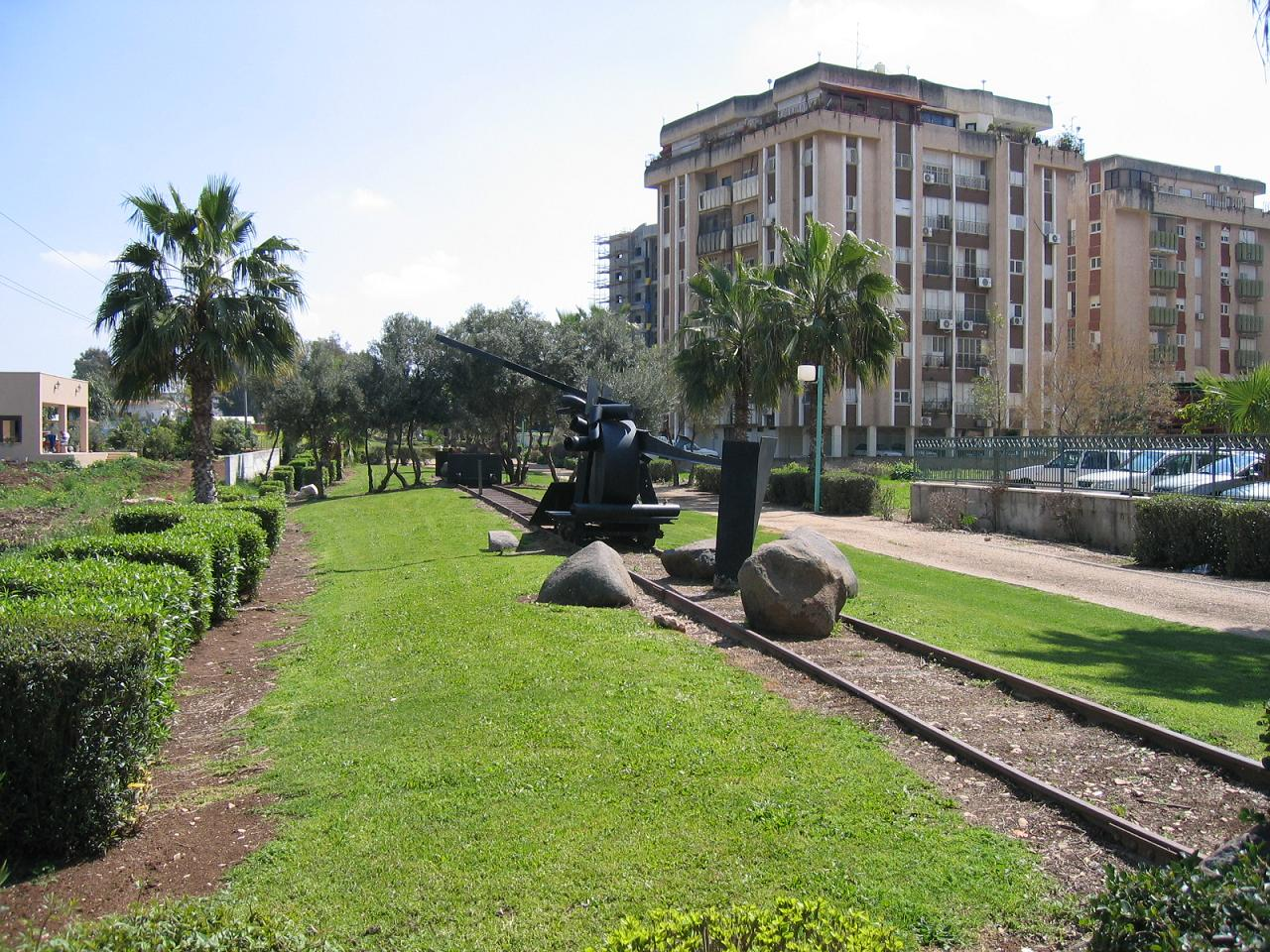
Park on the railway line in Afula, 2006

The Afula (Afule during Ottoman period) railway station was the fourth original station in the valley line. It was named after the Arab village there, al-Fuleh, until the Jewish town Afula was founded there in 1925. The station was an important crossroads and served as a terminus for the Afula–Nablus extension of the valley line, which started operations to Jenin in 1913.

The station prompted the quick growth of al-Puleh/Afula, and various civilian and military installation were built in its vicinity, including a regional post office that served the entire Jezreel Valley built in 1922.

On November 1, 1945, the station was destroyed as part of the Night of the Trains by the Jewish Resistance Movement, and has not been used since. A museum was built on the grounds of the station, commemorating the history of the Jezreel Valley railway.

As part of the renewed Jezreel Valley railway a new Afula Railway Station was built along the new railway's route, approximately 1.5 km north of the historic station's location.

- Ein Harod Station

Ein Harod was the first kibbutz founded in the Jezreel Valley (1921), and with it the small railway station. The station was called Ein Harod even after the workers of the kibbutz copied all their residences to a nearby hill in 1927. Only many years later, after a new station was created for Ein Harod (see Tel Yosef Station), the station was renamed. Initially, it was renamed to Yehezkeliya for the nearby moshav Kfar Yehezkel, but due to pressure from kibbutz Geva, the station eventually took on the kibbutz's name.

- Tel Yosef Station

This station was a small shed, built for the residents of the new Ein Harod, and for Tel Yosef. It was located next to the road junction leading to the kibbutzim. Today, nothing remains of the station.

- Shata Station

This station served the residents of Beit HaShita (It was known as Şatta during Ottoman rule), and named after the Arab name for the location. Several stone structures were built for the station, and the largest of them can be found today within the Shata Prison.

During the British Mandate period, a Tegart fort encompassing the entire station was built, and later converted into the Shata Prison by the Israel Prison Service.

In 2003, the station's structures were renovated by the prisoners in Shata. These renovations were not according to the original architectural design, but no major damage was done to the station. Until then, the station served as the prison's carpentry, but since the refurbishment, it is used for offices and storage.

- HaSade Station

This station served the residents of Sde Nahum (originally called Kibbutz HaSade). The station was created in 1934 for the residents of the village, who feared using the Arab Beisan station during the 1936–1939 Arab revolt in Palestine. This 'station' consisted only of a trilingual sign, without any structures.

- Beit She'an Station

Distance from Haifa: 59.3 km The Beit She'an Railway Station (originally Beisan also known as Bisan) was the fifth original station and specifically ordered by the Turkish sultan, in hopes of raising property value in the area and hence tax value. However, only upon Jewish settlement in the area, did it finally see the desired growth.

A new railway terminal was built at the site as part of the reconstruction of the Valley line that opened in the fall of 2016. The new station complex includes both passenger and freight rail terminals. The construction effort also involved renovating some of the original station's abandoned structures that are located nearby the new station's buildings. Of all the new stations on the renewed Valley Railway, the Beit She'an station is the only one constructed in its original historical location.

- Beit Yosef Station

This station was built in 1937 for the residents of the moshav Beit Yosef. After it fell into disuse with the closure of the line, any structures on the station's grounds were razed and the exact location is unknown today.

- Gesher Station

The Gesher Railway Station (also Gesher Nehalim) was the 6th station in the original line, and served mainly the residents of Gesher and Menahemiya. It was located next to the Mujami Bridge (Jisr Majami in Arabic, Cisr'ul Mecami in Turkish), which when intact was the lowest railway bridge in the world at 257.5 m below sea level.

Today, the remnants of the bridge, destroyed on May 14, 1948, as well as two wooden train cars can be seen from the Gesher kibbutz, beyond the border fence although technically on Israeli territory.

- Naharayim Station

The Naharayim station was constructed near the Naharayim Power Station built by Pinhas Rutenberg in the Bauhaus architectural style. After the 1949 Armistice Agreements, the area of Naharayim was ceded to Jordan and today, the remnants of the station are located on the Peace Island within the borders of Jordan.

- al-Dalhamiyya Station

This station was created to serve the Arab village of al-Dalhamiyya. With the founding of kibbutz Ashdot Ya'akov in 1935, it began also serving the residents of the kibbutz. Like the HaSade station, this 'station' was merely a trilingual sign where trains stopped.

- Arlosorow Halt Station

The Arlosorow Halt Station was named after the prominent Zionist Haim Arlosoroff. It was built in 1937 and served the kibbutzim Masada and Sha'ar HaGolan, which were also founded in memory of Arlosoroff. This station replaced the temporary Jordan Valley Station, and a tin shack was created to protect passengers from harsh weather conditions. Today, nothing remains of this station.

- Jordan Valley Station

This was a temporary station created in 1936 in light of the 1936–1939 Arab revolt in Palestine, to allow the Jewish residents of the Jordan Valley to travel safely without going through the Arab Samakh (Tzemah) station. The station, which was funded by the Jews in the area, sported a single small sign. It was cancelled following the inception of the Arlosorow Halt.

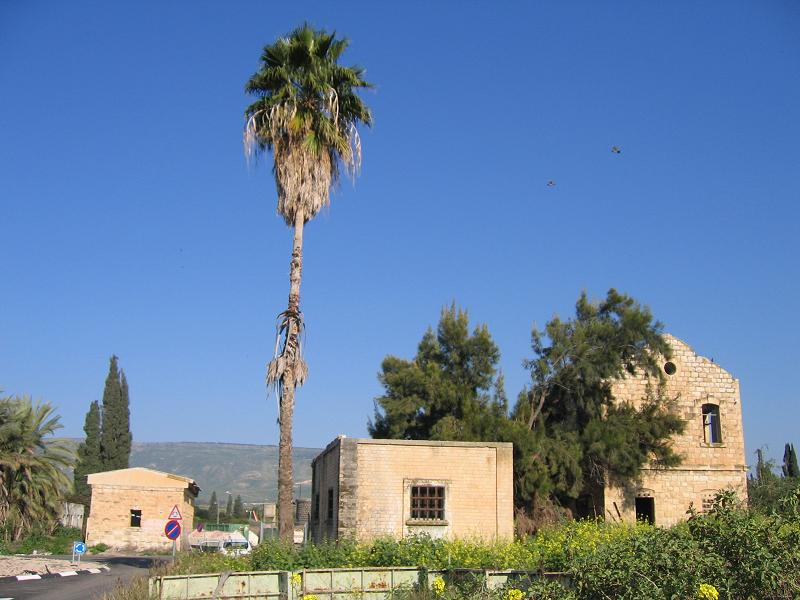
Tzemah Station in 2006

- Tzemah Station

Distance from Haifa: 86.9 km

The Tzemah Railway Station (originally Samakh) was the seventh of the eight original stations on the valley line. It served the village of Samakh, inhabited mostly by Palestinians. The station facilitated the growth of the village, which reached an Arab population of 3,460. A quay was built near the station, on the Sea of Galilee, for moving freight from the railway to Tiberias. After 1918, Samakh became the border station between British Palestine and French ruled Syria. Samakh station became a control office for passage. Travellers needed a passport from their own government and a visa from the visiting government.

The station was damaged during the 1948 Arab–Israeli War, in the Battles of the Kinarot Valley. Starting in 2011, the station is undergoing extensive restoration work.

- al-Hamma Station

Distance from Haifa: 95.3 km

The al-Hamma (now Hamat Gader, El Hüsame in Ottoman Turkish) Station was the eighth and last of the original station on the valley line. While located within the borders of what was then defined as Palestine, it was relatively isolated, and could not serve as a major transportation hub and gateway to Syria, a function that was performed by the Tzemah Station.

The station was built near the Roman bath houses of al-Hamma, and included several stone structures. These also served as the residence for the founder of kibbutz Mevo Hama, who renovated the bath houses.

Today, the station is located in Israel, near the Syrian border, and its structures are used for a fish farm. A tin sign can still be seen bearing the name of the station.

== Modern railway ==
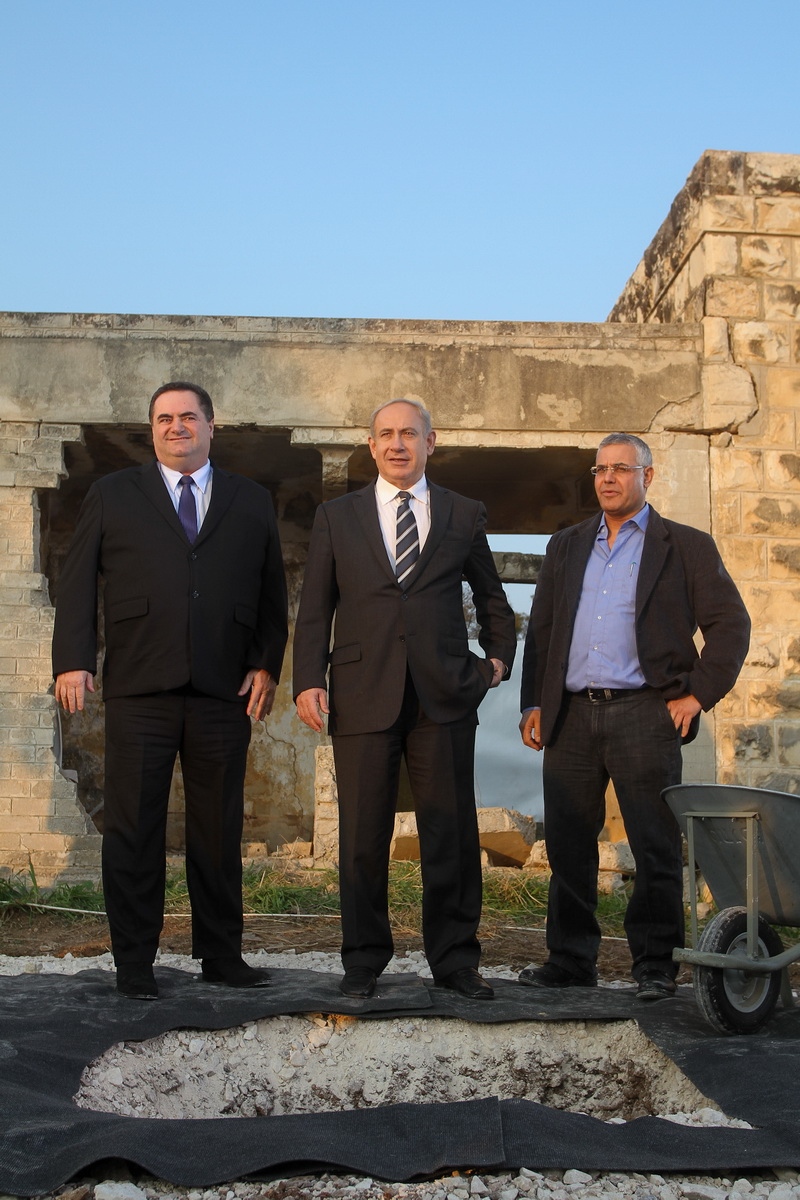
On December 30, 2012, Israeli Prime Minister Benjamin Netanyahu, Transport Minister Israel Katz and Mayor of Beit She'an Jackie Levy participated in the cornerstone-laying ceremony for the new Beit She'an Railway Station. The old station structure seen in the background, along with others at the site will be renovated and become part of the new station's complex.

The Jezreel Valley railway fell into disrepair after the founding of the State of Israel, and as the years progressed, the chances of renovating the line diminished even further. The fact that the line was the only narrow gauge line in Israel meant that its rolling stock was incompatible with the rest of Israel Railways' network, a fact that greatly contributed to the line's demise. The significant cost to convert the line to standard gauge was considered too prohibitive for the conversion to be carried out in the early days of the state. Over the subsequent decades there were several proposals to rebuild the railway along approximately the same route. None of them came to fruition, however, until 2011, when construction finally began on a renewed valley line in standard gauge from Haifa to Beit She'an, which opened in 2016.

=== Early renewal attempts ===
The first attempts to renew the historic valley line were made in the 1950s, when the possibility of converting the railway to standard gauge was examined. On June 13, 1962, talks were held between the CEO of Israel Railways Menachem Savidor and head of the Afula local council Yoash Dubnov. Savidor declared that if Afula and its suburbs could guarantee a concentration of 400–500,000 tons of freight to be moved on the railway, the project would be financially viable, and Israel Railways would support it. The plan failed. However, the land was owned by Israel Railways and not approved for building. Some municipalities turned the area of the railway lines into public parks with a billboard or monument commemorating the Jezreel Valley railway. In spite of this, the Ramat David Airbase was expanded onto a major portion of the historical line's alignment.

=== Later renewal attempts ===
In 1988, a decision was passed to renew the Jezreel Valley railway, and plans were made to alter the historical route to conform to new realities on the ground in several points on the route. However, it was not until ten years later, in 1998, that a survey of the land was made to inspect its suitability for a modern railway line, which was also not immediately used. Several years later, major foreign investment began flowing into the country following the worldwide early 2000s recession, which prompted resuming discussions about renewing the valley railway, which has regional importance for transporting goods to and from parts of Israel and Jordan via rail links for export/import through Israeli seaports on the Mediterranean sea.

On October 28, 2002, the Transportation Ministry of Israel and the minister Ephraim Sneh announced in a press release that Israel Railways started extensive planning of the valley line's renovation, at a cost of NIS 40 million for the planning stage, and an additional NIS 1 billion to be appropriated later for the construction itself. The railway would connect Haifa with the Sheikh Hussein Bridge on the Jordan River, on a 74 km route. It would later be extended by Jordan to Irbid. The original planned completion date was the second half of 2007.

In 2003, the new Minister of Transportation Avigdor Lieberman announced that in July 2005, work would start on the renewal of the line. Plans for a national infrastructure project were presented that would further alter the rail route, due to changes on the ground since the 1988 plans. These changes included relocating the Afula section to a partially underground route between Afula and Afula Illit, instead of its previous location in the very center of the city. By the end of 2005, many of the plans were approved by the Construction and Planning Committees, which called for the completion of the line by 2010. Five stations were approved: Haifa East, Nesher, Kfar Yehoshua (in a different location from the historical one), Afula and Beit She'an. Israel Railways also proposed a completely new route to connect the Beit She'an station to Jordan, via the Sheikh Hussein bridge, as well as a future revival of the historical extension to Jenin to serve the Palestinian Authority.

However, work did not start in 2003. In November 2005, there was still no progress to be seen, and the extensive planning was not fully completed. In a press release on November 30, 2005, Transportation Minister Meir Sheetrit announced that he was considering connecting Nazareth and Migdal HaEmek to the planned valley railway, and that the railway would be completed in 2008–09 (starting construction in 2006). The original plans to build a full dual-track railway in the initial phase were scrapped in favor of single-track for most of the route (between Nesher and Beit She'an). On February 22, 2006, Israel Railways and the Nature and Parks Authority transferred 1,500 endangered geophytes from the route of the railway.

=== Reconstruction and reopening ===
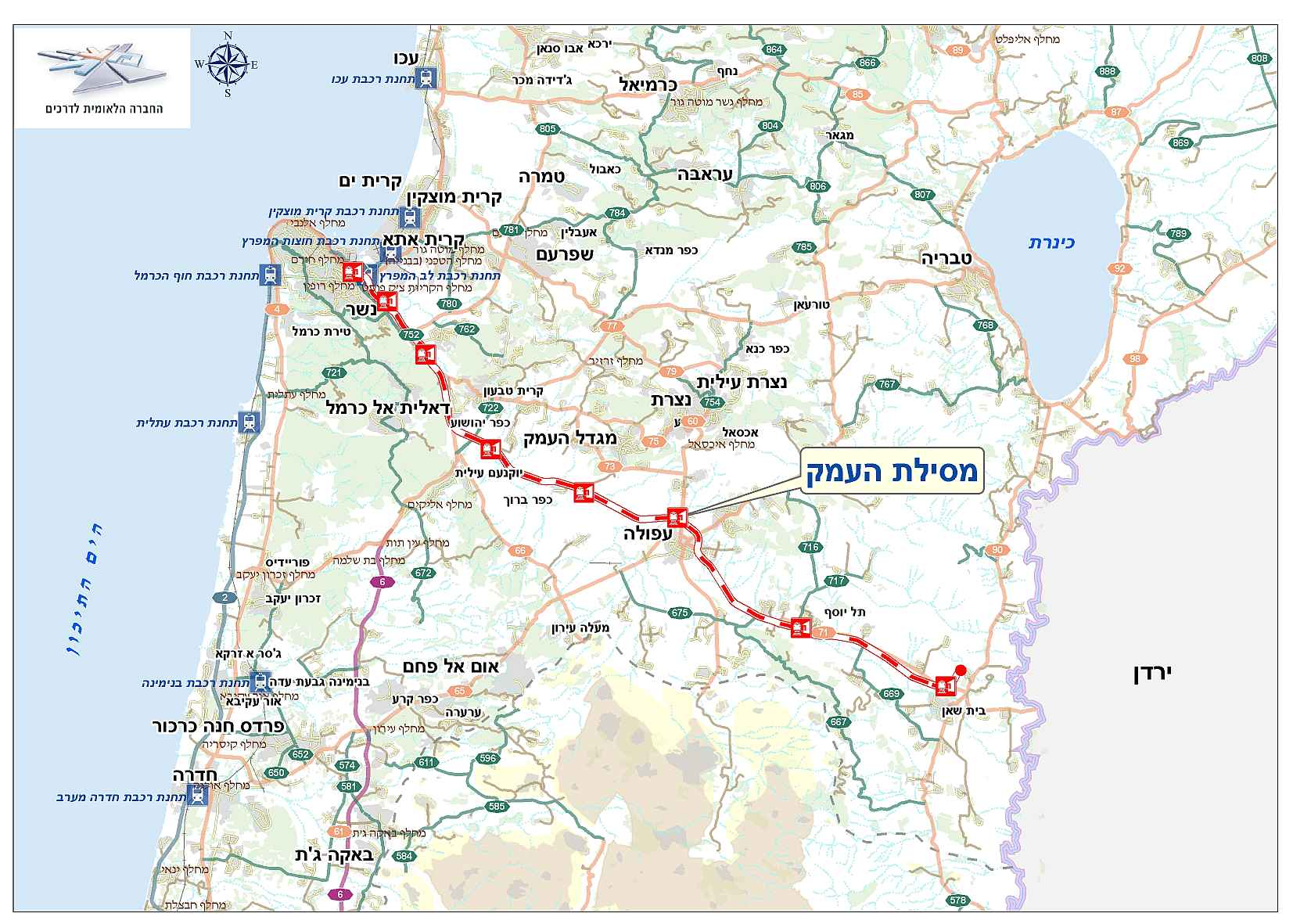
National Road Authority map depicting the renewed Jezreel Valley Railway's route.

Although the atmosphere remained optimistic over the years as proposals for the railway's revival were raised, and some Israeli railway maps even labeled the line as 'under construction', actual work did not commence on the valley railway (besides preliminary design work and right-of-way purchases). Then on February 24, 2010, the Israeli government voted to appropriate the sum of NIS 3.5 billion (later raised to 4.1 billion, equivalent to about US$1.15 billion in 2011 dollars) for the detailed design and construction of the railway between Haifa and Beit Shea'an beginning in 2011. On March 7, 2011, the National Roads Authority, which was in charge of managing the project, published a design-build tender for a 6.5 km section of the line near Afula. This was the first of a dozen tenders that the authority published through mid-2012 for the railway and five stations with overall completion of construction expected in 2016. The railway was constructed as single-track but with significant provisioning for double-tracking and electrification in a future follow-up project.

The renewed Valley Railway opened for passenger service on October 16, 2016, following several years of extensive construction activities.

=== Route description and differences from original alignment ===
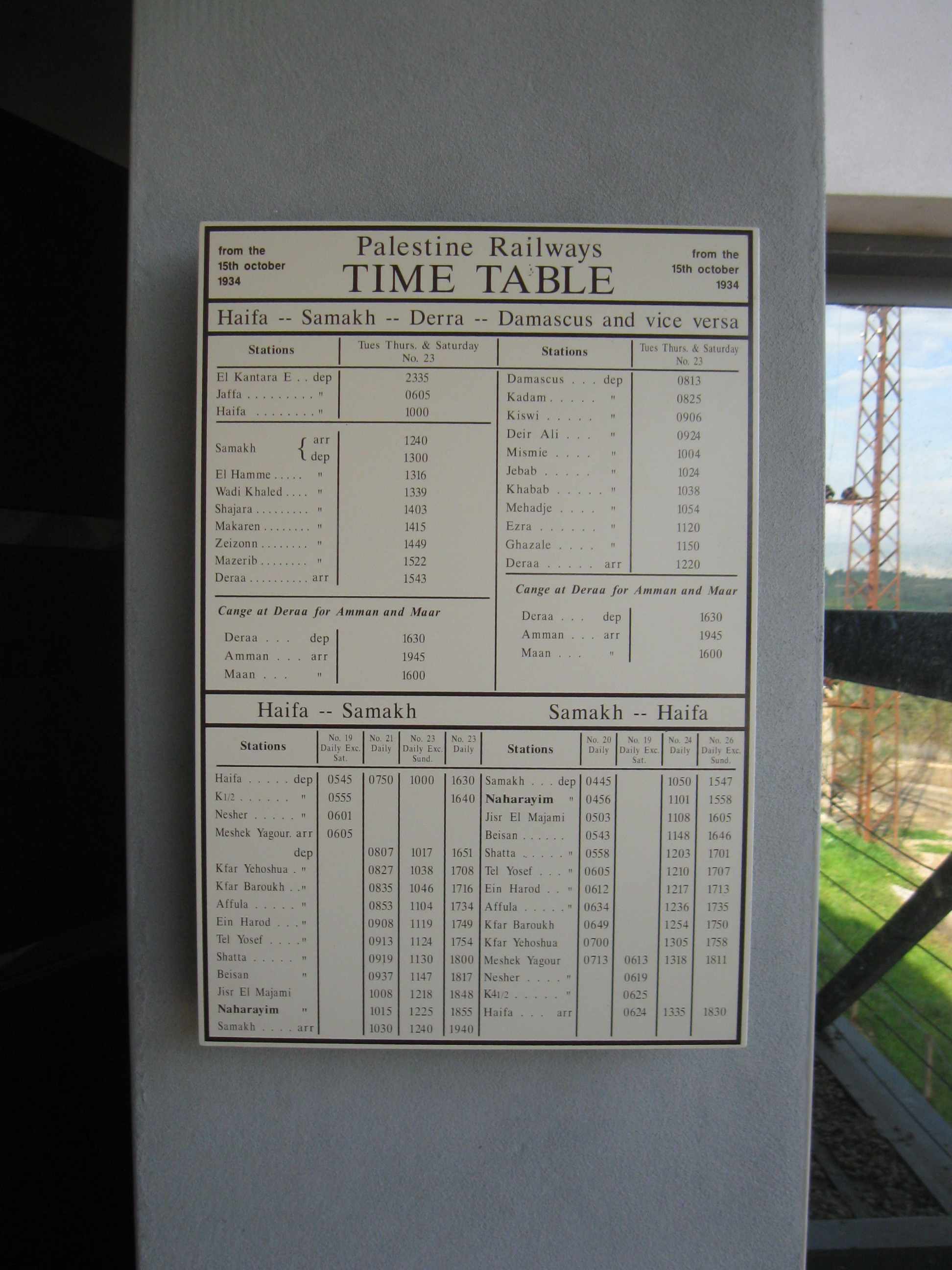
1934 timetable

When originally built in the beginning of the 20th century, the Ottomans had the advantage of constructing the railway in what was then a relatively sparsely populated area and as such had the benefit of being able to lay the railway on the most topographically convenient route between Haifa and Beit She'an. The renewed railway's route however had to contend with the significant population that settled in the area since, a complex set of existing infrastructure built up over the years, strict environmental considerations, and the wish to preserve as much open space as possible along the route. Therefore, the new route was in places considerably more difficult to construct and in some spots is also less direct than the original alignment.

The modern railway splits from the Coastal Railway several kilometers east of the Haifa East Railway Station and curves to the north on its way towards Nesher atop one of the longest railway bridges in Israel, roughly paralleling Highway 75 and spanning over Highway 4 in the "Checkpost" area of east Haifa. The historical alignment in this area however passed to the south, in a straight, ground-level path from Haifa East station to Nesher while the new alignment and 2.2 km bridge curve to the north in order to provide access to the HaMifrats Central railway station and its adjacent public transportation hub. From Nesher the railway continues southeast next to Highway 75 along the historical route until Hamakim Junction (where Highway 70 splits off from Highway 75). Between the road junction and Kiryat Haroshet at the entrance to the Jezreel valley the railway lies just west of Highway 70 along the foothill of the Carmel mountains while the original alignment in this section passed east of Highway 70 and was situated near the east bank of the Kishon River. In the western part of the valley, from Kiryat Haroshet to near Kfar Yehoshua the railway passes over a long, curving bridge over Highway 70 and the Kishon River, then joins the original route until it begins to bend south, then north towards Kfar Baruch and from there continues along the center of the valley to near Afula. The historical alignment in the western part of the valley was a straight line. The "bulge" to the south in the renewed line between Kfar Baruch and Kfar Yehosuha was necessary due to the expansion of the Ramat David Airbase onto the original line's route. From west of Afula the line again leaves the original alignment and instead of bisecting historical Afula in a straight line at ground level as the original line did, it curves around the center of the city to the north. This section includes a long bridge over Highway 60 as well as traversing through a set of tunnels nearly a kilometer in length in the area between Afula and Afula Ilit and under Highway 65 until it reaches Kibbutz Merhavia just east of Afula. From there, in the eastern part of the valley from Merhavia to Beit She'an, the railway passes just south of Highway 71, situated on or very near the historical alignment.

=== Usage statistics ===
The railway was used by 1.34 million passengers in 2018, and 1.1 million in 2017.

== Future ==
It is planned that in the future, the railway will be extended from Beit She'an to the Jordan River border crossing at the Sheikh Hussein bridge. This extension will require significant tunneling and bridging in order to overcome the steep elevation changes of the Jordan Rift Valley, costing an estimated NIS 2 billion for the proposed 15 km route. The Israeli Ministry of Transportation has proposed allocating NIS 15 million for the extension's detailed design in the 2019 transportation budget.

Additional long-term plans exist to connect the Valley railway directly to the Eastern Railway along a route incorporating a long tunnel beneath Menashe Heights, therefore providing a full eastern rail corridor connecting northern and central Israel, supplementing the Coastal Railway as well as enabling freight trains from central Israel to reach Haifa Bay or the Jordanian border without passing through downtown Haifa.
