= Burqa, Nablus =

Burqa
- Municipality type C

Arabic transcription(s)
  - Arabic: بُرقه
  - Latin: Burqa (official)
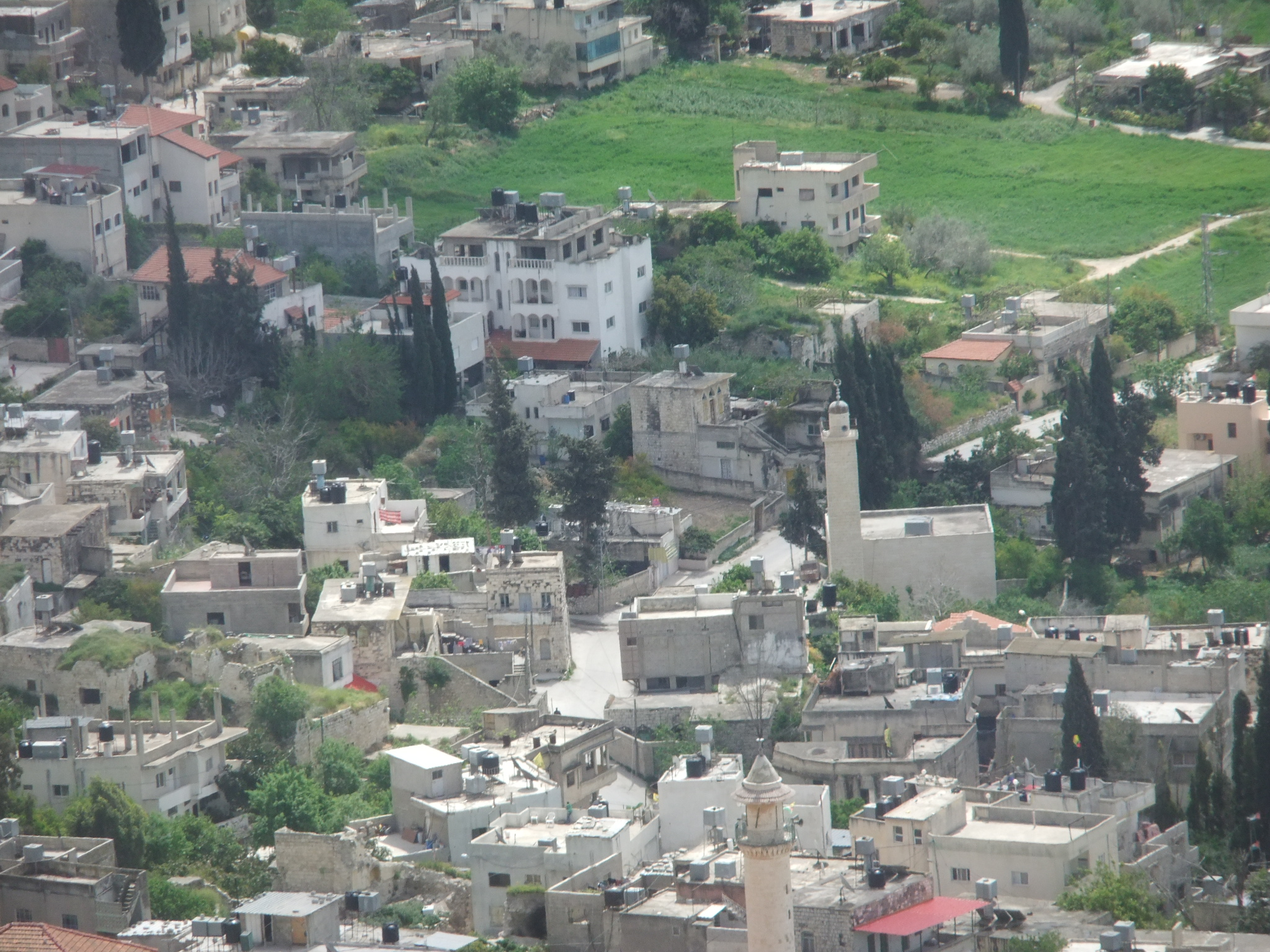
- Burqa

- Location of Burqa within Palestine
- Coordinates: 32°18′08″N 35°11′35″E
- Palestine grid: 168/189
- Country: Palestine
- Governorate: Nablus

Government
  - Type: Municipality
  - Head of Municipality: Mohammed Jamil Darbi

Population (2017)
  - Total: 4,152
- Name meaning: Sandy soil covered with dark stones, especially flints.

Burqa (Arabic: بُرقه) is a village in the Nablus Governorate in the northern West Bank, Palestine, located northwest of Nablus. According to the Palestinian Central Bureau of Statistics (PCBS), the village had a population of 4,030 inhabitants in mid-year 2006 and 4,152 by 2017.

== Location ==
Burqa is located 10.7 kilometers (6.6 mi) northwest of Nablus. It is bordered by Beit Imrin and Nisf Jubeil to the east, Jaba’, Fandaqumiya, Silat ad-Dhahr, and Al ‘Attara to the north, ‘Anabta, Bizzariya and Ramin to the west, and Deir Sharaf and Sabastiya to the south.

== History ==
Ceramics from the late Roman era have been found here, as has ceramics from the Byzantine era, and Early Muslim era.

=== Ottoman era ===
Burqa was incorporated into the Ottoman Empire in 1517 with all of Palestine, and in 1596 it appeared in the tax registers as being in the Nahiya of Jabal Sami, part of the Sanjak of Nablus. It had a population of 15 households, all Muslim. The villagers paid a fixed tax rate of 33,3% on various agricultural products, such as wheat, barley, summer crops, olives, goats or beehives, a press for olives or grapes, in addition to occasional revenues; a total of 5,132 akçe.

In 1838, Edward Robinson described Burqa as "a large village situated upon a sort of terrace on the side of the northern ridge, overlooking the whole basin of Sebustieh." He further noted that the village had a mixture of Greek Christians and Muslim inhabitants.

In 1863, Victor Guérin found the village to have one thousand inhabitants.

In 1870/1871 (1288 AH), an Ottoman census listed the village in the nahiya (sub-district) of Wadi al-Sha'ir.

In 1882, the PEF's Survey of Western Palestine described Burka as a "A large stone village on a terrace, with a good grove of olives and two springs to the west, and well to the south. The road ascends the pass through the village. There are cactus hedges round the gardens north of the village, and a large threshing-floor in the middle of the place which is built in a straggling manner along the hill-side. Some of its inhabitants are Greek Christians."

=== British Mandate era ===
In the 1922 census of Palestine conducted by the British Mandate authorities, Burqa had a population of 1,688; 1,589 Muslims and 99 Christians, where the Christians were 56 Orthodox, 41 Roman Catholics and 2 Church of England. In the 1931 census it had 448 houses and a population of 1,890; 1,785 Muslims and 105 Christians.

In the 1945 statistics, Burqa had a population of 2,590; 2,410 Muslims and 180 Christians, with 18,486 dunams of land, according to an official land and population survey. Of this, 2,451 dunams were plantations and irrigable land, 8,283 used for cereals, while 173 dunams were built-up land.

There were Christians living in the village until 1946, when they moved to Haifa.

=== Jordanian era ===
In the wake of the 1948 Arab–Israeli War, and after the 1949 Armistice Agreements, Burqa came under Jordanian rule.

The Jordanian census of 1961 found 3,352 inhabitants.

=== Post 1967 ===
Since the Six-Day War in 1967, Burqa has been under Israeli occupation. The population in the 1967 census conducted by Israel was 2,477, of whom 92 originated from the Israeli territory.

After the 1995 accords, 27% of the village land is defined as being in Area A, 29% in Area B, while the remaining 44% is defined as being Area C land. Israel confiscated 1,014 dunams of land from Burqa in order to establish the Israeli settlement of Homesh. The settlement was evacuated in 2005, but later used by the Israelis as a military base.

In 2017 construction of a women's centre funded by UN Women and Norway was done and the centre was subsequently named Dalal Mughrabi Women Community Center after a Palestinian woman who was killed in 1978 when she with 8 other militants in 1978 hijacked two buses in Israel, an incident which claimed the lives of 38 civilians, of whom many were children. As she is considered a terrorist in Norway, the Norwegian government asked for their funds to be reimbursed as Norway does not support violence.

== Bibliography ==
- Barron, J.B., ed. (1923). Palestine: Report and General Abstracts of the Census of 1922. Government of Palestine.
- Conder, C.R.; Kitchener, H.H. (1882). The Survey of Western Palestine: Memoirs of the Topography, Orography, Hydrography, and Archaeology. Vol. 2. London: Committee of the Palestine Exploration Fund.
- Dauphin, C. (1998). La Palestine byzantine, Peuplement et Populations. BAR International Series 726 (in French). Vol. III : Catalogue. Oxford: Archeopress. ISBN 0-860549-05-4.
- Ellenblum, R. (2003). Frankish Rural Settlement in the Latin Kingdom of Jerusalem. Cambridge University Press. ISBN 9780521521871.
- Government of Jordan, Department of Statistics (1964). First Census of Population and Housing. Volume I: Final Tables; General Characteristics of the Population (PDF).
- Government of Palestine, Department of Statistics (1945). Village Statistics, April, 1945.
- Guérin, V. (1875). Description Géographique Historique et Archéologique de la Palestine (in French). Vol. 2: Samarie, pt. 2. Paris: L'Imprimerie Nationale.
- Hadawi, S. (1970). Village Statistics of 1945: A Classification of Land and Area ownership in Palestine. Palestine Liberation Organization Research Center.
- Hütteroth, W.-D.; Abdulfattah, K. (1977). Historical Geography of Palestine, Transjordan and Southern Syria in the Late 16th Century. Erlanger Geographische Arbeiten, Sonderband 5. Erlangen, Germany: Vorstand der Fränkischen Geographischen Gesellschaft. ISBN 3-920405-41-2.
- Mills, E., ed. (1932). Census of Palestine 1931. Population of Villages, Towns and Administrative Areas. Jerusalem: Government of Palestine.
- Palmer, E.H. (1881). The Survey of Western Palestine: Arabic and English Name Lists Collected During the Survey by Lieutenants Conder and Kitchener, R. E. Transliterated and Explained by E.H. Palmer. Committee of the Palestine Exploration Fund.
- Robinson, E.; Smith, E. (1841). Biblical Researches in Palestine, Mount Sinai and Arabia Petraea: A Journal of Travels in the year 1838. Vol. 3. Boston: Crocker & Brewster.
- Zertal, A. (2004). The Manasseh Hill Country Survey. Vol. 1. Boston: BRILL. ISBN 9004137564.
