= Bizzariya =

- Municipality type D (Village council)

Arabic transcription(s)
  - Arabic: بزاريا
  - Latin: Bazzariya (official)
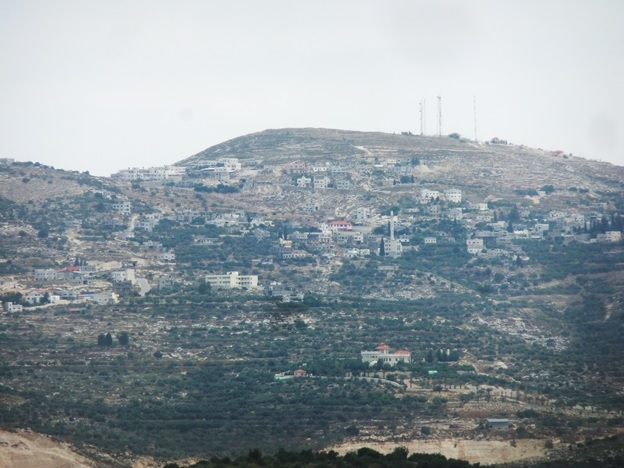
- Bizzariya

- Location of Bizzariya within Palestine
- Coordinates: 32°18′28″N 35°09′58″E
- Palestine grid: 165/190
- State: State of Palestine
- Governorate: Nablus

Government
  - Type: Village council
  - Head of Municipality: Ahmad Hamad

Population (2017)
  - Total: 2,794
- Name meaning: The well of seeds or pot-herbs

Bizzariya (Arabic: بزاريا; also spelled Bazzariya, Bazariyeh or Bizariah) is a Palestinian village in the northern West Bank, located 13.3 kilometers northwest of Nablus at the northernmost point of the Nablus Governorate. It is situated in a valley, having an altitude of 460 meters above sea level. According to the Palestinian Central Bureau of Statistics, Bizzariya had a population of over 2,252 inhabitants in 2007 and 2,794 by 2017.

== Geography ==
Bizzariya is situated on Mount 'Ilan, which has a summit of 588 meters above sea level. The village's average elevation is 450 meters above sea level. The old core of the village consists of two dunams and mostly contains half-ruined houses, with some more modern homes. The nearest localities are Ramin to the south, Burqa to the southeast, Silat ad-Dhahr to the northeast, al-Attara to the north, Kafr Rumman to the northwest and Anabta to the west.

== History ==
Pottery sherds found in Bizzariya indicate that the village was likely established during the Byzantine era in Palestine (mid-3rd to early 7th century). It was a smaller settlement than a nearby site in Bizzariya's jurisdiction called Khirbet Rujman. Most pottery sherds found Bizzariya date back to the medieval period and the village was a casale (estate) during Crusader rule in the 12th century.

=== Ottoman era ===
Bizzariya, like all of Palestine, was incorporated into the Ottoman Empire in 1517. About 10% of the pottery sherds found in the village date back to this period. In the 1596 Ottoman tax registers, Bizzariya was listed as an entirely Muslim village called "Barazia", and had a population of 26 families and two bachelors. It was located in the nahiya of Jabal Sami, part of Sanjak Nablus. The inhabitants paid a fixed tax rate of 33,3% on agricultural products, including wheat, barley, summer crops, olive trees, and goats and/or beehives, in addition to a water mill and occasional revenues, a total of 6,800 akçe.

In 1838, Edward Robinson noted Bizaria on his travels in the region, and placed it in the Wady esh-Sha'ir administrative region, west of Nablus.

In 1870 Victor Guérin noted it as a village of about one hundred inhabitants, surrounded by several gardens planted with pomegranate and fig trees. In 1882 the PEF's Survey of Western Palestine described Bizzaria as a "small hamlet on high ground, with springs to the east."

In 1870/1871 (1288 AH), an Ottoman census listed the village in the nahiya (sub-district) of Wadi al-Sha'ir.

=== British Mandate era ===
In the 1922 census of Palestine, conducted by the British Mandate authorities, Bezarieh had a population of 183 Muslims, increasing in the 1931 census to 217, still all Muslim, in 42 houses.

In the 1945 statistics the population was 320, all Muslims, with 4,278 dunams of land, according to an official land and population survey. Of this, 357 dunams were plantations and irrigable land, 1,393 were used for cereals, while 52 dunams were built-up land.

=== Jordanian era ===
In the wake of the 1948 Arab–Israeli War, and after the 1949 Armistice Agreements, Bizzariya came under Jordanian rule.

The Jordanian census of 1961 found 530 inhabitants.

=== Post-1967 ===
Since the Six-Day War in 1967, Bizzariya has been under Israeli occupation.

After the 1995 accords, 91% of the village land is defined as Area A, while the remaining 9% is defined as Area B.

== Demographics ==
In 1997, Bizzariya had a population of 1,606. Palestinian refugees and their descendants accounted for 7.3% of the population. The village's principal families are Hussein, Salim, Hammad, Naser and 'Odah.

== Bibliography ==
- Barron, J.B., ed. (1923). Palestine: Report and General Abstracts of the Census of 1922. Government of Palestine.
- Conder, C.R.; Kitchener, H.H. (1882). The Survey of Western Palestine: Memoirs of the Topography, Orography, Hydrography, and Archaeology. Vol. 2. London: Committee of the Palestine Exploration Fund.
- Government of Jordan, Department of Statistics (1964). First Census of Population and Housing. Volume I: Final Tables; General Characteristics of the Population (PDF).
- Government of Palestine, Department of Statistics (1945). Village Statistics, April, 1945.
- Guérin, V. (1875). Description Géographique Historique et Archéologique de la Palestine (in French). Vol. 2: Samarie, pt. 2. Paris: L'Imprimerie Nationale.
- Hadawi, S. (1970). Village Statistics of 1945: A Classification of Land and Area ownership in Palestine. Palestine Liberation Organization Research Center.
- Hütteroth, W.-D.; Abdulfattah, K. (1977). Historical Geography of Palestine, Transjordan and Southern Syria in the Late 16th Century. Erlanger Geographische Arbeiten, Sonderband 5. Erlangen, Germany: Vorstand der Fränkischen Geographischen Gesellschaft. ISBN 3-920405-41-2.
- Mills, E., ed. (1932). Census of Palestine 1931. Population of Villages, Towns and Administrative Areas. Jerusalem: Government of Palestine.
- Palmer, E.H. (1881). The Survey of Western Palestine: Arabic and English Name Lists Collected During the Survey by Lieutenants Conder and Kitchener, R. E. Transliterated and Explained by E.H. Palmer. Committee of the Palestine Exploration Fund.
- Robinson, E.; Smith, E. (1841). Biblical Researches in Palestine, Mount Sinai and Arabia Petraea: A Journal of Travels in the year 1838. Vol. 3. Boston: Crocker & Brewster.
- Zertal, A. (2004). The Manasseh Hill Country Survey. Vol. 1. Boston: BRILL. ISBN 9004137564.
