= Silat ad-Dhahr =

Palestinian town near Jenin, West Bank

- Municipality type C

Arabic transcription(s)
  - Arabic: سيلة الظهر
  - Latin: Silat adh Dhahr (official)
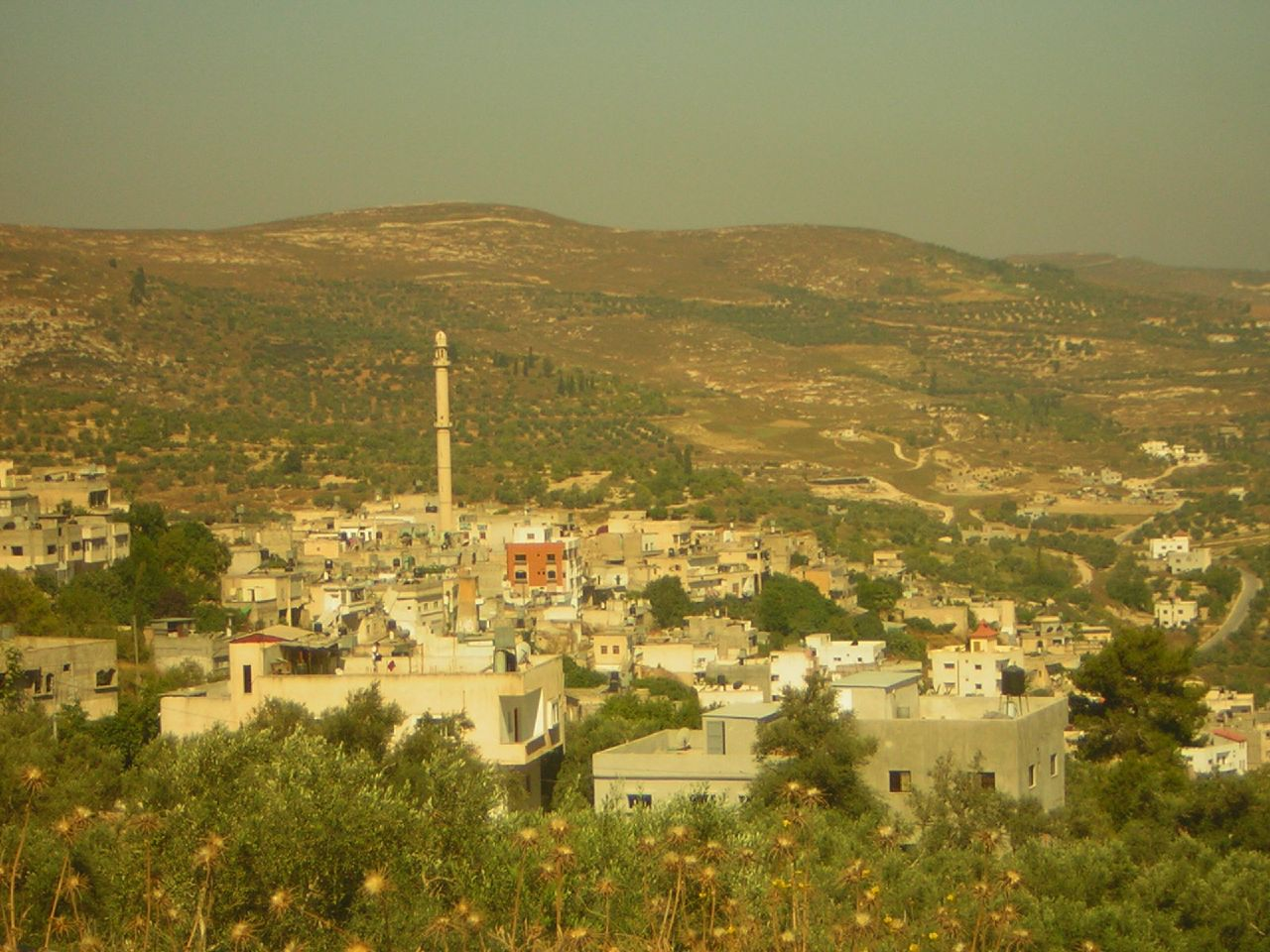
- View of Silat ad-Dhahr

- Location of Silat ad-Dhahr within Palestine
- Coordinates: 32°19′10″N 35°11′04″E
- Palestine grid: 167/191
- State: State of Palestine
- Governorate: Jenin

Government
  - Type: Municipality
  - Head of Municipality: Amin Abdullah Abu Qayas

Population (2017)
  - Total: 7,406
- Name meaning: Sileh of the ridge

Silat ad-Dhahr (Arabic: سيلة الظهر) is a Palestinian town in the Jenin Governorate of Palestine, in the northern West Bank, located 22 kilometers (14 mi) southwest of Jenin. According to the Palestinian Central Bureau of Statistics (PCBS) census, the town had a population of 5,794 in 2007 and 7,406 by 2017. The healthcare facilities for the surrounding villages are based in Silat adh Dhahr, the facilities are designated as MOH level 2.

The average elevation of the town is 400 meters (1,300 ft) above sea level. The population in 1997 was 4,439, according to the Palestinian Central Bureau of Statistics, the estimated population in 2001 was approximately 6,000 and was divided into 51% males and 49% female, young people representing a very high percentage of inhabitants. About 30% of inhabitants are traders and 20% rely on agriculture, producing such products as olives and almonds.

The village has a high level of education, and there is a large group of university graduates. There are water and electricity networks in the town, there are also telephone and Internet lines. There is also a health clinic and sports, social and cultural centers and libraries. There are five schools in the town: the Industrial School (co-ed, 150 students), a secondary school for boys (450 students), primary school for boys (500 students), a secondary school for girls (400 students), and a primary school for girls (650 students).

== Geography ==
Silat ad-Dhahr is situated in a deep ravine at the edge of a ridge with an average elevation of 370 meters (1,210 ft) above sea level. It is surrounded by the hills of the Musheirif Range. The old core of the village is situated on a spur and has an area of 28 dunams. The village is located 23 kilometers (14 mi) southwest of Jenin in the northern West Bank. The nearest localities are Fandaqumiya and Jaba' to the east, Burqa to the south, Bizzariya to the southwest, al-Attara to the west, Rama to the northwest, Ajjah to the north and Anzah to the northeast.

== History ==
In 1949, a burial cave from the Roman and Byzantine periods was excavated in Silat ad-Dhahr by the American School of Oriental Research and McCormick Theological Seminary. The cave, located at the village's western edge, had three chambers, each with ten kokhim, and contained a variety of findings. It is thought that the oil lamps discovered at the site are of Samaritan origin. Ben-Zvi wrote that the local Thaher family is of Samaritan ancestry.

A site on the ridge above Silat ad-Dhahr and with the same name contains Byzantine-era pottery sherds, mosaic fragments and a wine press.

Pottery sherds from the town of Silat ad-Dhahr itself indicate that it was founded during the early Islamic period (9th–10th centuries CE). Arab chroniclers called it Silat ad-Dhahr to distinguish it from another homonymous Silat (Silet) northwest of Jenin.

Rehov Inscription identification

Aaron Demsky identified Silat ad-Dhahr with Shilta (Hebrew: שילתא), mentioned in the Mosaic of Rehob from the 6th-7th centuries as a village in the region of Sebastia. The agricultural produce of Shilta was exempt from the normal Jewish restrictions imposed during the Sabbatical years, or the need for tithing, possibly because it was inhabited by Samaritans or Gentiles or both. It is mentioned next to Penṭāḳūmewatha, identified with the nearby village of Fandaqumiya.

Ze'ev Safrai also associated Silat adh-Dhahar with Shilta, attributing the identification to Zussman. He wrote that the village was only known as Sila during the 17th century, indicating that the suffix "adh-Dhahar" was added later. The name Sila is mentioned as a Samaritan center in a Samaritan chronicle. According to Safrai, the Samaritan community later became a Gentile community.

In the absence of any suitable finds, Zertal suggested Shilta should be located at the nearby site of Neby Lawin, whereas, he believes, the name survived in the later founded Silet adh-Dhahr.

=== Medieval period ===
The Crusaders conquered the area in 1099 and referred to the village as "Sileta". King Baldwin IV of the Kingdom of Jerusalem confirmed the sale in 1178 of the village made by the viscount of Nablus (vicecomes Neapolitanus) to the Knights Hospitaller. The transaction included 103 "Bedouin tents", meaning homes, indicating that the tribal lands of the latter were in the vicinity of Silat ad-Dhahr. The total price paid was 5,500 bezants, of which 2,000 were for the village itself.

The village was mentioned by geographer Yaqut al-Hamawi in his Mu'jam al-Buldan, written in the early 13th century, during Ayyubid rule.

=== Ottoman era ===
Silat ad-Dhahr was incorporated into the Ottoman Empire with the rest of Palestine in 1517. In the 1596 Ottoman tax records, it appeared under the name of Sila, located in the Nahiya Jabal Sami, in the Nablus Sanjak. It had a population of 27 households and 9 bachelors, all Muslim. The villagers paid a fixed tax-rate of 33.3% on agricultural products, including wheat, barley, summer crops, olive trees, goats and beehives, in addition to occasional revenues and a press for olives or grapes; a total of 7,400 akçe. Nearby Neby Lawin at the same time had 21 families and 6 bachelors, also all Muslims.

Silat ad-Dhahr was mentioned by the Turkish traveler Evliya Celebi in 1640. In the spring of 1697, Henry Maundrell, on his way to Jerusalem, noted there "a fair Fountain, called Selee, taking its name from an adjacent village." Most of the buildings in Silat ad-Dhahr's old town date back to the 17th and 18th centuries.

The village's main mosque was built in the 19th century. It has a particularly tall minaret. Robinson missed it in his travels in the region in 1838, but notes that Henry Maundrell had passed it during his travels. Robinson placed it in the esh-Sha'rawiyeh esh-Shurkiyeh, the eastern administrative region, north of Nablus.

In 1870 Victor Guérin visited, and described it as “a large village divided into quarters, with 1800 inhabitants. It occupies a hill surrounded by higher hills in the north, with beautiful olive trees on their slopes. A good fountain supply the village.”

In 1870/1871 (1288 AH), an Ottoman census listed the village in the nahiya (sub-district) of al-Sha'rawiyya al-Sharqiyya.

In 1882, the PEF's Survey of Western Palestine described Silat ad-Dhahr as:

"a good-sized and flourishing village, built on a hill slope, with many good stone houses. It is surrounded by fine groves of olives, and owns good lands in the plain. The principal water supply is from a good spring of clear water, which appears to be perennial. This comes out of the chalk rock on the slope of the hill by the main road above the village on the north-cast. It is called 'Ain Sileh, and is half-a-mile from the houses. The name of the sacred place opposite the village on the north is of special interest : Neby Lawin, signifying the Levite Prophet."

During the end of this era, under the leadership of the German engineer Heinrich August Meißner (Meisner Pasha), 156 kilometers (97 mi) of railway were built between Silat ad-Dhahr and Beersheba, during just a six-month period.

=== British Mandate period ===
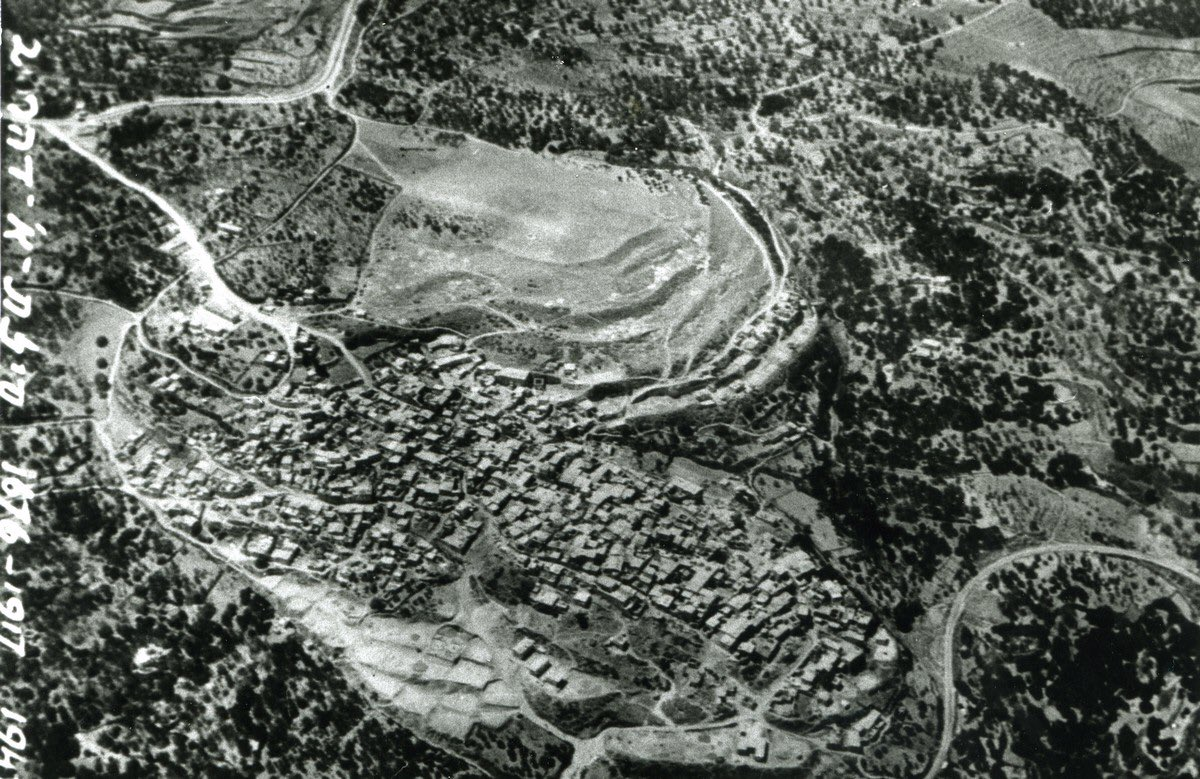
Silat ad-Dhahr 1947 from Palmach archive

Palestine, including Silat ad-Dhahr, was captured by British forces during World War I and the country subsequently came under a British Mandate. In the 1922 census of Palestine, conducted by the British Mandate authorities, Silat ad-Dhahr had a population of 1,638, mostly Muslims with three Christians, all Orthodox. The population increased in the 1931 census to 1,985 inhabitants, all Muslims, living in 466 houses.

Silat ad-Dhahr was home to Abu Khalid, a disciple of Izz ad-Din al-Qassam and rebel commander during the 1936–1939 Palestine revolt against the British authorities.

In 1945 statistics, the population of Silat eh Dahr was 2,850, all Muslims, with 9,972 dunams of land, according to an official land and population survey. 1,978 dunams were used for plantations and irrigable land, 4,577 dunams for cereals, while 64 dunams were built-up (urban) land and 3,179 dunams were classified as "non-cultivable".

=== Jordanian era ===
In the wake of the 1948 Arab–Israeli War, and after the 1949 Armistice Agreements, Silat ad-Dahr came under Jordanian rule.

In 1961, the population of Silat Dhahr was 3,566 persons.

=== 1967, aftermath ===
Silat ad-Dhahr has been under Israeli occupation since the 1967 Six-Day War. Under the Oslo Accords, the town was assigned to Area B.

=== IDF and Israeli settler violence ===
Israeli military took over several houses in the town in 2004. In 2005, 18 people from Silat ad-Dhahr were killed by Al-Qaeda terrorists in the Amman bombings.

In 2008, Israeli settlers harassed villagers and closed off the main road.

== Demographics ==
Silat ad-Dhahr had a population of 4,639 in the 1997 census by the Palestinian Central Bureau of Statistics (PCBS). Palestinian refugees and their descendants accounted for 11.7% of the inhabitants. In the 2007 PCBS census, Silat ad-Dhahr's population grew to 5,794. The number of households was 946, with each household containing an average of between six members. Women made up 49.3% of the population and men 50.7%.

== Neby Lawin ==
Just north of Silat ad-Dhahr is Neby Lawin, known in Crusader sources as Loie or Loja, while considered the burial place of Levi in the late 19th century.

The Reḥov mosaic inscription from the Byzantine period lists Laviya (לבייה) among the Jewish settlements of the Sebaste district, whose inhabitants were exempt from agricultural laws governing produce because of the territory’s ambiguous status.

== Bibliography ==
- Barron, J.B., ed. (1923). Palestine: Report and General Abstracts of the Census of 1922. Government of Palestine.
- Clermont-Ganneau, C.S. (1888). Recueil d'archéologie orientale (in French). Vol. 1. Paris: Ernest Leroux.
- Conder, C.R. (1890). "Norman Palestine". Quarterly Statement - Palestine Exploration Fund. 22: 29–37. doi:10.1179/peq.1890.22.1.29.
- Conder, C.R.; Kitchener, H.H. (1882). The Survey of Western Palestine: Memoirs of the Topography, Orography, Hydrography, and Archaeology. Vol. 2. London: Committee of the Palestine Exploration Fund.
- Ellenblum, R. (2003). Frankish Rural Settlement in the Latin Kingdom of Jerusalem. Cambridge University Press. ISBN 9780521521871.
- Government of Jordan, Department of Statistics (1964). First Census of Population and Housing. Volume I: Final Tables; General Characteristics of the Population (PDF).
- Government of Palestine, Department of Statistics (1945). Village Statistics, April, 1945.
- Guérin, V. (1875). Description Géographique Historique et Archéologique de la Palestine (in French). Vol. 2: Samarie, pt. 2. Paris: L'Imprimerie Nationale.
- Hadawi, S. (1970). Village Statistics of 1945: A Classification of Land and Area ownership in Palestine. Palestine Liberation Organization Research Center.
- Hütteroth, W.-D.; Abdulfattah, K. (1977). Historical Geography of Palestine, Transjordan and Southern Syria in the Late 16th Century. Erlanger Geographische Arbeiten, Sonderband 5. Erlangen, Germany: Vorstand der Fränkischen Geographischen Gesellschaft. ISBN 3-920405-41-2.
- Maundrell, H. (1703). A Journey from Aleppo to Jerusalem: At Easter, A.D. 1697. Oxford: Printed at the Theatre.
- Mills, E., ed. (1932). Census of Palestine 1931. Population of Villages, Towns and Administrative Areas. Jerusalem: Government of Palestine.
- Palmer, E.H. (1881). The Survey of Western Palestine: Arabic and English Name Lists Collected During the Survey by Lieutenants Conder and Kitchener, R. E. Transliterated and Explained by E.H. Palmer. Committee of the Palestine Exploration Fund.
- Robinson, E.; Smith, E. (1841). Biblical Researches in Palestine, Mount Sinai and Arabia Petraea: A Journal of Travels in the year 1838. Vol. 3. Boston: Crocker & Brewster.
- Röhricht, R. (1890). Geographica Palaestinae: Chronologisches Verzeichniss der auf die Geographie des Heiligen Landes] ["Chronological directory of the geography of the Holy Land")] (in German). Berlin: H. Reuther.
- Swedenburg, Ted (2003). Memories of Revolt: The 1936–1939 Rebellion and the Palestinian National Past. University of Arkansas Press. ISBN 1610752635.
- Zertal, A. (2004). The Manasseh Hill Country Survey. Vol. 1. Boston: Brill. ISBN 9004137564.
