= Heinrich August Meissner =

German civil engineer

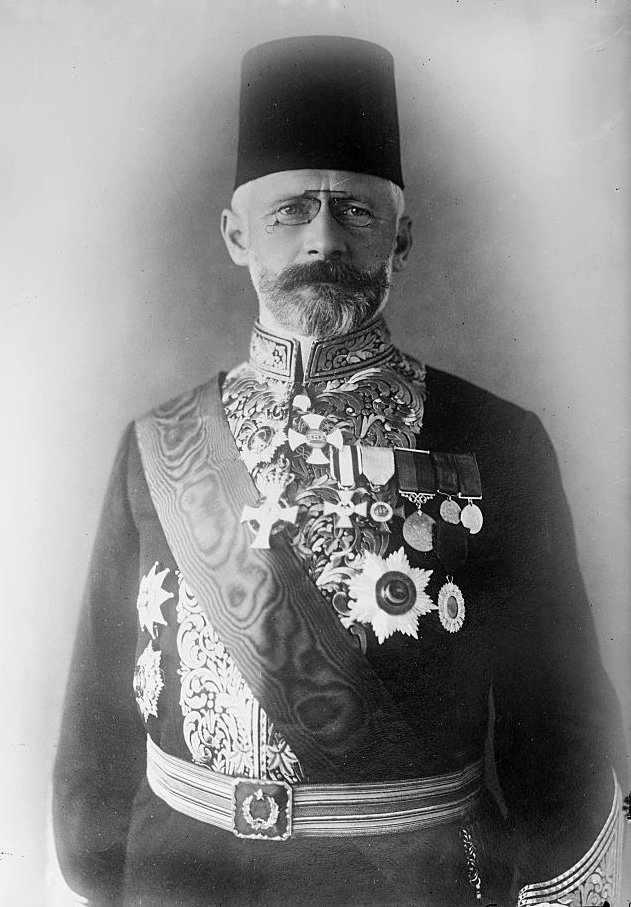
- Heinrich August Meissner
- Born: January 3, 1862; Leipzig, Kingdom of Saxony
- Died: January 14, 1940 (aged 78); Istanbul, Turkey
- Other name: Meissner Pasha
- Education: Dresden University of Technology
- Occupations: Civil engineer, railway planner, university lecturer
- Known for: Hejaz Railway, Baghdad Railway, Ottoman military railways

Heinrich August Meissner (German: Heinrich August Meißner, January 3, 1862 – January 14, 1940) was a German engineer who was largely responsible for the railway network in the Ottoman Empire, and later helped manage the network in Turkey. He attained the high-ranking honorary title of pasha in the empire.

== Personal life ==
Meissner was born in Leipzig in 1862. He studied at the Dresden University of Technology. Interested in the public works being planned in Turkey, he studied the Turkish language, and at the age of 24 moved to the Ottoman Empire. Meissner died in 1940 in Istanbul.

== Railway work ==
=== Early works ===
Starting in 1886, Meissner served in a number of important posts related to civil engineering in the Ottoman Empire. He worked on railways in southern Bulgaria, Macedonia, Antalya and Thrace.

=== Hejaz and Baghdad railways ===
Meissner was invited to manage the construction of the Hejaz Railway, the largest public works undertaking in the empire. In the eight years from 1900 to 1908, he was able to build the main section, from Damascus to Medina, including the Jezreel Valley railway. In 1904 he received the title of pasha from the Sultan for his work on the railway, stretching only from Damascus to Ma'an at the time. After the Young Turk Revolution of 1908, the Hejaz Railway project was abandoned, and Meissner moved on to the Baghdad Railway project, funded by the German Empire.

In 1910 Meissner was chosen to manage the Aleppo section of the railway, and later moved on to Mesopotamia (modern-day Iraq) for the Baghdad section.

=== World War I ===
In World War I, Meissner served under Djemal Pasha, who was his personal friend from their time in Mesopotamia. He helped build the Ottoman military railway system in Palestine in the war. After the war he went back to Germany.

=== After the war ===
In 1924 Meissner was invited by Mustafa Kemal Atatürk to continue his railway work. He oversaw the reconstruction and maintenance of many railway lines in Turkey and later taught at the Istanbul Technical University.

== See also ==
Ottoman Palestine railways

- Eastern Railway, Ottoman WWI line, Tulkarm to Hadera and Tulkarm to Lydda; connected to Jezreel Valley, Jaffa–Jerusalem, and Beersheba lines
- Railway to Beersheba or the 'Egyptian Branch', Ottoman WWI line headed towards the Suez Canal; two lines: (Lidda–) Wadi Surar–Beit Hanoun, and Wadi Surar–Beersheba

Mandate Palestine & Israel railways

- Palestine Railways, government-owned company and rail monopolist in Mandate Palestine (1920-1948)
- Rail transport in Israel
  - Israel Railways, the state-owned principal railway company in Israel
  - Coastal railway line, Israel, main line in Mandate Palestine and Israel

Syria and Jordan

- Chemin de Fer de Hedjaz Syrie (CFH), successor to the Hedjaz Railway in Syria
- Hedjaz Jordan Railway (HJR), successor to the Hedjaz Railway in Jordan
