= Al-Attara =

al-Attara
- Municipality type D (Village council)

Arabic transcription(s)
  - Arabic: العطارة
  - Latin: al-Attara (official) al-’Attara (unofficial)
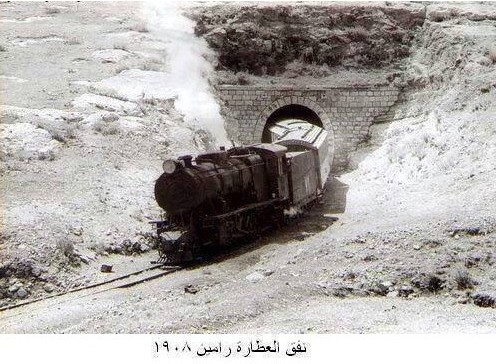
- Railway passing just south of Al-Attara in 1908

- Location of al-Attara within Palestine
- Coordinates: 32°19′35″N 35°09′42″E
- Palestine grid: 168/192
- State: Palestine
- Governorate: Jenin

Government
  - Type: Village council

Population (2017)
  - Total: 1,244
- Name meaning: 'Attara, personal name, compare Hebrew: עטרות

Al-Attara (Arabic: العطارة) is a Palestinian village in the Jenin Governorate of Palestine, in the northwestern area of the West Bank, located 15 kilometers southwest of Jenin. According to the Palestinian Central Bureau of Statistics, the village had a population of 1,072 inhabitants in mid-year 2006 and 1,244 by 2017.

== History ==
Pottery sherds from the late Roman, Byzantine and early Islamic periods have been found here.

According to SWP: "This place is mentioned in the Onomasticon (s. v. Atharoth) as a city of Ephraim, north of Sebaste, and 4 miles from it. The distance is exact."

In Crusader sources it was called Lathara.

In 1140, Ussama, a Moslem traveller, mentioned Al-Attara together with nearby Silat ad-Dhahr.

In 1178, it was attacked by Bedouin, but withstood the attack.

=== Ottoman era ===
Al-Attara, like all of Palestine, was incorporated into the Ottoman Empire in 1517. About 10% of the pottery sherds found in the village date back to this period. In the 1596 Ottoman tax registers, Al-Attara was listed as an entirely Muslim village called 'Attara, and had a population of 12 families and 2 bachelors. It was located in the nahiya of Jabal Sami in the liwa of Nablus. The inhabitants paid a fixed tax rate of 33,3% on agricultural products, including wheat, barley, summer crops, olive trees, and goats and/or beehives, in addition to occasional revenues and a tax on people from the Nablus area, a total of 5,000 akçe.

A fortress, dating from the 16th—17th century, is visible in the centre of the village.

In 1870, Victor Guérin noted it as a poor village, but one which had succeeded an ancient place.

In 1870/1871 (1288 AH), an Ottoman census listed the village in the nahiya (sub-district) of al-Sha'rawiyya al-Gharbiyya.

In 1882, the PEF's Survey of Western Palestine (SWP) described Al-Attara as "A small stone village on a spur of mountain, with a few olives and a well on the west."

=== British Mandate era ===
In the 1922 census of Palestine conducted by the British Mandate authorities, Al-Attara had a population of 164 Muslims, increasing in the 1931 census to 193 Muslims, in 51 houses.

In the 1945 statistics, the population of Al-Attara was 250 Muslims, with 3,844 dunams of land according to an official land and population survey. Of this, 88 dunams were plantations and irrigable land, 1,784 were used for cereals, while 5 dunams were built-up (urban) land.

=== Jordanian era ===
After the 1948 Arab–Israeli War and the 1949 Armistice Agreements, Al-Attara came under Jordanian rule.

The Jordanian census of 1961 found 388 inhabitants in Al-Attara.

=== Post-1967 ===
Since the Six-Day War in 1967, Al-Attara has been under Israeli occupation. Under the Oslo Accords, most of this town was assigned to Area A, with political control and security assigned to the Palestinian National Authority.

== Bibliography ==
- Barron, J.B., ed. (1923). Palestine: Report and General Abstracts of the Census of 1922. Government of Palestine.
- Conder, C.R.; Kitchener, H.H. (1882). The Survey of Western Palestine: Memoirs of the Topography, Orography, Hydrography, and Archaeology. Vol. 2. London: Committee of the Palestine Exploration Fund.
- Government of Jordan, Department of Statistics (1964). First Census of Population and Housing. Volume I: Final Tables; General Characteristics of the Population (PDF).
- Government of Palestine, Department of Statistics (1945). Village Statistics, April, 1945.
- Guérin, V. (1875). Description Géographique Historique et Archéologique de la Palestine (in French). Vol. 2: Samarie, pt. 2. Paris: L'Imprimerie Nationale.
- Hadawi, S. (1970). Village Statistics of 1945: A Classification of Land and Area ownership in Palestine. Palestine Liberation Organization Research Center. Archived from the original on 2018-12-08.
- Hütteroth, W.-D.; Abdulfattah, K. (1977). Historical Geography of Palestine, Transjordan and Southern Syria in the Late 16th Century. Erlanger Geographische Arbeiten, Sonderband 5. Erlangen, Germany: Vorstand der Fränkischen Geographischen Gesellschaft. ISBN 3-920405-41-2.
- Mills, E., ed. (1932). Census of Palestine 1931. Population of Villages, Towns and Administrative Areas. Jerusalem: Government of Palestine.
- Palmer, E.H. (1881). The Survey of Western Palestine: Arabic and English Name Lists Collected During the Survey by Lieutenants Conder and Kitchener, R. E. Transliterated and Explained by E.H. Palmer. Committee of the Palestine Exploration Fund.
- Zertal, A. (2004). The Manasseh Hill Country Survey. Vol. 1. Boston: BRILL. ISBN 9004137564.
