= Ramin, Tulkarm =

Ramin
- Place

Arabic transcription(s)
  - Latin: Rameen (official)
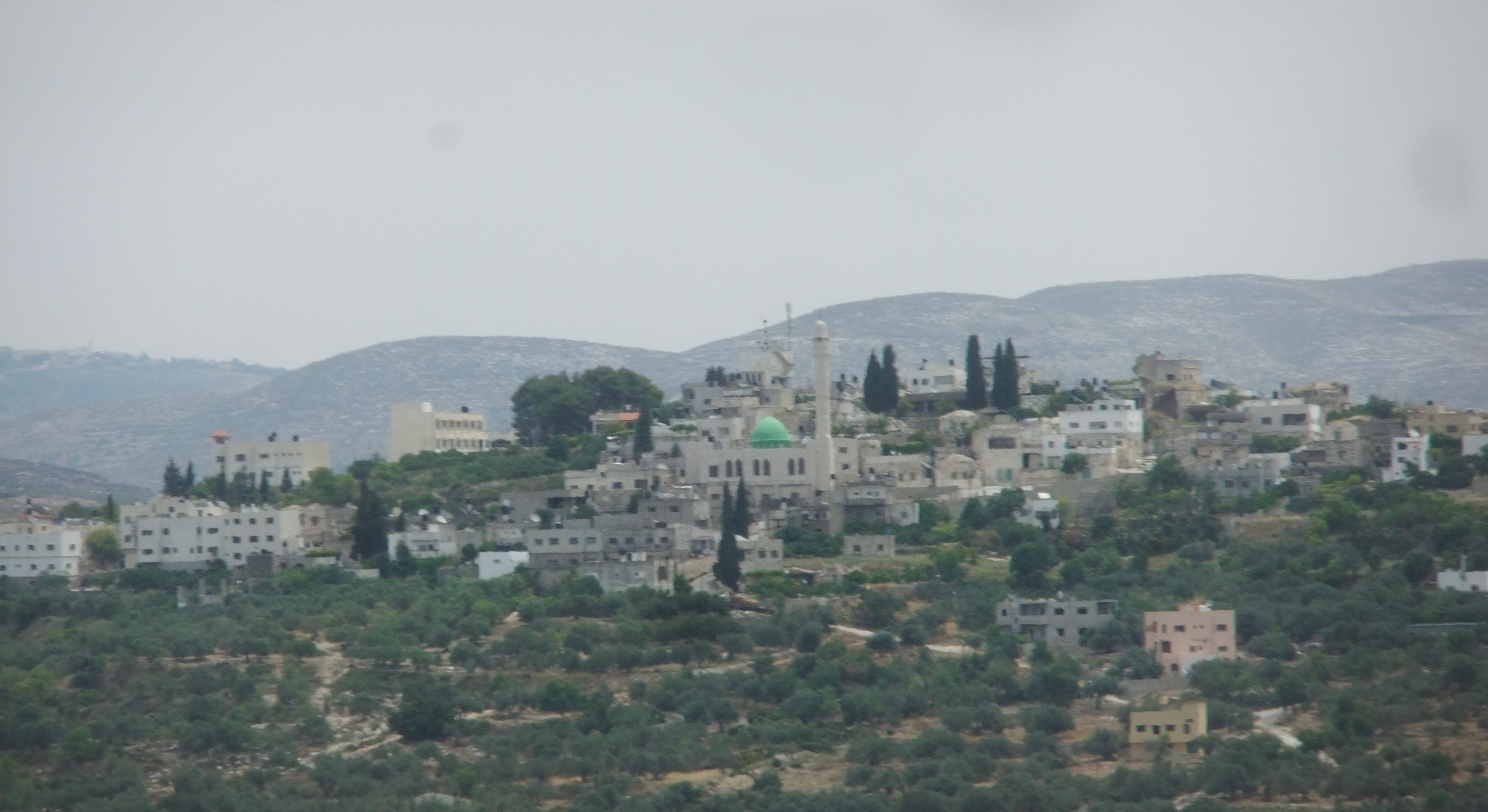
- Ramin from the west

- Location of Ramin within Palestine
- Coordinates: 32°17′03″N 35°08′57″E
- Palestine grid: 164/187
- State: State of Palestine
- Governorate: Tulkarm

Area
  - Total: 8.5 km^{2} (3.3 sq mi)

Population (2017)
  - Total: 1,998
  - Density: 240/km^{2} (610/sq mi)
- Name meaning: "high place" or, from personal name

Ramin (Arabic: رامين) is a Palestinian village in the northeastern West Bank, located 15 kilometers east of Tulkarm in the Tulkarm Governorate of the State of Palestine. According to the Palestinian Central Bureau of Statistics, the village had a population of approximately 1,998 in 2017.

== History ==
Ceramics from the early and late Roman, Byzantine early Moslem, and Medieval eras have been found here.

During the early Crusader era, Daniel the Traveller reported that he saw a church here, identified by local Christians as the burial place of Joseph of Arimathea. Ḍiyāʼ al-Dīn (1173-1245) reported that there were Muslims living in Ramin during his lifetime.

=== Ottoman era ===
Ramin, like all of Palestine was incorporated into the Ottoman Empire in 1517. In the 1596 tax registers, it was part of the nahiya ("subdistrict") of Jabal Sami, part of the larger Sanjak of Nablus. It had a population of 9 households, all Muslims. The inhabitants paid a fixed tax rate of 33.3% on agricultural products, including wheat, barley, summer crops, olive trees, goats and beehives, in addition to occasional revenues; a total of 4,930 akçe.

In 1838, Edward Robinson noted it on his travels in the region, and placed it in the Wady esh-Sha'ir administrative region, west of Nablus. In 1870, Victor Guérin described it as a village situated on a high hill with 700 inhabitants. He further noted that the small square in front of the madafeh (guest house) was paved with large slabs of an ancient appearance.

In 1882, the PEF's Survey of Western Palestine (SWP) described Ramin as "a village of moderate size, on a hill, with a second knoll to the east, whence its name. It has a few olives beneath it."

=== British Mandate era ===
In the 1922 census of Palestine conducted by the British Mandate authorities, Ramin had a population of 320 Muslims, increasing in the 1931 census to 423 Muslims, living in 113 houses.

In the 1945 statistics the population of Ramin was 630 Muslims, who owned 8,868 dunams of land according to an official land and population survey. Of this, 745 dunams were plantations and irrigable land, 2,575 were used for cereals, while 14 dunams were built-up (urban) land.

=== Jordanian era ===
In the wake of the 1948 Arab–Israeli War, and after the 1949 Armistice Agreements, Ramin came under Jordanian rule.

In 1961, the population of Ramin was 864.

=== Post 1967 ===
Since the Six-Day War in 1967, Ramin has been under Israeli occupation, and according to the Israeli census of that year, the population of Ramin stood at 818, of whom 8 were registered as being refugees from Israel.

Ramin's population is made up of the families of Salman (30%), Zafer (24%), Hamad (22%) and Zeiden (24%).

Ramin's total land area is about 8,500 dunams, of which 422 dunums is built-up area, about 500 dunams for quarries and 500 dunams for pastures. 470 dunams have been confiscated for the Israeli settlement of Enav, and for other Israeli causes (such as bypass roads, military positions). Ramin's remaining land is covered by olive and almond orchards.

== Bibliography ==
- Barron, J.B., ed. (1923). Palestine: Report and General Abstracts of the Census of 1922. Government of Palestine.
- Conder, C.R.; Kitchener, H.H. (1882). The Survey of Western Palestine: Memoirs of the Topography, Orography, Hydrography, and Archaeology. Vol. 2. London: Committee of the Palestine Exploration Fund.
- Dauphin, C. (1998). La Palestine byzantine, Peuplement et Populations. BAR International Series 726 (in French). Vol. III : Catalogue. Oxford: Archeopress. ISBN 0-860549-05-4.
- Ellenblum, R. (2003). Frankish Rural Settlement in the Latin Kingdom of Jerusalem. Cambridge University Press. ISBN 9780521521871.
- Government of Jordan, Department of Statistics (1964). First Census of Population and Housing. Volume I: Final Tables; General Characteristics of the Population (PDF).
- Government of Palestine, Department of Statistics (1945). Village Statistics, April, 1945.
- Guérin, V. (1875). Description Géographique Historique et Archéologique de la Palestine (in French). Vol. 2: Samarie, pt. 2. Paris: L'Imprimerie Nationale.
- Hadawi, S. (1970). Village Statistics of 1945: A Classification of Land and Area ownership in Palestine. Palestine Liberation Organization Research Center.
- Hütteroth, W.-D.; Abdulfattah, K. (1977). Historical Geography of Palestine, Transjordan and Southern Syria in the Late 16th Century. Erlanger Geographische Arbeiten, Sonderband 5. Erlangen, Germany: Vorstand der Fränkischen Geographischen Gesellschaft. ISBN 3-920405-41-2.
- Mills, E., ed. (1932). Census of Palestine 1931. Population of Villages, Towns and Administrative Areas. Jerusalem: Government of Palestine.
- Palmer, E.H. (1881). The Survey of Western Palestine: Arabic and English Name Lists Collected During the Survey by Lieutenants Conder and Kitchener, R. E. Transliterated and Explained by E.H. Palmer. Committee of the Palestine Exploration Fund.
- Pringle, D. (1998). The Churches of the Crusader Kingdom of Jerusalem: L-Z (excluding Tyre). Cambridge University Press. ISBN 0521390370.
- Robinson, E.; Smith, E. (1841). Biblical Researches in Palestine, Mount Sinai and Arabia Petraea: A Journal of Travels in the year 1838. Vol. 3. Boston: Crocker & Brewster.
- Zertal, A. (2004). The Manasseh Hill Country Survey. Vol. 1. Boston: BRILL. ISBN 9004137564.
