= Yanun =

- Municipality type D (Village council)

Arabic transcription(s)
  - Arabic: يانون
  - Latin: Yanoun (official)
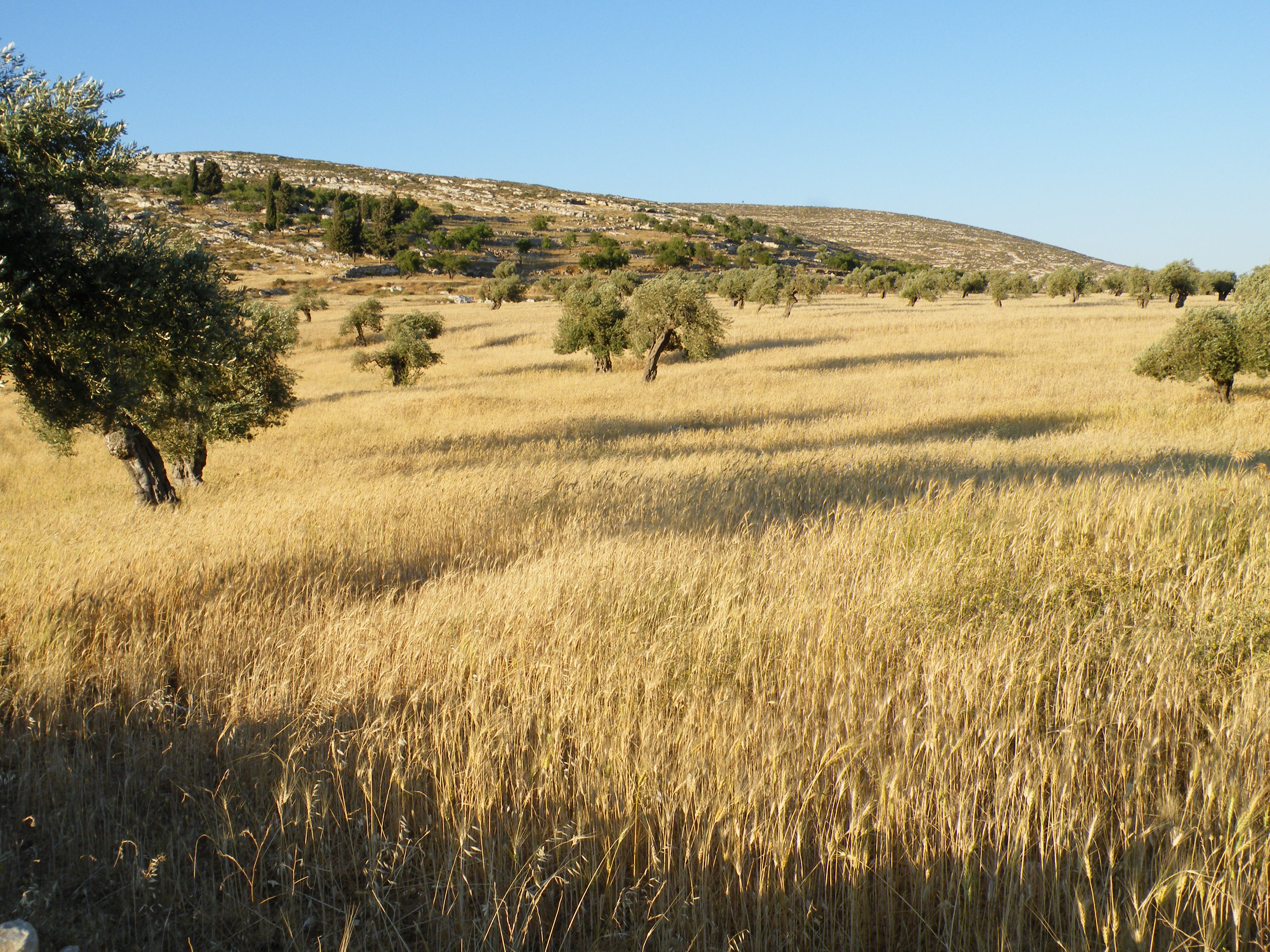
- The golden fields of Yanoun in May

- Location of Yanun within Palestine
- Coordinates: 32°08′44″N 35°21′20″E
- Palestine grid: 183/172
- State: State of Palestine
- Governorate: Nablus

Government
  - Type: Village council
  - Head of Municipality: Abd al-Latif Bani Jaber

Area
  - Total: 16.0 km^{2} (6.2 sq mi)

Population (2017)
  - Total: 92
  - Density: 5.8/km^{2} (15/sq mi)
- Name meaning: from personal name

Yanun (Arabic: يانون, romanized: Yânûn) is a Palestinian village in the Nablus Governorate of the State of Palestine, in the northern West Bank, located 12 kilometers (7.5 mi) southeast of Nablus, and 3 miles north of Aqraba. It lies within Area C, under total Israeli control, of the West Bank. It is divided into two sites, upper and lower Yanun. Upper or northern Yanin is considered illegal by the Israeli authorities, and development is prohibited there.

After being destroyed post-16th century, the village was reestablished in 1878 by Muslim Bosniak families who received lands from the Ottoman government. One Bosniak family still owns the land, although it's now inhabited by their tenants, who also live in the nearby hamlet of Ein Yanun. The inhabitants have their origins in the nearby villages of Awarta and Beit Furik.

According to the Palestinian Central Bureau of Statistics (PCBS), the village had a population of 92 in 2017. This was a decrease from 2004 when the PCBS recorded that Yanun had 145 inhabitants. The residents of the village have to travel to Beit Furik for primary health care.

== History ==
Pottery sherds from Iron Age II, Roman, Byzantine, and Crusader/Ayyubid eras have been found here.

Yanun the village is distinct from Khirbet Yanun, nearby ruins to the north-east of the village. According to Edward Robinson, Yanun corresponds to the Janō(Ἰανὼ) of Eusebius and Jerome, a village in Acrabatene east of Neapolis, which, according to Robinson, these two Church Fathers confused with the ancient frontier town of Yanoḥah(ינוחה) of Naphtali, which belonged to the Tribe of Ephraim. Victor Guérin argued that both Eusebius and Jerome had confused the Yanoḥah of the tribe of Ephraim with the quite distinct, homophonous village belonging to the tribe of Naphtali (p. 7) Modern researchers, following Guerin, have suggested that the Biblical Yanoḥah refers to Khirbet Yanun, as pottery sherds from lron Age I has been found there, and not at Yanun. Several caves dot the area, which the local school headmaster claims were dwelt in by the Canaanites.

There is a shrine, formerly used by villagers as a mosque, believed to be of the prophet Nun on a hillock called Nabinun three hundred metres east of Lower Yanun.

Byzantine pottery and other signs of ancient habitation including tombs carved into rock have been found at the village site. There are ruins of a Frankish church.

=== Ottoman era ===
In 1596, Yanun appeared in Ottoman tax registers as a village in the Nahiya of Jabal Qubal, part of Sanjak Nablus, with a population of 18 Muslim households. The villagers paid a fixed tax rate of 33,3% on various agricultural products, including wheat, barley, summer crops, olives, goats or beehives, and a press for olives or grapes; a total of 7,500 akçe.

Edward Robinson visited Yanun in 1852. He wrote that the village was mostly in ruins and only a few houses were inhabited. In the 19th century, Yanun was settled by some 50 Bushnaks (Bosniaks), Muslims from Bosnia, after their country was ceded to the Austro-Hungarian Empire by the Congress of Berlin. The sultan Abdul Hamid gave the immigrants a significant part of the village. According to Haaretz, these were soldiers sent to reinforce Ottoman rule in Palestine. Adopting a common surname, Bushnak, they later moved to nearby Nablus and leased their farmlands to villagers from Aqraba who gradually left their village to settle in Yanun themselves. The villagers are their partners and descendants. In 1870, Victor Guérin visited, and noted the Neby Nun east of Yanun. In the 1882, the Survey of Western Palestine described it as "A small village on the edge of a deep valley, with a sacred place to the east (Neby Nun), and a small spring about 1 mile to the north".

=== British Mandate era ===
In the 1922 census of Palestine conducted by the British Mandate authorities, Yanun had a population of 70; all Muslim, increasing in the 1931 census to 120, still all Muslims, in a total of 22 houses.

According to the 1945 statistics, Yanun had a population of 50 Muslims, with a total of 16,439 dunams of land, living in a built-up area of 34 dunams. Of this, 731 dunams were plantations and irrigable land, while 3,969 dunams were used for cereals.

=== Jordanian era ===
In the wake of the 1948 Arab–Israeli War, and after the 1949 Armistice Agreements, Yanun came under Jordanian rule. It was annexed by Jordan in 1950.

The Jordanian census of 1961 found 103 inhabitants.

=== 1967 and aftermath ===
After the Six-Day War in 1967, Yanun has been under Israeli occupation.

After the 1995 accords, 31% of the land of Aqraba/Yanun was classified as Area B, the remaining 69% as Area C.

As of 2002, the village is still leased by the residents of Aqraba and payment for leasing the land could be made in the form of wheat, olive oil or cash. About three-quarters of Yanun's 16,000 dunams of land is still leased.

According to Vikram Sura, Itamar settlers used to trade with local farmers and visit Yanun to enjoy refreshments like cardamom-spiced coffee and mint tea there. In the mid-late 1990s, Itamar began 'annexing' hills stretching out from the settlement towards Yanun. Trailer homes from Itamar began to be set up along the ridge overlooking the village. The last outpost, Giv'ot Olam, looking down over the village of Yanun, was created by Avri Ran, who obtained the land by trespassing on Yanun-owned areas and on Israeli state land, and assaulting any Palestinians who approached his settlement. Though they felt surrounded, the Yanun villagers did not feel vulnerable. Relations changed with the outbreak of the Al-Aqsa Intifada in October 2000, when 13 Israeli Arabs were shot dead during the suppression of a riot protesting the visit of Ariel Sharon to the Temple Mount. Yanun lies far from the main areas where Palestinian militants and the IDF subsequently clashed, and till then grievances between the two communities were less than the norm. Over the next three years, Palestinian militants killed roughly 11 Itamar settlers. A Californian who made aliyah to Itamar later accused Yanun of having aided these terrorists. No member of the village has been linked to any attack on settlers. The youths on Avri Ran's hilltop outpost argue that they have a prerogative to respond with violence when they feel their Palestinian neighbours are preventing them from realizing their right, as legal heirs of God's bequest, to work the land.

Armed settlers, according to local reports began to hinder Yanun farmers from harvesting their olive crops, intimidating the villagers and damaging the village's electrical generator. According to a survey reported and compiled by Yanun councilor Abdelatif Sobih, Yanun villagers have since been subjected to repeated assaults on their homes and farms; beatings; shootings, some resulting in death; poisoning and shootings of their flocks; the use of fierce dogs to impede farmer access to their lands; blocking of their access roads; pollution of their water resource; destruction of their electric generator, constructed with a donation from the Economic Development Group; the ploughing of fields sown with crops, or the burning of crops at harvest time; theft of olive trees; shooting at relatives' cars travelling to visit Yanun; and interrogation of teachers at the Yanun elementary school.

==== 2002 temporary exodus ====
Assaults and shootings by settlers at Palestinian farmers and foreign volunteers at olive harvest time took place in 2002. A Council spokesman for the Israeli settlement of Itamar, in response to queries about the incidents, replied that he was unaware of claims of harassment and that settlers were trying to keep Palestinian villagers away from themselves. Another Itamar spokesman told The Guardian at the time “If anyone is being terrorized it is us. Arabs have to learn that if they continue to be violent they can’t live here. There is all this talk of Arab olives, what about Jewish blood?”

The village was temporarily abandoned on October 19, 2002, the first exodus in recent times of a Palestinian community abandoning a village in the wake of attacks by settlers. The last of 25 families relocated to nearby Aqraba after a reported worsening in their harassment by Itamar residents, including Avri Ran and his organization, the Hilltop Youth. Two aged people stayed behind, refusing to accept the village decision to go. The village was re-occupied with the aid of peace activists from Ta'ayush and the International Solidarity Movement, who came and held a round-the-clock presence there for two weeks when the villagers started moving out in response to harassment. The presence of foreign volunteers as witnesses has acted as a brake on settler assaults. Ta'ayush activist David Nir was reportedly pushed by Avri Ran in Yanun. Amiel Vardi, professor of classics at Hebrew University, was also shot there by a settler whom he subsequently identified and took to court. The case was dismissed. Since 2003, EAPPI has maintained a round-the-clock protective presence in Yanoun, reporting on human rights violations.

On October 30, 2002, together with David Shulman, a group that included the distinguished Israeli writers Amos Oz, Meir Shalev, A. B. Yehoshua, David Grossman, the daughter of Haim Gouri, with Rabbi Menachem Froman, co-founder of Gush Emunim and a settler in Tekoa, Ian Buruma and an assortment of Israeli television camera crews and journalists visited Yanun to assist the returned villagers with their harvest and ward off settlers. According to Shulman, one of the settler rabbis had declared that Jews had the right to steal olives from the Palestinians, since the land belonged to the former. Rabbi Froman, armed with a heavy pile of books, including the Gemara and Shulchan Aruch, turned up to show that these texts actually forbid stealing olives from non-Jews.

== Incidents ==
Early in 2012, the IDF began reviewing plans to revive a dormant firing range, 904A, in the area, and began forbidding Palestinians from using the area, though the ban does not apply to settlers of the Giva 777 outpost of Itamar. Over the summer, Rahed Fahmi, the head of the Yanun council, together with Rabbis for Human Rights and an Israeli-Palestinian association Lohamin Leshalom (Fighting for Peace) have been involved in an intense campaign to convince Israeli authorities of the right of Yanun and Aqraba villagers to their lands. They succeeded in obtaining a right to visit their fields for one week, from July 3 to July 10, by which time the wheatcrop had mostly withered. On Saturday July 7, two military jeeps accompanied the farmers to their fields. According to local farmers, sheep were being beaten by settlers. According to the EAPPI and Amira Hass, dozens of Jewish settlers attacked Yanun, one of 50 settler assaults in the West Bank in that month, assailed villagers and killed three sheep, with four villagers, members of the Bani Jaber family, badly injured and requiring hospital treatment. In the assault one was beaten and later handcuffed by soldiers who intervened. A fifth, Jawdat Ibrahim, was reportedly beaten, wounded, bound and left in a field, where he was found the following day. According to an IDF source, the Israeli army intervened in a stone-throwing fray between settlers and villagers, and used tear-gas to stop the clash. According to an official of the Nablus Governorate, one of the victims, Jawdat Bani Jabir, was shot in the face and the foot by soldiers and subsequently stabbed by settlers. Five head of cattle were also slaughtered. According to the EAPPI, "The attack began mid-afternoon, when three Palestinian farmers working in their fields were set upon by settlers armed with machine guns and knives. The settlers stabbed three of the farmers’ sheep to death. When EAs arrived at the scene at the request of the head of the village, there were also fires burning in two wheat fields and an olive grove. Israeli soldiers fired tear gas at Palestinians who were trying to reach the area to put out the fires." The day after, another 10 sheep of the flock died. The entire area reserved for their agriculture is now denied to them, but the fields are now tended by settlers permitted to live in the new firing range.

EAPPI reported that Rashed Murrar, head of the village, fears that the intention of the attack was to cause the Palestinian villages to give up their wheat fields. The village, which is home to just 65 people, is surrounded by Israeli outposts, which are considered illegal both under international law and Israeli law.

The villagers reportedly managed to deter settlers who undertook an attack on the village during the olive harvest in October 2015.

In December 2025, the last 5 fsamullues [sic?] in the upper part of the village were forced to leave following a series of attacks and harassment from settlers. The settlers' actions included blocking access to herding areas, destruction of sown fields by plowing, taking over abandoned houses and harassment of students and teachers.

== Critical judgements ==
The civilian population of Yanun, along with that of Bil'in, Jinba and several other places, in the judgement of scholar and Ta'ayush peace activist David Shulman, has been subject to practices that are "singularly cruel". Amira Hass, writing for Haaretz, argues that the systematic attacks on Palestinian villagers like those at Yanun, who are Semites, constitute a form of antisemitism, with the difference that such assaults in the West Bank are rarely if ever reported. The recent history of the village has been cited for the theory that after the Oslo Accords, Israel is applying a policy of slow transfer of Palestinians from villages near Israeli settlements on the West Bank. The Spanish scholar, Ferran Izquierdo Brichs, cites what has happened there as an example of ethnic cleansing.

== Environment ==
Yanun has been described as an "idyllic village", if one ignores its recent troubles. Driving in from Aqraba, there are views of hillocks full of olive groves meet the eye, while to the right the land falls steeply down into the Jordan Valley. It is surrounded by lush valleys, adorned in spring with anemones and cyclamens, that boast of olive groves and sheep pastures, with views down the valley towards Aqraba. The village itself holds the ruins of fortified Ottoman houses and a dilapidated castle. The site known as Nabinun, on the hillock of that name, has been identified as a former synagogue-mosque and is associated with the biblical father of Joshua.

== Photos ==
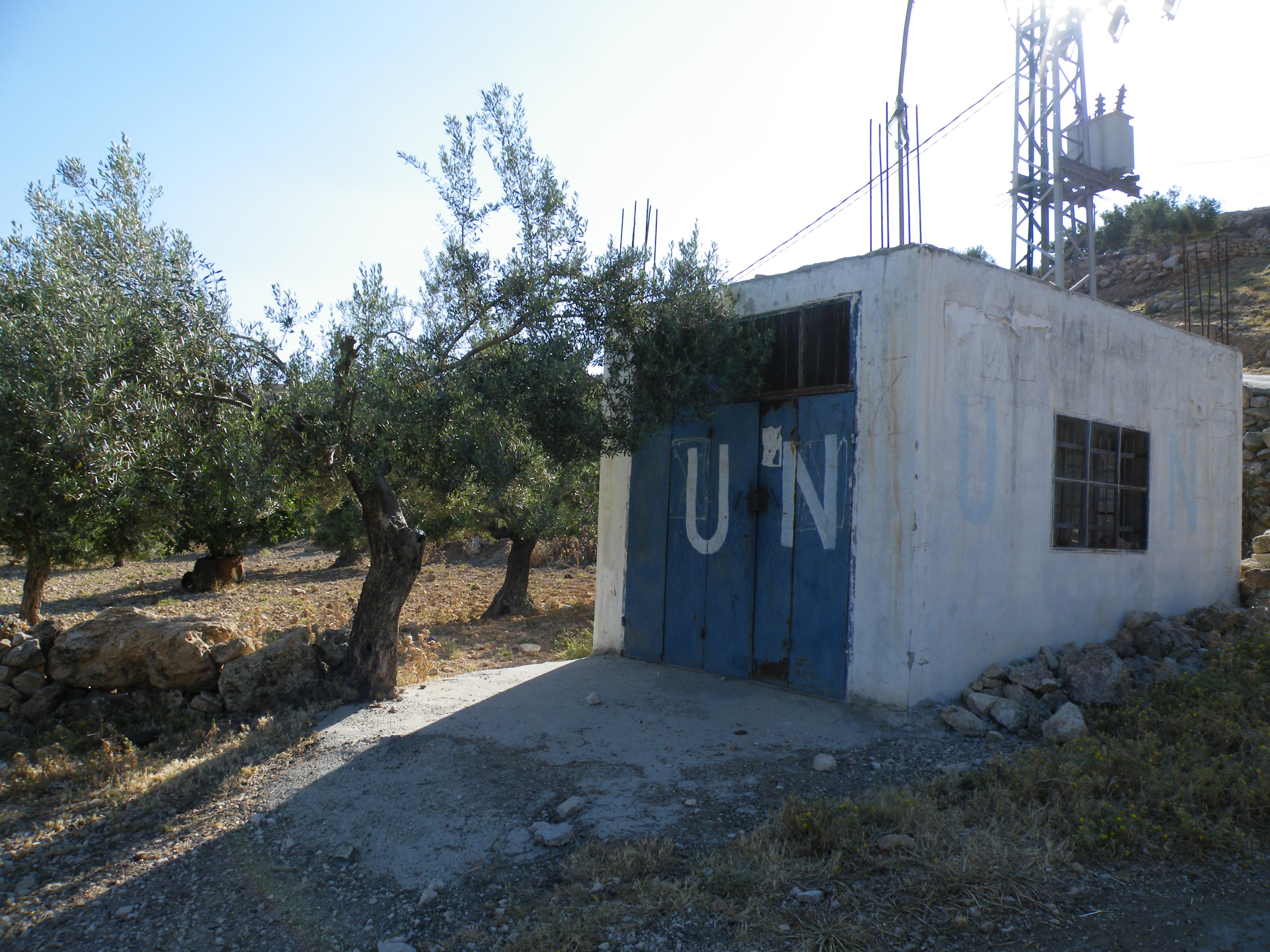
The UN emergency generator in the village of Yanoun

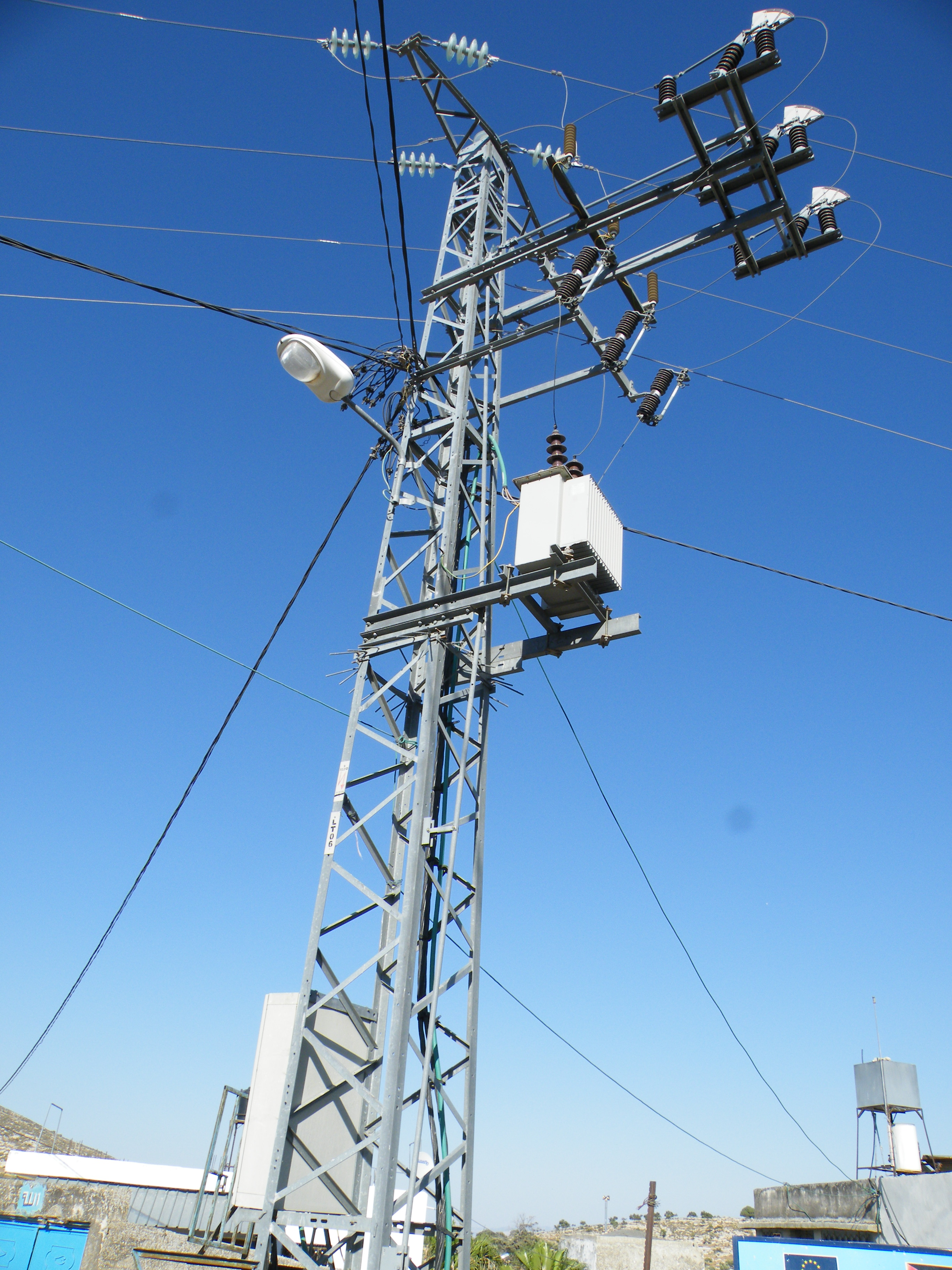
One of the new power lines installed and paid for by the Kingdom of Belgium's Rural Electrification Project: Northern Area West Bank

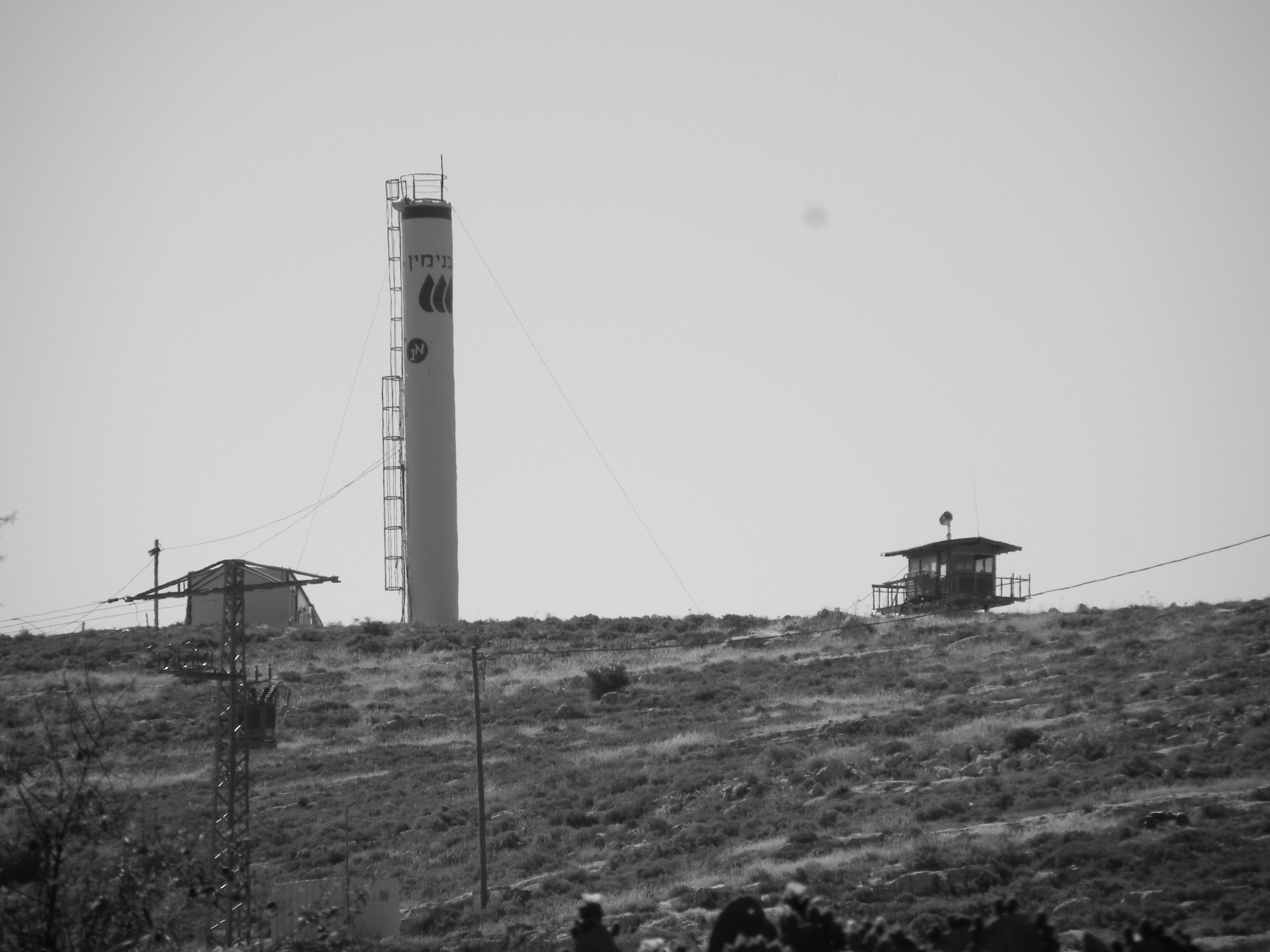
Water tower and watchtower near Yanoun

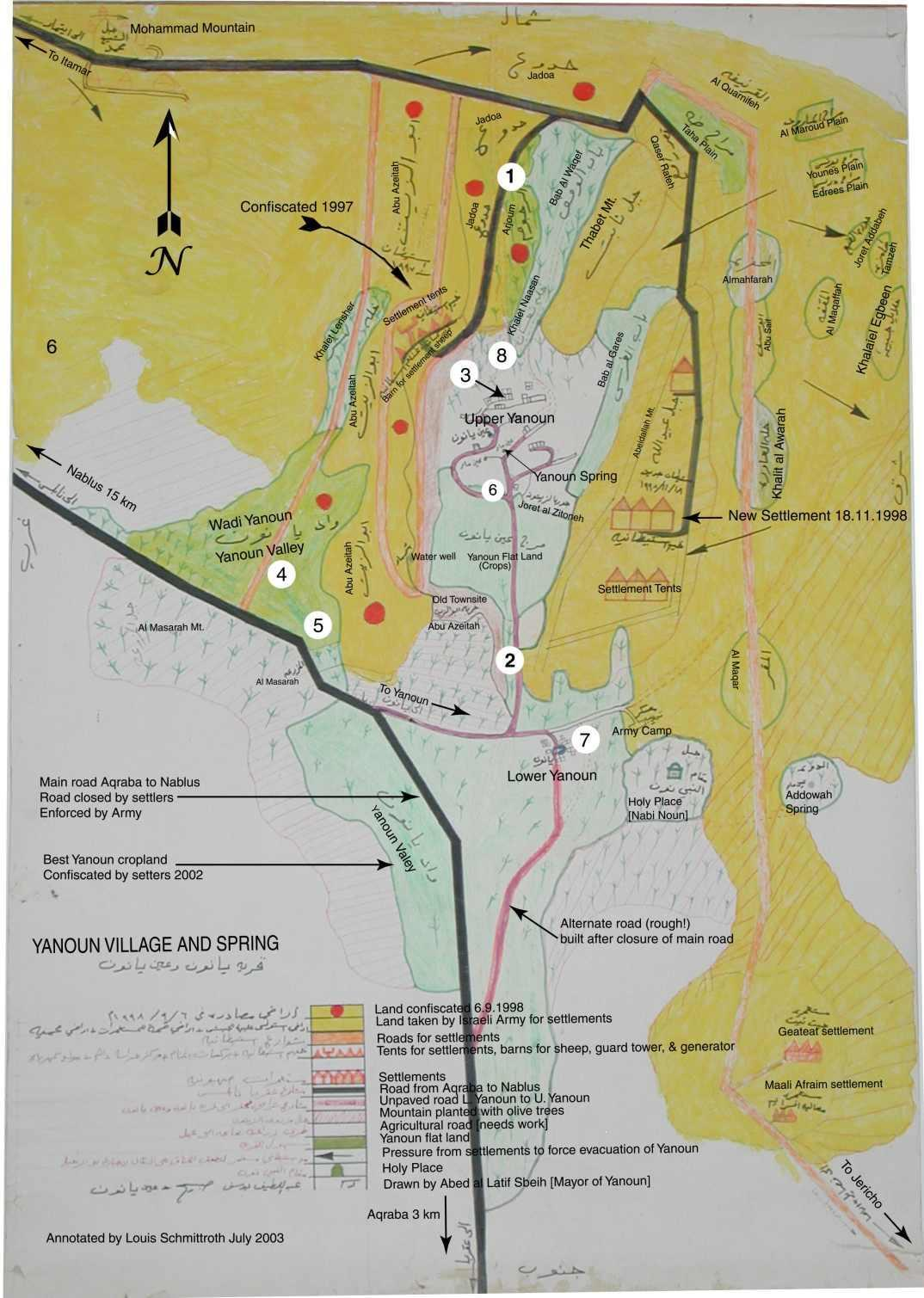
Locations of the attacks that have occurred in Yanoun

== Bibliography ==
- Baltzer, A. (2007). Witness in Palestine: A Jewish American Woman in the Occupied Territories. Paradigm Publishers.
- Barron, J.B., ed. (1923). Palestine: Report and General Abstracts of the Census of 1922. Government of Palestine.
- Beinin, J.; Stein, Rebecca L, eds. (2006). The Struggle for Sovereignty: Palestine And Israel, 1993–2005 (Stanford Studies in Middle Eastern and Islamic Societies and Cultures). Stanford Univ Pr. ISBN 0-8047-5364-4.
- Brichs, Ferran Izquierdo (2005). "El cor de la neteja ètnica: Relat d'un viatge a Cisjordània i la Franja de Gaza". In Belén Vicéns (ed.). L'Orient Mitjà en el punt de mira. Universitat Autònoma de Barcelona. pp. 125–137. ISBN 978-8-449-02391-0.
- Canaan, T. (1927). Mohammedan Saints and Sanctuaries in Palestine. London: Luzac & Co. Archived from the original on 2019-05-16.
- Conder, C.R.; Kitchener, H.H. (1882). The Survey of Western Palestine: Memoirs of the Topography, Orography, Hydrography, and Archaeology. Vol. 2. London: Committee of the Palestine Exploration Fund.
- Dauphin, C. (1998). La Palestine byzantine, Peuplement et Populations. BAR International Series 726 (in French). Vol. III : Catalogue. Oxford: Archeopress. ISBN 0-860549-05-4.
- Ellenblum, R. (2003). Frankish Rural Settlement in the Latin Kingdom of Jerusalem. Cambridge University Press. ISBN 9780521521871.
- Finkelstein, I.; Lederman, Zvi, eds. (1997). Highlands of many cultures. Tel Aviv: Institute of Archaeology of Tel Aviv University Publications Section. ISBN 965-440-007-3.
- Government of Jordan, Department of Statistics (1964). First Census of Population and Housing. Volume I: Final Tables; General Characteristics of the Population (PDF).
- Government of Palestine, Department of Statistics (1945). Village Statistics, April, 1945.
- Guérin, V. (1875). Description Géographique Historique et Archéologique de la Palestine (in French). Vol. 2: Samarie, pt. 2. Paris: L'Imprimerie Nationale.
- Hadawi, S. (1970). Village Statistics of 1945: A Classification of Land and Area ownership in Palestine. Palestine Liberation Organization Research Center.
- Hütteroth, W.-D.; Abdulfattah, K. (1977). Historical Geography of Palestine, Transjordan and Southern Syria in the Late 16th Century. Erlanger Geographische Arbeiten, Sonderband 5. Erlangen, Germany: Vorstand der Fränkischen Geographischen Gesellschaft. ISBN 3-920405-41-2.
- Irving, Sarah (2012). Palestine. Bradt Travel Guides. ISBN 9781841623672.
- Mandal, Thomas (2011). Living With Settlers: Interviews with Yanun villagers (PDF). World Council of Churches. Archived from the original (PDF) on 2011-06-01.
- McMahon, Sean (2010). The Discourse of Palestinian-Israeli Relations: Persistent Analytics and Practices. Routledge. ISBN 978-0-415-99548-1.
- Mills, E., ed. (1932). Census of Palestine 1931. Population of Villages, Towns and Administrative Areas. Jerusalem: Government of Palestine.
- Palmer, E.H. (1881). The Survey of Western Palestine: Arabic and English Name Lists Collected During the Survey by Lieutenants Conder and Kitchener, R. E. Transliterated and Explained by E.H. Palmer. Committee of the Palestine Exploration Fund.
- Pedahzur, Ami; Perliger, Arie (2009). Jewish Terrorism in Israel. Columbia University Press. ISBN 978-0231520751.
- Pringle, D. (1997). Secular buildings in the Crusader Kingdom of Jerusalem: an archaeological Gazetter. Cambridge University Press. ISBN 0521-46010-7.
- Reinhart, T. (2006). The Road Map to Nowhere: Israel/Palestine Since 2003. London; New York: Verso. ISBN 1-84467-076-7.
- Robinson, E.; Smith, E. (1856). Later Biblical Researches in Palestine and adjacent regions: A Journal of Travels in the year 1852. London: John Murray.
- Saunders, Trelawney William (1881). An Introduction to the Survey of Western Palestine: Its Waterways, Plains & Highlands. R. Bentley and Son.
- Khalili, Hussein (2004). "Yanoun". In Josie Sandercock (ed.). Peace under fire: Israel/Palestine and the International Solidarity Movement. Verso. pp. 180–181. ISBN 978-1-844-67007-9.
- Shulman, D.D. (2007). Dark Hope. University of Chicago Press. ISBN 9780226755809.
- Settlers Force Desertion of Yanun Village, Settlement Report. Vol. 12. Foundation for Middle East Peace. November–December 2002.
- Yizhar, S. (2008). Khirbet Khizeh: A Novel. Translated: Nicholas Robert, Michael De Lange, Yaacob Dweck. Granta Publications. ISBN 978-1847084248.
