= Avri Ran =

Israeli settler activist (born 1955)

Avraham "Avri" Ran (Hebrew: אברי רן; born 1955) is an Israeli settler activist and businessman, with a record for repeated criminal offenses against Palestinians. He has been called the founding father and "undisputed symbol" of the Hilltop Youth movement. (Note: "These activists made a name for themselves among the Israeli public primarily through the violence and militancy they often demonstrate toward their Palestinian neighbours and the antipathy they exhibit toward any sign of sovereign authority of the State of Israel. Many of them have explicitly declared that the State of Israel has come to the end of its days, and a new theocratic state composed of workers of the land should be established and run according to Jewish religious law." (Pedahzur & Perliger 2009, p. 114)) (Note: Daniel Byman regards the descriptor as a misnomer since most participants in the movement are over 25 and are married.(Pedahzur 2012, p. 136)) His approach to developing Palestinian lands has been described as "environmental racism", combining working the terra while applying terror.

An organic food entrepreneur, he is also a reserve lieutenant/colonel in the IDF. He has been indicted several times, and convicted on four counts, three of assault and one case of aggravated assault. Considered in right-wing Israeli religious circles to be a "messianic hero", by some sources as a "charismatic guru", or one of the "biblical sabra", his presence in the area of the Palestinian village of Yanun has spelled "disaster" for the latter's inhabitants.

== Life ==
Ran was born in 1955 in Nir Hen, in the Negev. He was raised in a secular family in the Israeli coastal settlement of Nahsholim until his late teens, when his family, mother and brother (who later joined the Israeli security service, the Shin Beit) left the kibbutz. Inducted into the IDF, where he became a commander in an armoured division. In 1995, Ran also served in an elite operations unit, the Sayeret Matkal. He worked in a shoe factory in Tel Aviv, and became strictly orthodox, together with his wife Sharona, who came from the moshav Neve Yarak. The couple has ten children. Кюзы

Shortly after the signing of the Oslo Accords, in September 1993, Ran moved with his wife from moshav Meir, where he says he owned a farm, to the Israeli West Bank settlement of Itamar, near the Palestinian town of Nablus, an area he was familiar with from his reserve duties in the armoured corps. There he built and ran an organic chicken coop. With the confirmation of the Wye River Memorandum, on 15 November 1998 Ariel Sharon declared to a crowd of militants

"Everybody has to move, run and grab as many hilltops as they can to enlarge the settlements because everything we take now will stay ours..Everything we don't grab will go to them."

That December (Note: Lavie states that it was on the eve of the Wye River talks, which took place in October. (Lavie 2003)) Ran made his own move, (Note: "Ran was responding to a meeting between Prime Minister Binyamin Netanyahu and US President Bill Clinton to negotiate further Israeli withdrawals from what the Israelis who live here call Judea and Samaria." (Friedman 2012)) venturing beyond Itamar's fencing to pitch a tent on an open, windswept hill some six kilometers east of Itamar, naming the Israeli outpost Giv'ot Olam (Hills of Eternity/the Universe.) He reached it by stages, starting at "The Spot", shifting then to Hill 851, until he gained the summit. (Note: 'Gv’aot Olam / Avri Ran Ranch (established in December 1998); Hill 777 (January 1999); and Hill 782 (May 1999).) Over time, Ran dispossessed Palestinian families of over 900 dunams of personal property to establish his business.

According to the Israeli political scientist Hagar Kotef, his Giv'ot Olam farmland was founded by means of "land-grabbing, intimidation, harassment, and physical violence". Ran is said to believe that brutality is integral to living in nature. Though many settlers running organic farms consider the traditional Palestinian methods of cultivation (handpicking olives and ploughing fields by harnassing donkeys) as primitive, it has been argued that their fair trade cooperatives have been certificated to sell high-quality organic products on the international market.

Despite drawing on heavy government subsidies, (Note: 'Despite( t)his rhetoric, his organic enterprise was heavily subsidized by various state apparatuses. . . The state has actively supported the project of expansion by providing infrastructure such as roads, electricity, military protection and overlooking the settlers’ violent attacks on Palestinians and recurrent legal violations.') Ran considers himself both a self-made man exemplifying "Jewish genius", and a Mapainik, as having followed the Mapai approach of taking land, of being indifferent to what others say, asking no questions, and developing it, something he says he learnt on his kibbutz. Many of those he recruits are high school dropouts and, of the 50 youths working on his farm, behaviourial problems are common.

Ran, who has faced bankruptcy problems, obtained a loan from the World Zionist Organization, and from Bank Leumi, using a chicken coop as collateral, and by mortgaging what he called Havat Itamar (Itamar Farm).

Ran himself lives on his self-styled "Avri Ran Ranch" a mile from the mother outpost of Giv'ot Olam.

== Conflict with the villagers of Yanun ==
Palestinians are, in Ran's view "an invasive species". He claims he has no enmity, as opposed to indifference to a people he regards as "Arab dust". According to Haaretz, Ran seized the land by trespassing on what Israel claims to be its state property, and by sequestering lands belonging to the adjacent Palestinian village of Yanun. Thereafter, he attacked any Palestinian who ventured to enter what he declared to be his own land. In 2012, Peace Now director Dror Ektes stated that any Yanun villager who ventured more than 50 yards from his home risked being attacked by Giv'ot Olam people. Those who work under Ran at the outpost claim that all of the land is God's bequest to the Jewish people and that they as legal heirs exercised a prerogative to employ violence against local Palestinians who contest their reclamation of the territory; modern legal arguments about Palestinian property rights are an irrelevance.

According to village documentation, 21 major settler attacks on the residents and their property took place from 1997 to 2004, with most of the damage caused by people from Ran's outpost at Giv'ot Olam. These incidents consisted of acts of assault, shootings, beatings, harm to livestock, including the poisoning of sheep and an episode of arson, which destroyed the only available infrastructure for electricity, an installation that had been donated to Yanun by the United Nations. In 1998, 128 goats had been slaughtered and thousands of olive trees cut down.

In October 2002, harassment, theft, and attacks by a band of youths led by Ran was so severe that the entire village decided they had no option but to evacuate. According to Abdelatif Sobeih, the mayor at that time, who still bears scars from his encounter, Ran told him: "Yanoun belongs to me," and that "You must ask my permission before you do anything." "I am the army here; I am the police; I am the whole world."

Ran regards the presence of settlers as part of a war, stating: "Make no mistake about it – we are winning this battle, and we have no one to apologize to for that." He oversees the defense of the outpost, taking care of its perceived security needs, saying that they do not rely on the Israeli army, preferring not to "drain" the country's resources. Some critics respond that this, in effect, has made life for Palestinians in the vicinity a "living hell". He is known to some as "the Sheriff". As of 2020, according to Kotef, the continual severity of attacks and harassment from Ran's outpost has led Yanun villagers to almost completely abandon their lands.

== Brushes with the law ==
According to testimony given to Anna Baltzer by David Nir, an Israeli Jew, hi-tech entrepreneur and member of the Israqeli-Palestinian peace group Ta'ayush, who stayed over in Yanun during the winter of 2002–3, two internationals staying to defend the villagers by their presence at the time were kidnapped by Ran, who also confiscated their expensive camera. Marched to his outpost, they were stripped of their shoes and jackets and made to lie face down in mud under pouring rain. When the Israeli, David, intervened to retrieve the camera equipment, accompanied by 4 IDF soldiers, he states that he had his nose broken and part of his skull crushed when Ran smashed his face with the butt of his rifle. The case went to court: one of the four soldiers confirmed the incident, the other three denied it; photos taken by the soldiers had disappeared from the record. Ran was let off. The Israeli speculated that Ran must be very well connected. (Note: "It's true that he's been acquitted of all the charges against him, but the army investigations and subsequent trials against him have been a joke." (Friedman 2012))

On 20 March 2005, two assaults on Palestinians were reported to the Israeli police regarding a shepherd, and a farmer, Abu Shehada, engaged in ploughing a clover field on his own land. As a result of an investigation four settlers, including Ran, were indicted and Ran was placed under house arrest, which he violated with impunity. In August 2005, he went into hiding when Israeli police were trying to track him down. Tried in Kfar Saba's Magistrate's Court in 2006, three were acquitted, including Ran; the other had pleaded guilty in exchange for an early release from detention. Ran, who had been held in custody for five months, and had originally admitted in a deposition that he had indeed attacked the plaintiff, claimed the land was his own, a charge which the presiding judge said could not be verified, while blaming the police for failing to investigate the claims. He changed his testimony, denying any assault had taken place, (Although his statement to the police was laconic and did not correspond to the other defendants' testimonies, (Nava) Bechor said his testimony gave the impression of being reliable and coherent, and provided a reasonable explanation for giving the police a false statement.') and was acquitted on the specific charge of beating up a Palestinian farmer and damaging his tractor by ripping out its wiring.

Months earlier, he had been convicted of attacking an Israeli-Arab and was sentenced to a six-month suspended sentence. In January 2006, the judge – ruling that she could not establish Ran's claim to the land – instead acquitted him and two other defendants, saying that the Arab claimant's testimony was unreliable.

== Dispute with Itamar over land ==
In 2013, some Itamar settlers claimed he had taken over land, an 866 meter high hill they call Mitzpeh Shloshet Hayamim, which they asserted belongs to Itamar. They stated that he had bulldozed it to expand the infrastructure of his own enterprise. The location of the hill in question is also under dispute. Some claim that it lies outside the official jurisdiction of the regional governing authority, the Samaria Regional Council.

== Business interests ==
Anthropologist Michael Feige considers Ran to be representative of a privatization of the settler enterprise, since the criterion for establishing a Jewish presence on Palestinian territory emerges from the "whims of eccentric individuals", rather than stemming from a group project.

The sprawling farm complex they built produces and markets organic eggs, cheese and other locally grown foodstuffs sold under the logo "Giv'ot Olam". Ran is now Israel's largest supplier of free-range organic eggs.

== Notable remarks ==
"The Arabs are not afraid of me. They revere me. They are wary of me, yes. Have I set out regulations? Certainly. There is not one Arab in the Nablus region who dares to work contrary to my rules. Every Arab knows this. What does this say? This says that there is a Jew in town, a son of Abraham our father-that the ancient Jews have returned a little to the Land of Israel. And a Jew must be respected.."

== Sources ==
- Arad, Dafna (24 April 2012). "Farming in the West Bank: Organic paradise, thorny reality". Haaretz.
- Baltzer, Anna (2007). Witness in Palestine: A Jewish Woman in the Occupied Territories. Routledge. ISBN 978-1-594-51307-7.
- Bar'el, Zvi (17 January 2006). "Hilltop youth leader Avri Ran acquitted". Haaretz. Archived from the original on 3 November 2012.
- Barnea, Nahum (4 April 2005). "Salt of the Earth". Ynet.
- Berger, Yotam (25 October 2018). "Revealed: Israeli Taxpayers Helped Bankroll Illegal West Bank Outposts for Decades". Haaretz.
- Byman, Daniel (2011). A High Price: The Triumphs and Failures of Israeli Counterterrorism. Oxford University Press. ISBN 978-0-199-83045-9.
- Feige, Michael (2009). Settling in the Hearts: Jewish Fundamentalism in the Occupied Territories. Wayne State University Press. ISBN 978-0-814-32750-0.
- Friedman, Andrew (10 July 2012). "The hills are alive". The Jerusalem Post.
- Gilbert, Lela (2012). Saturday People, Sunday People: Israel through the Eyes of a Christian Sojourner. Encounter Books. ISBN 978-1-594-03652-1.
- Grosglik, Rafi (2021). Globalizing Organic: Nationalism, Neoliberalism, and Alternative Food in Israel. SUNY Press. ISBN 9781438481579.
- Grosglik, Rafi; Handel, Ariel; Monterescu, Daniel (1 October 2021). "Soil, territory, land: The spatial politics of settler organic farming in the West Bank, Israel/Palestine". Environment and Planning D: Society and Space. 39 (5): 906–924. Bibcode:2021EnPlD..39..906G. doi:10.1177/02637758211041121. S2CID 239053644.
- "Gvaot Olam". Who Profits.
- "Separate and Unequal:Israel's Discriminatory Treatment of Palestinians in the Occupied Palestinian Territories" (PDF). Human Rights Watch. 19 December 2010. ISBN 978-1-56432-729-1.
- Kershner, Isabelle (25 September 2008). "Radical Settlers Take On Israel". The New York Times.
- Kotef, Hagar (2020). The Colonizing Self or, home and homelessness in israel/palestine. Duke University Press. doi:10.2307/j.ctv18zhcq3.17. ISBN 978-1-478-01286-3. S2CID 242584053.
- Lavie, Aviv (8 April 2003). "The Sheriff". Haaretz. Archived from the original on 24 November 2018.
- Levinson, Chaim (31 January 2013). "Israeli 'Hilltop Youth' Accuse Their Former Hero of Stealing Settlers' Land". Haaretz.
- O'Loughlin, Ed (28 June 2003). "Running the snipers' gauntlet in the West Bank's frontier of hate". The Sydney Morning Herald.
- Pedahzur, Ami (2012). The Triumph of Israel's Radical Right. Oxford University Press. ISBN 978-0-199-74470-1.
- Pedahzur, Ami; Perliger, Arie (2009). Jewish Terrorism in Israel. Columbia University Press. ISBN 978-0-231-52075-1.
- Shalom, Oded (3 July 2017). "Land of dispute: tour of the West Bank, 50 years after Six-Day War". Ynet.
- Shlaim, Avi (2015) [First published 2000]. The Iron Wall: Israel and the Arab World (2nd ed.). Penguin UK. ISBN 978-0-141-97678-5.
- Snegaroff, Claire; Blum, Michaël (2005). Qui sont les colons: une enquête, de Gaza à la Cisjordanie. Flammarion. ISBN 978-2-082-10363-3.
- Traubmann, Tamara (2 August 2007). "It's organic, but where was it grown?". Haaretz. Archived from the original on 26 June 2020.
