= Avihai =

Avihai (Hebrew: אֲבִיחַי, lit. My father lives), sometimes spelled Avichai, is a Hebrew name, commonly found in Israel. It may refer to:

== People ==
- Avichai Mandelblit (born 1963), Israeli jurist
- Avichai Rontzki (1951–2018), Israeli rabbi
- Avihai Yadin (born 1986), Israeli footballer

== Fictional characters ==
- Avihai, a character in the TV show Fauda
