= Aqraba, Nablus =

Palestinian town in the Nablus Governorate

Aqraba عقربا
- Municipality type C

Arabic transcription(s)
  - Arabic: عقربا
  - Latin: 'Aqraba (official); Akraba (unofficial)
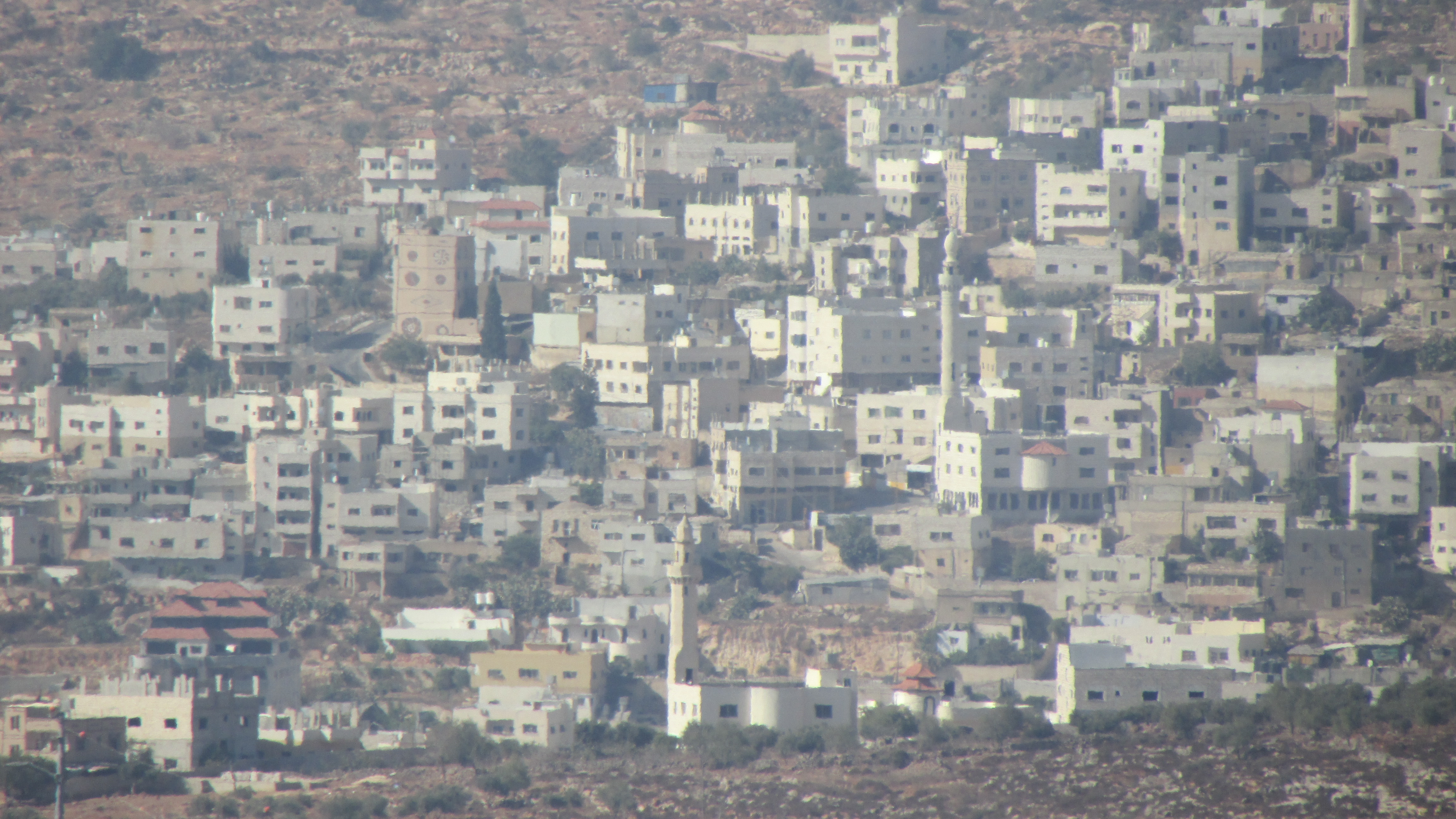
- Aqraba

- Location of Aqraba within Palestine
- Coordinates: 32°07′35″N 35°20′37″E
- Palestine grid: 182/170
- State: State of Palestine
- Governorate: Nablus

Government
  - Type: Municipality
  - Head of Municipality: Jawdat 'Abd al-Hadi

Area
  - Total: 34.7 km^{2} (13.4 sq mi)

Population (2017)
  - Total: 10,024
  - Density: 289/km^{2} (748/sq mi)
- Name meaning: Scorpion

Aqraba (Arabic: عقربا, romanized: ʿAqrabā) is a Palestinian town in the Nablus Governorate, located eighteen kilometers southeast of Nablus in the northern West Bank. According to the Palestinian Central Bureau of Statistics (PCBS), Aqraba had a population of 10,024 inhabitants in 2017.

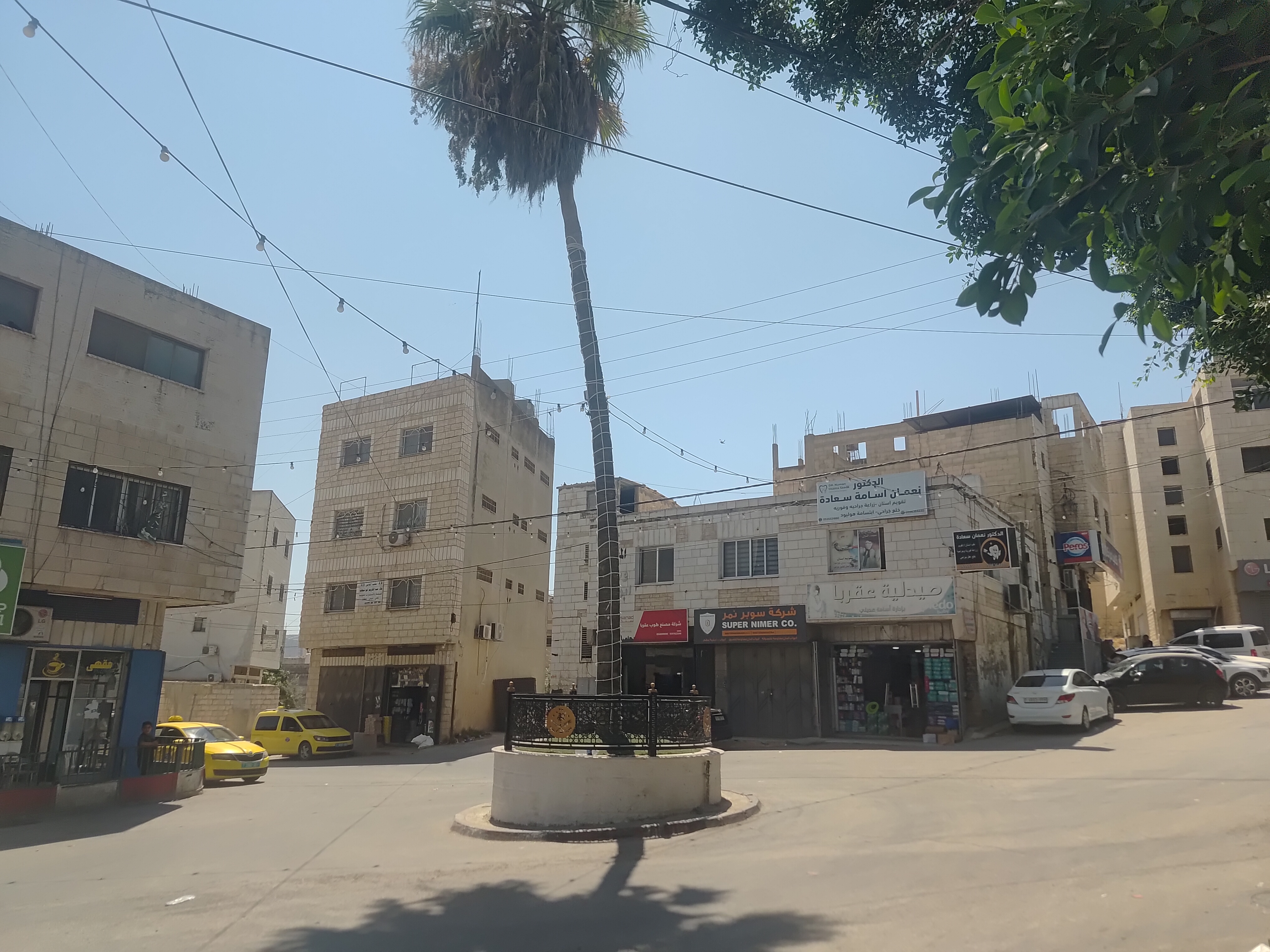
Aqraba

According to Applied Research Institute–Jerusalem since 1967, Israel has confiscated 1,425 dunums of Aqraba and Yanun's land for use for settlements, Israeli Military bases and for the Wall Zone. According to Kerem Navot, 3,265 dunams of mostly cultivated land were seized per military order T12/72 and transferred to the settlement of Gittit. Nearby hamlets surround the village and are considered to be natural extensions of Aqraba; they are the khirbets of al-Arama, al-Kroom, Abu ar-Reisa, ar-Rujman, Firas ad-Din and Tell al-Khashaba. The total population of these hamlets was estimated to be 500 in 2008. The prominent families of Aqraba are Al Dayriyeh, Bani Jaber, Al-Mayadima, Bani Jame', and Bani Fadel.

== Etymology ==
The origin of the name is Semitic - Canaanite or Aramaic. In Arabic 'aqraba' means "scorpion".

== History and archaeology ==
Pottery sherds from Iron Age II, Hellenistic, Roman, Byzantine, Umayyad and Crusader/Ayyubid period, as well as rock-hewn cisterns have been found in Aqraba. In 1874 surveyors found near the village rock-cut kokhim tombs.

Ancient texts referencing Aqraba or the toparchy named after it include 1 Maccabees, Book of Jubilees (Ethiopian version), Pliny, Josephus, documents discovered in the Wadi Murabba'at caves, Mishnah, and Epiphanus' AD 392 work On Weights and Measures (Syriac version), and it is also mentioned in the Tolidah (a Samaritan chronicle compiled in the 12th-19th centuries), and KafPer.

=== Late Hellenistic and Roman periods ===
During the Second Temple period it was an important town (see Mishna, Ma'aser Sheni 5:2), named by Josephus (37–c. 100) as Akrabbatá, the capital of a district called Akrabbatène (Wars 3:3, 5). Eusebius calls the town 'Akrabbeim and the district Akrabbatinés.

A few km to the northwest are the remains of a mountaintop Hasmonean-Herodian fortress, at the site known as Khirbet el-'Ormeh.

=== Byzantine period ===
Aqraba was inhabited by Christians during the Byzantine period. A Syriac document notes that the village contained two Byzantine-period monasteries named for saints Titus and Stephan. According to local tradition and British scholars, the mosque was built over a Byzantine-period church. A sixth-century Syriac letter refers to monasteries of St Stephen and St Titus here.

=== Early Muslim period ===
The inhabitants of Aqraba became Muslim during the Early Muslim period (630s–1099). Shihab al-Din Ahmad al-Aqrabani, a follower of the noted Muslim jurist al-Shafi'i, lived and was buried there in 180 AH/796–797 CE. The 14th-century historian Ibn Hajar al-Asqalani mentions an 8th-century member of the Lakhm tribe from Aqraba as among the transmitters of a hadith (Islamic tradition).

=== Crusader/Ayyubid and Mamuk periods ===
Several medieval buildings and other remains described in the 1930s and 1940s were still visible in the 1990s. These include a fortified courtyard building northwest of the mosque known as al-Hisn ("the castle") dominating the village from its highest point, an open cistern or pool (Arabic:birka) in the centre of the village, and a domed building said to be Mamluk, probably a mosque, used as the village school. The mosque's mihrab was flanked by marble columns topped by capitals, both from the Crusader period.

The village mosque is built on the remains of a church, and in the Survey of Western Palestine the Greek inscriptions found there on a lintel decorated by a cross, are described as similar to Timeline of the Crusader period ones.

Pottery sherds from the Mamluk period and a construction inscription in Arabic from 1414 have been found in the village.

=== Ottoman period ===
Aqraba, like the rest of Palestine, was incorporated into the Ottoman Empire in 1517, and in the census of 1596 the village was recorded in the nahiya (subdistrict) of Jabal Qubal, part of Sanjak Nablus, with a population of 102 households, all Muslim. They paid a fixed tax-rate of 33.3% on agricultural products, including wheat, barley, summer crops, olive trees, goats and bee-hives; vineyards and fruit trees, in addition to occasional revenues, and a press for olive oil or grape syrup; a total of 3,960 akçe.

During his travels in the region in 1838, Edward Robinson mentions it, believing it was ancient Acrabi. The French traveler Victor Guérin visited in 1870, and described it as a large town with 2,000 inhabitants. He further noted that it consisted of four quarters, each headed by a sheikh. Clermont-Ganneau came in 1873-74 and was told of the governor el Kadery, who resided in Aqraba at the time of Jezzar Pasha. He is said to have erected considerable buildings in the town.

In 1882, the PEF's Survey of Western Palestine described it as "A large village, surrounded with olives, of houses better built than most in the country. It stands on a saddle between two hills, one of which rises north of it 700 feet, the village standing at the mouth of a pass, through which the main road runs. The place is crescent-shaped, whence perhaps its name, 'curved.' To the south is the fertile plain (Jehir 'Akrabeh). There is a mosque in the east part of the village, founded on the remains of a Christian church, and a second sacred place (er Rafái) on the south." The estimated population was 600 to 800 souls.

=== British Mandate period ===
In the 1922 census of Palestine conducted by the British Mandate authorities, Aqraba had a population of 1,160; 1,158 Muslims and 2 Orthodox Christians, increasing in the 1931 census, where Aqraba (together with the smaller location Kh. Fasayil) had a population of 1,478, all Muslims, in a total of 309 houses.

In the 1945 statistics Aqraba (including Kh. Fasayil) had a population of 2,060, all Muslims, with 142,530 dunams of land, according to an official land and population survey. Of this, 3,383 dunams were plantations and irrigable land, 19,732 used for cereals, while 55 dunams were built-up (urban) land.

=== Jordanian period ===
In the wake of the 1948 Arab–Israeli War, following the 1949 Armistice Agreements, Aqraba was ruled by Jordan. In 1961, the population of Aqraba was 2,875.

=== Israeli occupation ===
Since the Six-Day War in 1967, Aqraba has been under Israeli occupation.

According to Applied Research Institute–Jerusalem (ARIJ), Israel has confiscated 1,085 dunums of land from Aqraba and Yanun, for the settlements of Gitit and Itamar, whereby the land for Gitit was taken from Aqraba, while the land for Itamar was taken from Yanun. A later estimate states that the total extent of Aqraba lands amounted to 36,000 acres (145,000 dunams), of which 83% were confiscated, leaving the 4,000 residents with 6,000 acres (25,000 dunams). The acquisition of land from Aqraba for the establishment of Gitit involved aerial spraying with poison.

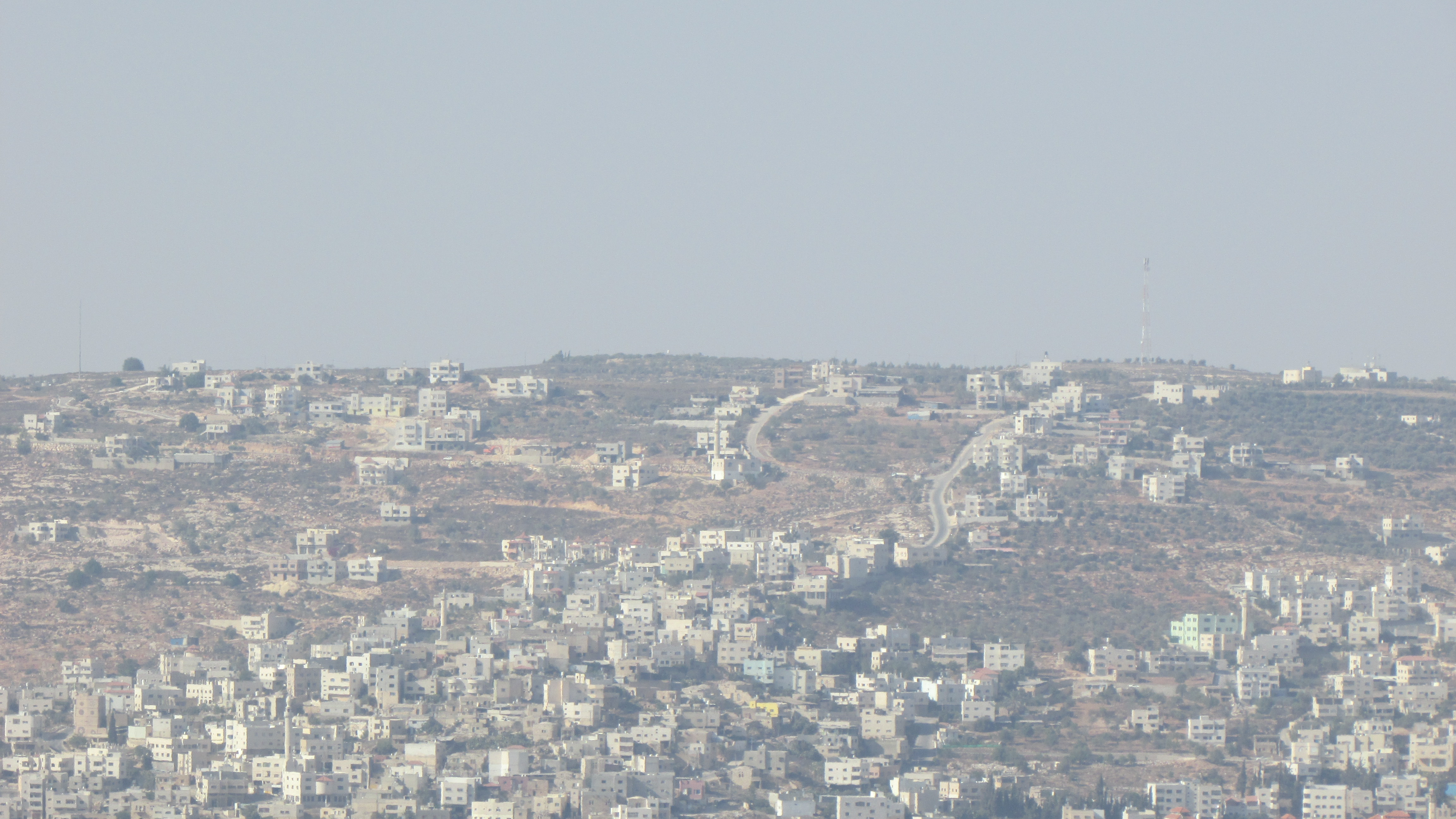
A view of Aqraba

Some farmland near Yanun owned by 300 Aqraba villagers was classified as an IDF firing range in 1967, but exercises were customarily suspended for brief periods in the past to allow the villagers access to their lands, according to local Palestinians. Since then they claim, the area has not been used as a firing range for two decades. Recently, as of 2012, these villagers, who either farm or live there, have been denied access. They claim that this restriction does not apply equally to the Givat 777 outpost of the Itamar Israeli settlement. They complain of settler harassment, the burning of vehicles, and of settler sheep flocks being led to graze on their wheat fields. The IDF has replied that both Palestinians and Israeli settlers are treated in the same way.

In August 2014, the IDF brought in bulldozers to demolish 4 Palestinian homes on the outskirts of the town, in the al-Taweel neighbourhood, claiming that they were built without a permit. However, the villagers claimed that the houses had been there for a century.

In October 2014, a village mosque was set alight in a suspected arson attack by Israeli settlers as part of a "price tag" attack. A similar arson attack took place in April 2018, with settlers also spraying graffiti on the mosque walls.

== Economy ==
The village's total land area is 34,700 dunams, of which 1,783 is built-up area. Around 62% of the remaining land is covered with olive and almond groves, 8% with other fruits and vegetables and the remaining 30% for grazing purposes. Sources of employment include public sector jobs, agriculture and industry.

== Government ==
31% of Aqraba and Yanun land are located in Area B, giving the Palestinian National Authority control over its administration and civil affairs. The rest, 69%, is in Area C.

The town is governed by a municipal council, consisting of eleven members including the mayor. In the 2005 Palestinian municipal elections, the Fatah-backed Future Palestine list won the majority of the seats (six) while the Hamas-backed al-Islamiya list won five seats. Jawdat 'Abd al-Hadi was elected mayor.

== Bibliography ==
- Barron, J.B., ed. (1923). Palestine: Report and General Abstracts of the Census of 1922. Government of Palestine.
- Clermont-Ganneau, C.S. (1896). [ARP] Archaeological Researches in Palestine 1873-1874, translated from the French by J. McFarlane. Vol. 2. London: Palestine Exploration Fund.
- Conder, C.R. (1876). "Samarian Topography". Quarterly Statement - Palestine Exploration Fund. 8 (4): 182–197. doi:10.1179/peq.1876.8.4.182.
- Conder, C.R.; Kitchener, H.H. (1882). The Survey of Western Palestine: Memoirs of the Topography, Orography, Hydrography, and Archaeology. Vol. 2. London: Committee of the Palestine Exploration Fund.
- Dauphin, C. (1998). La Palestine byzantine, Peuplement et Populations. BAR International Series 726 (in French). Vol. III : Catalogue. Oxford: Archeopress. ISBN 0-860549-05-4.
- Ellenblum, R. (2003). Frankish Rural Settlement in the Latin Kingdom of Jerusalem. Cambridge University Press. ISBN 9780521521871. (pp. 228, 266-7)
- Finkelstein, I.; Lederman, Zvi, eds. (1997). Highlands of many cultures. Tel Aviv: Institute of Archaeology of Tel Aviv University Publications Section. ISBN 965-440-007-3.
- Government of Jordan, Department of Statistics (1964). First Census of Population and Housing. Volume I: Final Tables; General Characteristics of the Population (PDF).
- Government of Palestine, Department of Statistics (1945). Village Statistics, April, 1945.
- Guérin, V. (1875). Description Géographique Historique et Archéologique de la Palestine (in French). Vol. 2: Samarie, pt. 2. Paris: L'Imprimerie Nationale.
- Hadawi, S. (1970). Village Statistics of 1945: A Classification of Land and Area ownership in Palestine. Palestine Liberation Organization Research Center.
- Hütteroth, W.-D.; Abdulfattah, K. (1977). Historical Geography of Palestine, Transjordan and Southern Syria in the Late 16th Century. Erlanger Geographische Arbeiten, Sonderband 5. Erlangen, Germany: Vorstand der Fränkischen Geographischen Gesellschaft. ISBN 3-920405-41-2.
- Mills, E., ed. (1932). Census of Palestine 1931. Population of Villages, Towns and Administrative Areas. Jerusalem: Government of Palestine.
- Neubauer, A. (1868). La géographie du Talmud : mémoire couronné par l'Académie des inscriptions et belles-lettres (in French). Paris: Lévy. (p. 159)
- Palmer, E.H. (1881). The Survey of Western Palestine: Arabic and English Name Lists Collected During the Survey by Lieutenants Conder and Kitchener, R. E. Transliterated and Explained by E.H. Palmer. Committee of the Palestine Exploration Fund.
- Pringle, D. (1997). Secular Buildings in the Crusader Kingdom of Jerusalem: An Archaeological Gazetteer, 'Aqraba (no. 18). Cambridge University Press. ISBN 9780521460101. "Fortified courtyard building (al-Hisn) at highest point of the village, NW ofmosque, consisting of rectangular courtyard between two parallel rows of vaults, entered on E through arched gate flanked by projecting towers. Mosque contains Crusader capitals on fluted marble columns, flanking the mihrab (1947). / PAM: Reports by Anon (15 Feb.1937) and S.A.S. Husseini (14 June 1947). Conder and Kitchhner 1881: II, 386, 389: Palestine 1929; 148: 116."
- Pringle, D. (2009). The Churches of the Crusader Kingdom of Jerusalem: The cities of Acre and Tyre with Addenda and Corrigenda to Volumes I-III. Vol. IV. Cambridge University Press. p. 235. ISBN 978-0-521-85148-0. "The medieval buildings in 'Aqraba noted in the 1930s and 1940s included a fortified courtyard building (al-Hisn), a birka and a building with a dome and drum carried on pendentives (cf. Pringle 1997: 20. no. 18)"
- Robinson, E.; Smith, E. (1841). Biblical Researches in Palestine, Mount Sinai and Arabia Petraea: A Journal of Travels in the year 1838. Vol. 3. Boston: Crocker & Brewster.
- Sharon, M. (1997). Corpus Inscriptionum Arabicarum Palaestinae: A. Vol. 1. Brill. pp. 110-111. ISBN 90-04-10833-5.
