= Itamar (Israeli settlement) =

Israeli settlement in the West Bank

Itamar: אִיתָמָר (Hebrew)
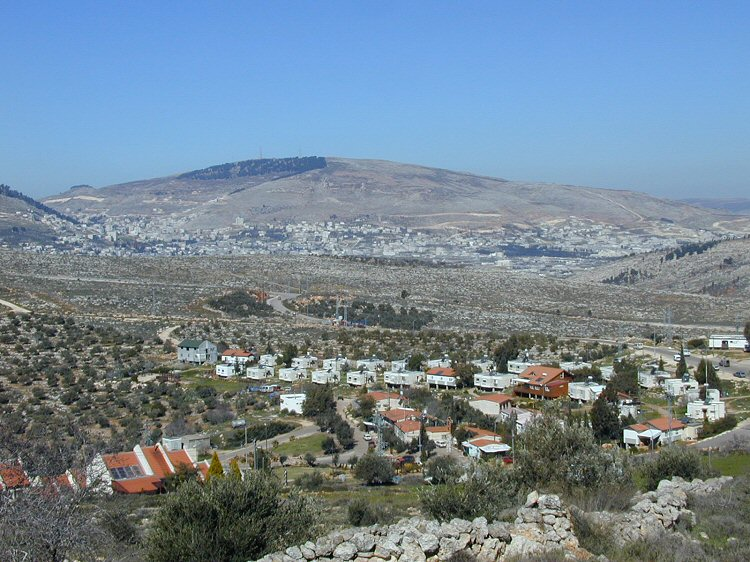

- Location within the Northern West Bank
- Coordinates: 32°10′27″N 35°18′30″E
- Country: Palestine
- District: Judea and Samaria Area
- Council: Shomron
- Region: West Bank
- Affiliation: Amana
- Founded: 1984
- Founder: Amana
- Population (2024): 1,759

Itamar (Hebrew: אִיתָמָר) is an Israeli settlement located in the West Bank's Samarian mountains, five kilometers southeast of the Palestinian city of Nablus. The predominantly Orthodox and Religious Zionist Jewish community falls in part within the municipal jurisdiction of the Shomron Regional Council. Under the terms of the Oslo Accords of 1993 between Israel and the Palestine Liberation Organization, Itamar was designated Area "C", under provisional Israeli civil and security control, before a transition period after which Area "C" was to be handed back to the Palestinians. In 2024, it had a population of 1,759.

The international community considers Israeli settlements in the West Bank illegal under international law, but the Israeli government disputes this. The settlement has several outposts and covers a total area of approximately 7,000 dunams of land.

Itamar's residents have been the target of several lethal attacks by Palestinian militants, most notably the 2011 massacre of the Fogel family by residents of the nearby village of Awarta. HRW reports an extensive number of violent acts by settlers from Itamar and its outposts against local Palestinians.

== History ==
According to ARIJ, Itamar was founded on land which Israel had confiscated from several nearby Palestinian villages:

- 2,450 dunums were taken from Awarta,
- 441 dunums were taken from Beit Furik for Itamar and Michola,
- 1,085 dunums were taken from Yanun/Aqraba for Itamar and Gitit.
- 169 dunes were taken from Rujeib.

The settlement was established in 1984 by several families from the Machon Meir Yeshiva in Jerusalem with the assistance of Gush Emunim's settlement organization Amana. Originally named Tel Chaim, commemorating Chaim Landau, it was later named for Ithamar, the youngest son of Biblical figure Aaron (Exodus 28:1). Tradition places the burial place of Ithamar in the nearby Palestinian village Awarta. The major of the city argues that the deed title for taking over the land is based on biblical writ. According to Palestinians at Yanun, before the al-Aqsa Intifada, relations between local villagers and Itamar, the nearest legal settlement, had been on a good footing. After the killing of 13 Israeli Arabs in Jerusalem, matters rapidly deteriorated, and over 3 years, Palestinian militants killed some 11 Itamar settlers. In Itamar, blame for these killings was laid at the door of local Palestinian villagers, who–according to Californian emigrant Alon Zimmerman–were believed to provide militants with local support. The whole village of Yanun, though never linked to any violence or attack, itself was so harassed by local Itamar hilltop settlers that its entire population was put to flight, and sought refuge in Awarta, and became, according to Joel Greenberg 'the first case in memory in which harassment by Jewish settlers has emptied an entire Palestinian community'. At the time of the uprising, Itamar had a reputation among Israelis one of the hard core settlements. One visitor at the time remarked that many of its recent residents were immigrants from the former Soviet empire, and from Argentina, who spoke poor Hebrew, dwelt in trailers, and appeared to have little awareness of where they were or why anyone should object to their presence there.

The Itamar settlement is the object of land disputes. The borders of the settlement stretch out south-east to take in an area 14 times the actual area of construction, in a way that completely blocks any possibility for the development of the Palestinian village, of Beit Furiq, which has a population of 9,000. A 2006 Peace Now analysis provided the following breakdown of the situation at Itamar: The settlement area extended over 4.780 square kilometres (1,181 acres) of which 2.094 square kilometers (517 acres) or 43.80% was private land. The land owned by Jews amounted to 0.002 square kilometres (0.49 acres) or 0.05%. A follow-up report specified that in the data provided by the Israeli Civil Administration, "there is no mention of whether the private land is owned by Palestinians or by Jews privately owned... Nevertheless, it is highly probable that most of the land that is marked here as private land (if not all of it) is privately owned Palestinian land". The settlement of Itamar, not including the outposts, grew from a population of less than 300 in 1995 to 785 in 2008, and reached a population of over 1,000 in 2009, predominantly Orthodox Jewish settlers, most of them newly religious. Locals state that low property prices account for part of the attraction, with a three-bedroom Itamar house priced around £75,000, compared to roughly £375,000 in Jerusalem. According to resident Leah Zak, following the Fogel family massacre, much of the community became invested in growing and developing Itamar; this included naming several social projects after members of the Fogel family. In the year following the attack, it was reported that 21 families had moved to Itamar.

== Geography ==
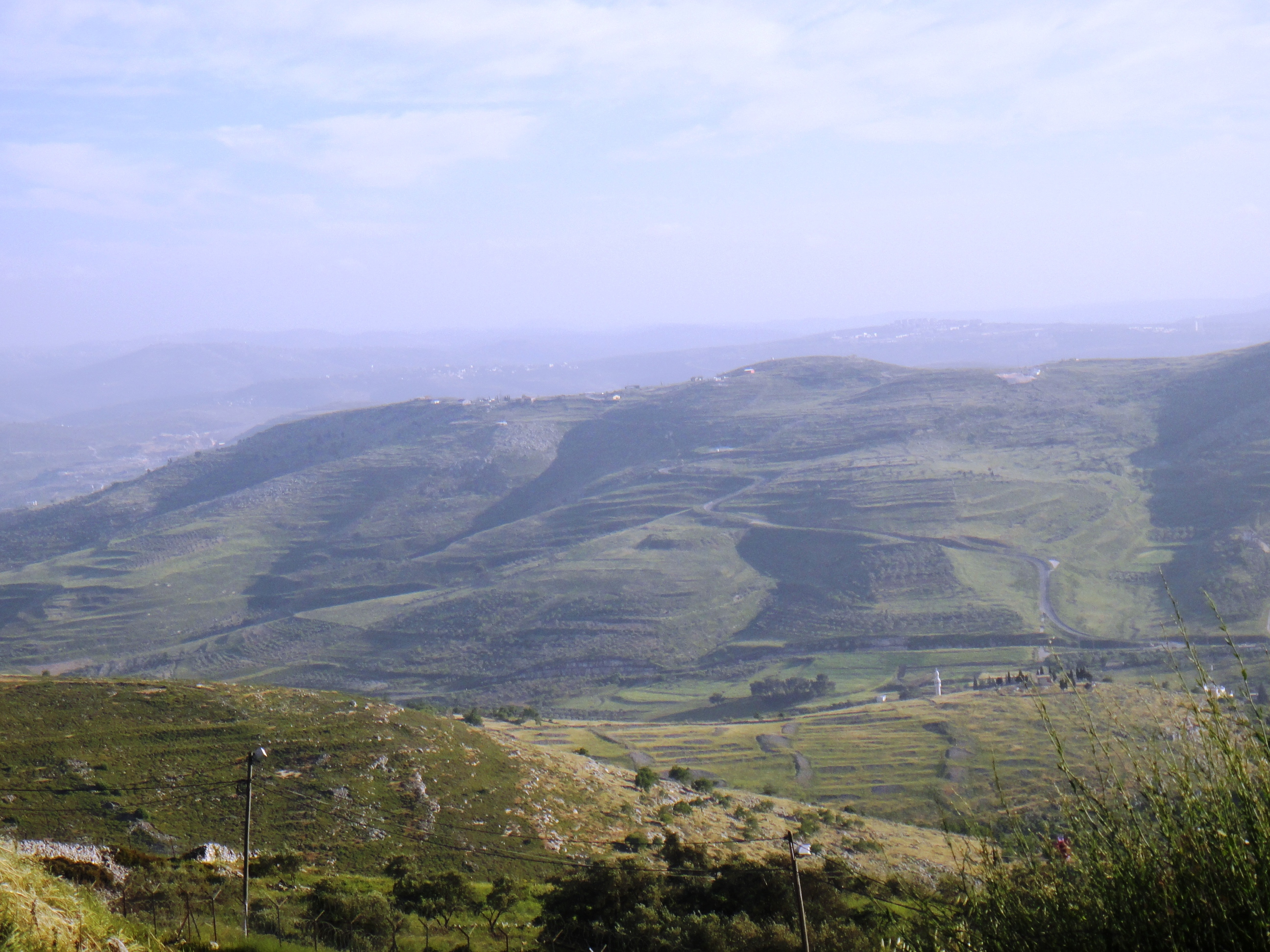
Samarian hills, 2011

Itamar is situated east of the Israeli West Bank barrier, 28 kilometers from the Green line in the region known as "Gav Hahar" (Hump of the Mountain). Its municipal boundaries extend in a south-east diagonal over an area of some 7,000 dunam including several outposts, the furthest of which is about eight kilometers from Itamar. Itamar and its outposts partly encircled the small Palestinian village of Yanun, and block the development of the Palestinian town of Beit Furik, according to a report by Israeli human rights organization B'tselem.

In the 1990s, Itamar seized the surrounding hills, establishing the outposts The Point in 1996, Hill 836, Hill 851 and Giv'ot Olam in 1998, Hill 777 and Hill 782 in 1999, and in 2002 Itamar North. Five of these outposts were approved by former prime minister Ehud Barak in 2000. At the time, a master plan gave the settlement a total area of some 6,000 dunams. In addition to Itamar, three other settlements are located in the Harey Kadem mountains: Yitzhar, Har Bracha, and Elon Moreh.

Leah Goldsmith, the wife of Rabbi Moshe Goldsmith, wrote about the town:

It is hill country, tremendously big, picturesque and mysterious, varied with long and wide valleys who resemble a mosaic coat of many colors ranging from pea to deep jade greens and chestnut browns in the winter and spring months. In the summertime the colors are dry, like the colors of Rebecca's jug, in which she served Eliezer and the camels in Babylon.

There are springs and wells in the hills. The bounty stemming from the blessing given to Joseph…."The blessings of the father are potent above the blessings of my progenitors to the utmost bounds of the everlasting hills"(Vayechi 49). The tribunal portions of Ephraim and Menashe, the sons of Joseph run across these highlands. In every direction that one looks, the views are emanated with authentic biblical greatness and Jewish nobility. This is the chief feature of the landscape, of your life in it, and you are struck by the feeling of having lived here in the past.

== Economy ==
Itamar was among the settlements which were designated a "national priority zone" in December 2009, and is entitled to an average of NIS 1,000 per person per year in subsidies in addition to the ordinary settlement subsidies.

There are several businesses in the settlement, and many of the residents grow organic crops and raise sheep and goats; larger farms produce a range of further products, such as cheese and olive oil. According to local residents, 80% of Israel's domestically sold organic eggs are produced at Itamar's chicken farm. Other businesses include a yogurt and cheese factory; a small perfume factory; a stained glass workshop; and a hothouses for the vegetables. Itamar also has programs for people with physical or learning disabilities.

== Education ==
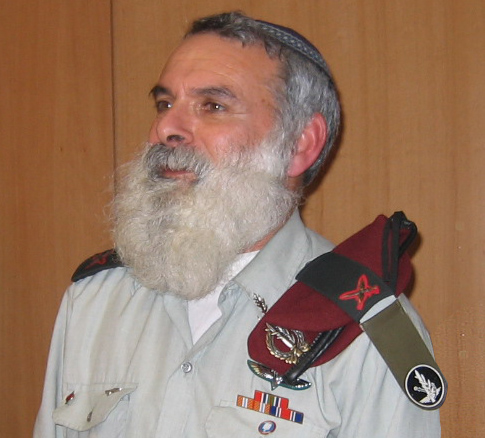
Avichai Rontzki, founder of Hesder yeshiva

Itamar's educational system includes kindergarten, elementary school for boys and girls, and several institutions of secondary education and higher learning which attract Israeli students other regional settlements such as Yitzhar. Among them are a Talmud Torah for boys, the Be'er Miriam Talmud Torah for girls, the Hitzim yeshiva high school for boys, co-founded by Rabbi Moshe Goldsmith and the Itamar Hesder yeshiva founded by Rabbi Brigadier General Avichai Ronsky, IDF Chief Rabbi from 2006 till 2010.

In March 2012, three children and a teacher were killed in the shooting attack at Otzar Hatorah school in Toulouse, France. Three months later, Tamar Fogel, a survivor of the Fogel family massacre, and a group Bnei Akiva youth visited France "to help strengthen the local Jewish communities". Yigal Klein, director of counselors for Bnei Akiva, said, "Many members of the Jewish delegation in France thought they would strengthen the youth of Itamar during their visit, but the opposite was true. The Itamar delegation demonstrated faith and spiritual strength that surprised many of the adults and youth whom they met."

== Israeli–Palestinian conflict ==
Itamar and its residents have been targeted several times by Palestinians terrorists in the past, three such incidents taking place between May and July 2002, a fourth in August 2004 and another in 2011, which have caused more than a dozen deaths while the UN Office for the Coordination of Humanitarian Affairs (UNOCHA), human rights organisations and media report an extensive number of violent acts by Itamar settlers against local Palestinians. According to B'Tselem, "settlers from these settlements have exerted violence against local Palestinians; the Israeli authorities have been delinquent in enforcing the law on the offenders". One of Itamar's founders, Brigadier General Avichai Ronski, in the wake of the Fogel massacre, went on record advocating collective punishment for Palestinian villages when any of their residents are found to be responsible for a murder of a Jew:

"A village like this, like Awarta, from which the murderers of the Fogel family and of the Shebo family emerged, must suffer as a village. A situation must be created whereby the inhabitants prevent anyone in this village from harming Jews. Yes, it is collective punishment. They must not be allowed to sleep at night, they must not be allowed to go to work, they must not be allowed to drive their cars. There are many ways."

=== Palestinian victims ===
Yaacov Hayman, a Californian immigrant to Itamar, told an interviewer at the outbreak of Al-Aqsa Intifada in 2000: "There comes a time when if you want to have peace you have to make war." In 2002, Palestinian villagers near Itamar claimed they were not involved in attacks, and asked why they should be punished for them. Yaacov Hayman also denied settlers killed anyone, but stated that local Palestinians must not be allowed to work near their settlement: "If they can't live like human beings, they won't pick olives here. They'll starve here. I don't care. They won't be here to butcher us." The IDF prohibit Palestinian farmers from working at their fields close to the settlement, but are required to protect them during the olive harvest. However, residents of Itamar and its outposts have been reported harassing local Palestinians, damaging their property and obstructing their access to land, particularly during the olive harvest. They have reportedly stolen olives, prevented Palestinian farmers from reaching their land, even when accompanied by international activists, and shot at farmers picking their olives, or grazing their animals. It is alleged that they have set fire to hundreds of olive trees and thousands of dunam of cultivated land belonging to local Palestinians. The small village of Yanun, which is flanked by the settlement's outposts, particularly suffered from constant harassment, which caused the villagers to abandon their village in October 2002 and move to the larger nearby village of Aqraba.

In some cases, the violence has resulted in death.

- 26 October 1998 – Muhammad Suliman Az-Zalmut, a 70-year-old Palestinian farmer, was bludgeoned to death with a 20-pound rock in an unprovoked attack by Gur Hamel, a 26-year-old Itamar settler and yeshiva student who was under an expulsion order from the IDF after being involved in several violent incidents with Palestinian farmers. He encountered Zalout while walking to Givot Olam.
- 7 October 2001 An Itamar settler went to the Palestinian orchards of Aqraba and opened fire at farmers, killing one Palestinian and moderately wounding two others.
- 17 October 2001 – Near Itamar, settlers murdered Farid Musa Issa Nasasrah from Beit Furik, and wounded three other Palestinians villagers. Two Itamar residents, Yaron Degani and Gad Tena, were subsequently arrested on suspicion for the shooting, but were released for insufficient evidence after five days.
- 6 October 2002 – during the olive harvest, Hani Bani Maniya and his cousin Fouad from Aqraba were shot by settlers after running to the assistance of Fadi Beni Jabar, who had been shot in the hand. Maniya died of gunshot wounds shortly afterwards, outside of Nablus where the ambulance had been stopped at an Israeli roadblock. IDF officers said off the record that a group of settlers had been intentionally attacking Palestinians during their olive harvest. Palestinian sources said 10 armed settlers from nearby Gidonim and Itamar were involved.
- 27 September 2004 – Itamar resident Yehoshua Elitzur shot and killed Sael A-Shatiya (Sa'il Mustafa Ahmad Jabarah), a Palestinian taxi driver from Salem, reportedly when the latter slowed his car to ask whether Elitzur needed assistance near the Itamar junction. Police initially concluded the shooting was in self-defence. Elitzur was convicted of manslaughter, was released to house arrest, did not show up in court for sentencing and disappeared. He was eventually arrested by Interpol in San Paolo on 18 July 2015, and after a long legal battle, extradited to Israel where in May 2018 he was sentenced to 15 years in prison, and ordered to pay compensation to his victim's family of 200,000 shekels ($55,500). The story has been told in a 2019 documentary, "Chasing Yehoshua", produced by Shay Fogelman.
- 20 March 2010 – two Awarta teenagers, the cousins Salah Qawariq, 18, and Muhammad Qawariq, 19, were shot dead, while on their way to their farmland, in unclear circumstances, a day after two others from nearby villages had been shot dead during a confrontation with the Israeli army. The IDF said it was responsible, while Palestinian sources claimed Itamar settlers had attacked the boys, or that their deaths had been caused by a settler militia from Itamar. An IDF spokeswoman initially replied that the two had tried to stab a soldier on patrol. In a later version, the IDF took full responsibility, announcing that the deaths were unnecessary and could have been avoided. Autopsies indicated they had been shot at close range, with some of the bullet trajectories suggesting they had been killed while seated or kneeling.

=== Israeli victims ===
Residents of Itamar who were killed in attacks outside the settlement include Gilad Zar (41), Meir Lixenberg (38), Matan Zagron (22), and Eliyahu Asheri (18). Zar, the son of settlement leader Moshe Zar and one of Itamar's founders who worked as security officer of the Shomron Regional Council, was shot dead in an ambush by Palestinian terrorists in May 2001 while driving in the West Bank between Kedumim and Yitzhar. Lixenberg was shot and killed in a roadside ambush between Har Bracha and Itamar while returning home from work on 27 August 2001. Zagron was killed by a suicide bomber on 27 October 2002 in Ariel along with two other Israelis. Asheri, a high school student, was kidnapped by Palestinian Tanzim militants in June 2006 while on his way from Beitar Illit to Neveh Tzuf, northwest of Ramallah, and murdered while in captivity. His body was later found in an open field.

Rabbi Binyamin Herling (64), a Holocaust survivor, was killed near Itamar on 19 October 2000 when Fatah and Palestinian security forces opened fire on a group of men, women, and children. Arieh Arnaldo Leon Agranionic (48) was shot and killed at close range on 8 May 2001 while defending Itamar.

A number of infiltrations into Itamar have also resulted in deaths. In May 2002, a Palestinian shot and killed two students playing basketball outside of the Hitzim yeshiva high school. He then entered the yeshiva and shot three more teenagers, one of whom died from his wounds, before being shot by one of the teachers.

Less than a month later, two Palestinians broke into the home of the Shabo family and opened fire, killing Rachel Shabo (40) and three of her children, Neria (15), Zvika (12), and Avishai (5). Two other children, Asahel (10) and Avia (13), were shot and severely wounded. Yosef Twito (31), father of five, who served as commander of the neighborhood preparedness team, was also shot to death in the attack, as he approached the family's home to help. Another eight Israelis were injured when soldiers stormed the house to rescue trapped civilians. Ambulances carrying the wounded were delayed by roadblocks and pelted with stones. The Popular Front for the Liberation of Palestine claimed responsibility for the attack. Twitos successor, Shlomo Miller (50), was killed in August 2004 by a Palestinian identified as a member of the preventive security forces of the Palestinian Authority.

In July 2002, an armed Palestinian broke into the home of David (44) and Orna Mimran (40), stabbing both of them. He also stabbed the empty beds of their eight children, who were away visiting their grandparents. They fought back and survived the attack, and an army officer killed the attacker. David Mimran suffered sixteen stab wounds.

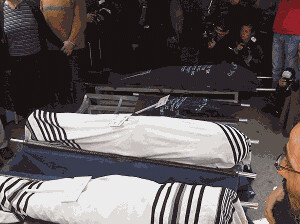
Funeral for killed members of Fogel family in Givat Shaul

In an attack in March 2011 five members of the Fogel family were stabbed to death in their sleep: Udi Fogel (36), Ruth Fogel (35), and their children Yoav (11), Elad (4), and Hadas (3 months). According to multiple sources, the infant was decapitated. The bodies were found by Udi and Ruth's twelve-year-old daughter, Tamar. Two young Palestinian men, Amjad Awad and Hakim Awad, from the village of Awarta were arrested in April and proudly confessed to the murder, reenacted it before the security officials, and expressed no remorse. They were both convicted of five counts of murder and sentenced to five consecutive life sentences. They were also convicted for weapons-related and other security offenses. The attack has been called a massacre by various reports. In February 2012, more than 1,000 members of the Likud party visited Itamar and planted 1,500 trees in memory of the victims of the Fogel family massacre as part of annual Tu Bishvat festivities throughout Israel. Palestinian newspapers spread the unsubstantiated claim that the massacres were carried out by a disgruntled Thai worker.

Dozens of women and children from Itamar protested in October 2011 when Palestinians from Awarta were allowed to harvest olives within their security zone, as they said they were not informed prior and relatives of the murderers of the Fogel family were among the harvesters. According to the Shomron Residents Committee, Palestinian harvesters allegedly taunted the surviving Fogel children, threw rocks at Itamar residents, yelling "We'll Fogel you" and other threats. Tamar Fogel joined the protestors. Gershon Mesika, head of the Shomron Regional Council, said that Hakim Awad had used the harvest a year prior to gather information in preparation for the attack, and Brigadier General (Res.) Rabbi Avichai Rontzki stated, "Six months after the murder, with the blood still boiling and the settlement still caring for its bleeding wounds, allowing any resident of Awarta where the murderers of the Fogel family and the Shabo family came from is outrageous lawlessness." According to the Itamar settlers, "In previous years, the yeshiva students had harvested the olives and transferred them to Awarta free of charge".

Violence against Israeli shepherds has also been reported. In April 2012, a skirmish took place between several Itamar settlers and Palestinians on Hill 777, a nearby outpost. Both sides reported injuries and stated that the other had initiated a confrontation. According to the Israeli account, a group of Palestinians threw rocks at them and beat them with clubs. They reported that two were injured, including Matan Fogel, the younger brother of Udi Fogel. The Palestinians stated that they were attacked first and that three were injured. This was the second incident to occur in the same week, after Palestinians began farming in Harish, a restricted area.

== 2012 lawsuit ==
In March 2012, Attorney Doron Nir Tzvi, legal advisor for the Committee of Samaria Residents, filed a complaint against Haaretz reporter Neri Livneh for describing the town as "especially aggressive" and claiming that "every two years a murderer comes out of there" in a television appearance. According to the suit, Livneh slandered two Itamar residents by calling them murderers. In November of the same year, the court ruled in Itamar's favor and ordered Livneh to pay 200,000 shekels (50,000 dollars) in addition to attorney and court costs. This ruling was reportedly reached after Livneh "failed to file a defense statement in time and had not requested an extension to do so".

== 2012–13 dispute among Itamar settlers ==
In late 2012, Avri Ran took over a hill, Mitzpeh Shloshet Hayamim, which fellow Itamar residents had planned to turn into a tourist site for its views, and then bulldozed a rockery in order to make building extensions to his farming business. Itamar residents and its outpost settlers on Hill777, themselves reportedly illegal squatters who had hitherto never expressed any criticisms when Ran took over Palestinian land, raised a complaint to the Samaria Regional Council to intervene and stop him, on the grounds that he has no title to that tract. Their letter of complaint remarked that,’ "We’re all full of admiration for Avri for his steps to conquer [land] in Samaria. But those exact same deeds are being committed today against his Jewish neighbors.' The hill is outside the boundaries of the Samaria Regional Council however, and, according to Haaretz, the Israeli Civil Administration has not applied the law to Itamar’s hilltops for a decade and a half."

== See also ==
- Itamar attack (2002)
- Itamar massacre
