= Giv'ot Olam =

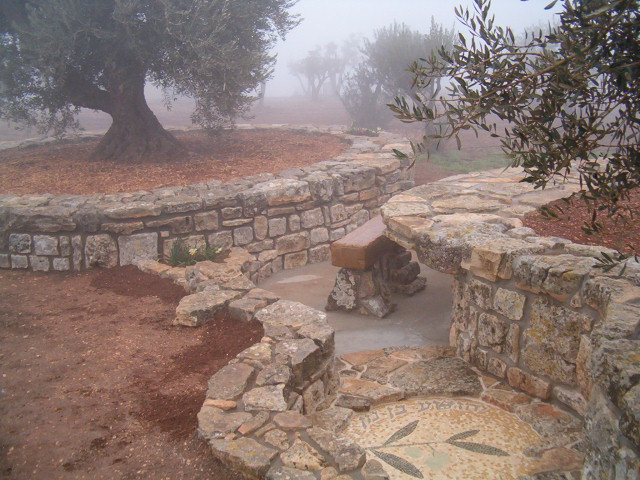

- Location within the Northern West Bank
- Coordinates: 32.1598081°N 35.352118°E
- Country: Palestine
- District: Judea and Samaria Area
- Council: Shomron
- Region: West Bank
- Founded: 1998
- Founder: Avri Ran

Giv'ot Olam (Hebrew: גבעות עולם, lit. 'Hills of Eternity') is an Israeli outpost in the northern West Bank. Located 4.5 kilometres south-east of Itamar, it falls under the jurisdiction of Shomron Regional Council.

The international community considers Israeli settlements in the West Bank illegal under international law, but the Israeli government disputes this.

== History ==
Giv'ot Olam was established in late 1998 by Avri Ran, a right-wing activist and organic farmer who raises free-range chickens and sells their eggs on the organic food market.

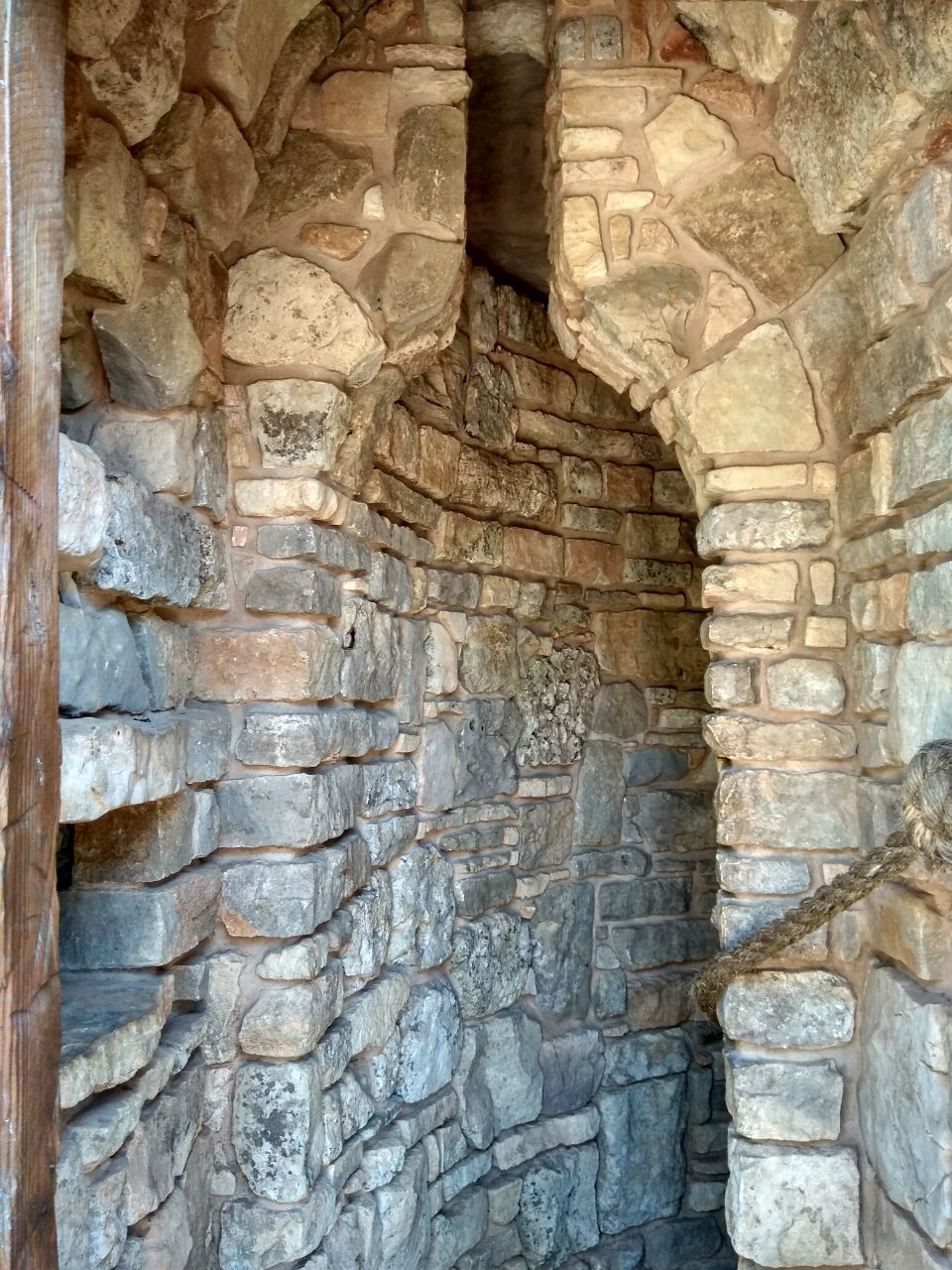
Wine cellar in Giv'ot Olam

The name derives from Moses' Biblical blessing for Joseph: "with the fruitfulness of the hills of eternity." (Deuteronomy 33:15)
