= Avichai Rontzki =

- אביחי רונצקי
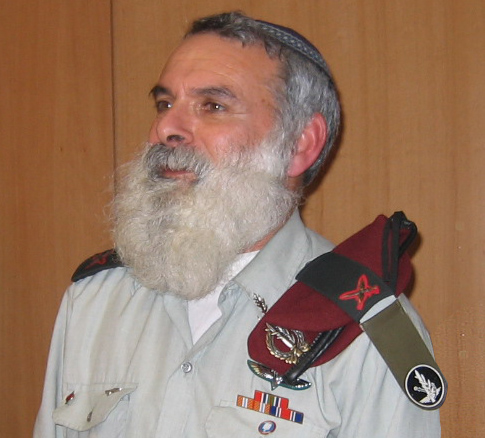
- Born: October 10, 1951; Haifa, Israel
- Died: April 1, 2018 (aged 66)
- Military career
- Allegiance: Israel
- Branch: Israel Defense Forces
- Service years: 1969–2010
- Rank: Brigadier General
- Unit: Military Rabbinate
- Commands: Commander of the Military Rabbinate
- Other work: Rosh Yeshiva of Itamar

Avichai Rontzki (Hebrew: אביחי רונצקי; October 10, 1951 – April 1, 2018) was an Israeli Chief Military Rabbi of the Israel Defense Forces. He served in the position from 2006 to 2010, with a rank of Brigadier General. His predecessor in that position was Rabbi Israel Weiss. Rontzki was also the rosh yeshiva of the Hesder Yeshiva in Itamar.

== Biography ==
Rontzki was born to a secular Jewish family, and studied at the Hebrew Reali School in Haifa. He became religious while serving in the army. In 1969, he began his military career in Shayetet 13, but did not complete the training course and transferred to the 35th Paratroopers Brigade. He completed the squad leader course and Officer Candidate School, and returned to the Paratroopers Brigade to serve as a platoon leader and as company Executive officer at the 890 "Efe" (Echis) paratroop battalion. Later on, he transferred to Sayeret Shaked, and served as a company commander in the Yom Kippur War. During this time, he began a process of repentance with his wife Ronit, who he had met in his unit. Rontzki studied at Machon Meir and Mercaz HaRav, and also was involved with instructing street kids in Jerusalem. In 1980, he established the Hesder Yeshiva in Elon Moreh. In 1984, he was part of the group that established the settlement Itamar near Nablus, and he also founded the Hesder yeshiva there.

Rontzki wrote a four-volume army halakhic guide, K'Hitzim B'Yad Gibor. In addition to his rosh yeshiva position, he continued to serve in the reserves, and rose in rank to the position of chief of staff of the Samaria Territorial Brigade (Hebrew: חטיבה מרחבית שומרון).

After being offered the position of Chief Military Rabbi, many advised him to decline, due to the Military Rabbinate collaboration with Israel's unilateral disengagement plan, of which the military played a primary part.

After assuming command of the Chief Rabbinate in 2006, Rontzki initiated a mini-revolution in the command. In addition to the traditional rabbinate activities of kitchen kosher certification and religious services for religious soldiers, Rontzki expanded the mandate to include a more active role in the army, including increasing the number of battalion rabbis.

"During the war, it became clear that there is a significant gap between the number of positions available to rabbis in various units and their actual manning by military rabbis."

In December 2014, after it became clear that the Knesset's coalition would dissolve, and new elections would be called, Rontzi announced he expected to run in the primaries for Bayit Yehudi's list.

On 1 April 2018, he died, after a struggle with colorectal cancer. He left behind his wife, six children, and grandchildren.

== Controversies ==
Rontzki expanded the "Jewish Awareness Department", which conducts educational activities in IDF combat units. He gave Torah classes in jails, and conducted a tour of Hebron for soldiers in Military Intelligence in which they met with Rabbi Dov Lior. An Israeli settler accused of assaulting and wounding Palestinians spent his house arrest in Rontzki's home. In a letter he sent to officers in the Military Rabbinate in October 2008, he wrote that, "There is a crucial need to connect [the] soldiers with their roots and Jewish values", and that IDF rabbis are supposed to be involved in inculcating Jewish values. He attempted to force the Israel Army Radio to stop broadcasting on Shabbat to come in line with the standard army order permitting only operational duty on the holy day.

During Operation Cast Lead, the army rabbinate under Rontzki's lead had a more significant presence on the field than traditional to the rabbinate. The rabbinate provided a text titled "Daily Torah studies for the soldier and the commander in Operation Cast Lead" to soldiers and officers, which was criticized as being overtly nationalist and political, to the point of racism, and encouraging violations of international law regarding the treatment of enemy civilians.

Rontzki stated that religious troops make better soldiers, and that those who show mercy towards the enemy in wartime will be damned for it.

Rontzki objects to women serving in combat units, and believes that it is impractical and harmful to the "combat array". He expressed doubt that women would want to serve the full service as men serve. In addition, he revealed that a female Religion Officer would join the Military Rabbinate for the first time to serve the needs of religious women soldiers. His attitude towards women soldiers has been criticised by several Knesset members, who demanded that Rontzki be dismissed from his post as IDF's chief rabbi.

The Israeli human rights organization Yesh Din called on Defense Minister Ehud Barak to immediately remove Rontzki from his post as chief military rabbi, due to his conduct during Operation Cast Lead. MK Ophir Pines-Paz asked Barak to order an immediate investigation into the activities of the military rabbinate. Pines-Paz wrote that "The article gives cause for concern", and that "The [military] rabbinate is overstepping its authority, which is solely to provide religious services, and is acting in an aggressive manner in order to cause Israel Defense Forces soldiers to become religiously observant. This activity undermines religious-secular relations in the IDF and leads the army into dealing with areas beyond its scope. It uses the IDF to advance religious and political ideas. The [military] rabbinate is bringing religion in through the back door, in a dangerous manner, and harming the IDF's ability to fulfill its mission".

In December 2009, it was reported that Defense Minister of Israel Ehud Barak and Chief of General Staff Gabi Ashkenazi will not extend Rontzki's service past the summer of 2010. In January 2010, Rafi Peretz was appointed to succeed Rontzki as chief military rabbi in summer 2010.

Referring to the Gilad Shalit prisoner exchange, Rontzki said in an interview to Arutz Sheva in October 2011 that Israeli soldiers should no longer arrest convicted terrorists, but instead "kill them in their beds".
