= Anna Baltzer =

American human rights activist

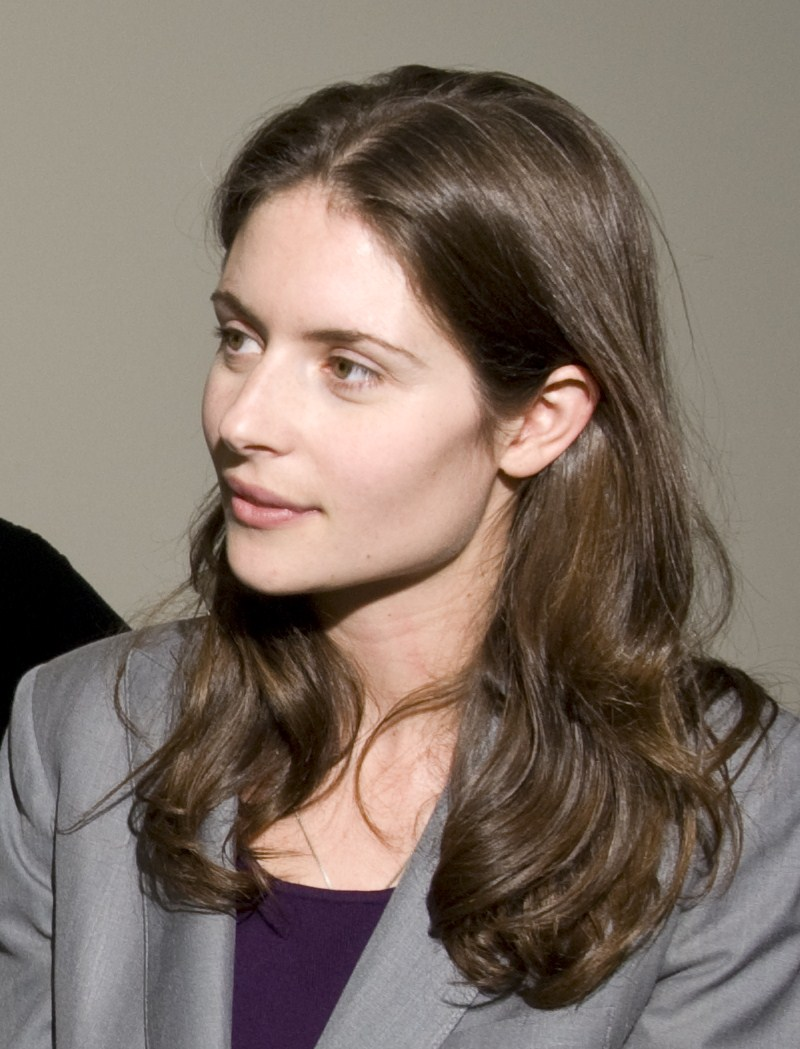
- Baltzer at Columbia University, New York in 2008
- Born: 1979 (age 46–47)
- Education: Columbia University
- Occupation: Public speaker
- Known for: pro-Palestinian activism
- Website: www.annainthemiddleeast.com

Anna Baltzer (born 1979) is an American public speaker, author and activist for Palestinian human rights.

== Overview ==
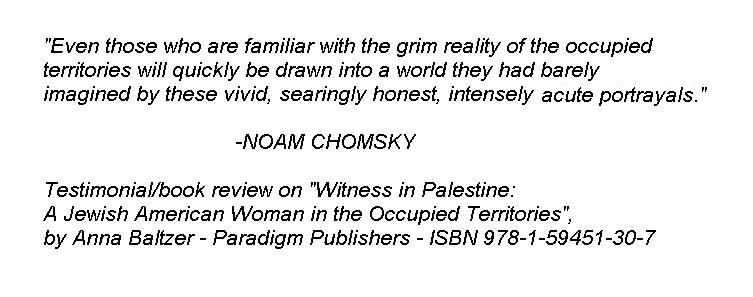
Noam Chomsky's review of Baltzer's book statement

After graduating from Columbia, Baltzer traveled to the Middle East in 2003 on a Fulbright grant to teach English in Ankara, Turkey. Since then, she has traveled to the West Bank as a volunteer for the International Women's Peace Service to document human rights abuses and support nonviolent resistance. Her publications have documented Palestinian living conditions while on assignment in the West Bank for the International Women's Peace Service.

Since the summer of 2005, she has been touring around the United States and abroad with a presentation and has written a book (Witness in Palestine) describing her experiences, observations, and photographs from eight months of documenting human rights violations in the West Bank. Noam Chomsky's review of Baltzer's book states, "Even those who are familiar with the grim reality of the occupied territories will quickly be drawn into a world they had barely imagined by these vivid, searingly honest, intensely acute portrayals", while Tanya Reinhart author of "Roadmap to Nowhere" call it "Moving and vivid." Mark Chmiel, teacher at St. Louis University and Webster University and author of "Elie Wiesel and the Politics of Moral Leadership", has also written about Baltzer's book.

On October 28, 2009, Baltzer was a guest on The Daily Show with Jon Stewart, alongside Mustafa Barghouti.

== Political activism ==
Baltzer's activism centers around nonviolent protests, as well as providing documented information to those interested in the Israeli–Palestinian conflict for the purpose of education and encouraging dialogue towards taking action on the issues. She claims that critical information doesn't show up in the United States mainstream media. According to Balzter's own account, when she first went to Israel on a free birthright trip in January 2000, she saw "a beautiful picture of Israel" but nothing of what was happening to Palestinians. "A Jewish student-life coordinator at Hillel, called the SJP event very well organized and well attended. It seemed very non-threatening and very non-violent. (Speaker) Baltzer made an extra special point that just because she was anti-Israeli policy, it doesn’t mean she is anti-Jewish."

== Publications ==
Baltzer has over 29 published articles online, and additionally has both letters and articles published in: The Wall Street Journal, The Exponent, If Americans Knew, United Civilians for Peace (Melbourne, Australia), Information Clearing House, Northeast Mississippi Daily Journal, Des Moines Register, Leaf Chronicle, Washington Times,

In April 2007, Baltzer wrote a piece called Whose Responsibility?. In this article she writes that while internationally people place blame on the Palestinian Authority for the flooding that caused five people to drown to death and left many more injured and missing, they are only part of the problem. She stated that per the Palestinian Center for Human Rights, the reason the cesspool collapsed was because of project delays by the Israel Defense Forces. Her article also states that while Israel had said they would be withdrawing from Gaza, they have not and gives several examples as to why she thinks that Gaza is under the control of Israel and imprisoned by them. Additionally, in May 2007, she wrote an article titled "Dedicated and resilient women on both sides of the Green Line". In this article she writes about the struggles that people who live in Palestine face. One of the examples that she presents is that of her friend Fatima Khaldi. She talks about Fatima's hardships growing up with a physical handicap and without a father, and tells us how despite her incredibly difficult life she became an activist who founded Women for Life (WFL), and is empowering other women like her. In an article published in September 2008, Baltzer wrote an article titled "Where are the American voices"?. In this publication, she states that America has openly condemned illegal settlements, and yet they continue to provide Israel with 10 million dollars a day. She states that Israel gives money to their citizens if they live in settlements on Palestinian land, and that money comes from American tax dollars.

== Recognition ==
Baltzer, was given the Arab-American Anti-Discrimination Committee's Annual Rachel Corrie Peace & Justice Award. In addition, she was given a Certificate of Commendation from the Governor of Wisconsin in 2009.

In 2011, she received the Inspiration for Hope Award from the American Friends Service Committee, along with author and Pulitzer Prize Winner Alice Walker and Palestinian-American student activist Sami Kishawi.
