= Israeli settlement =

Israeli civilian communities in territories occupied by Israel since 1967

West Bank settlements (2025)

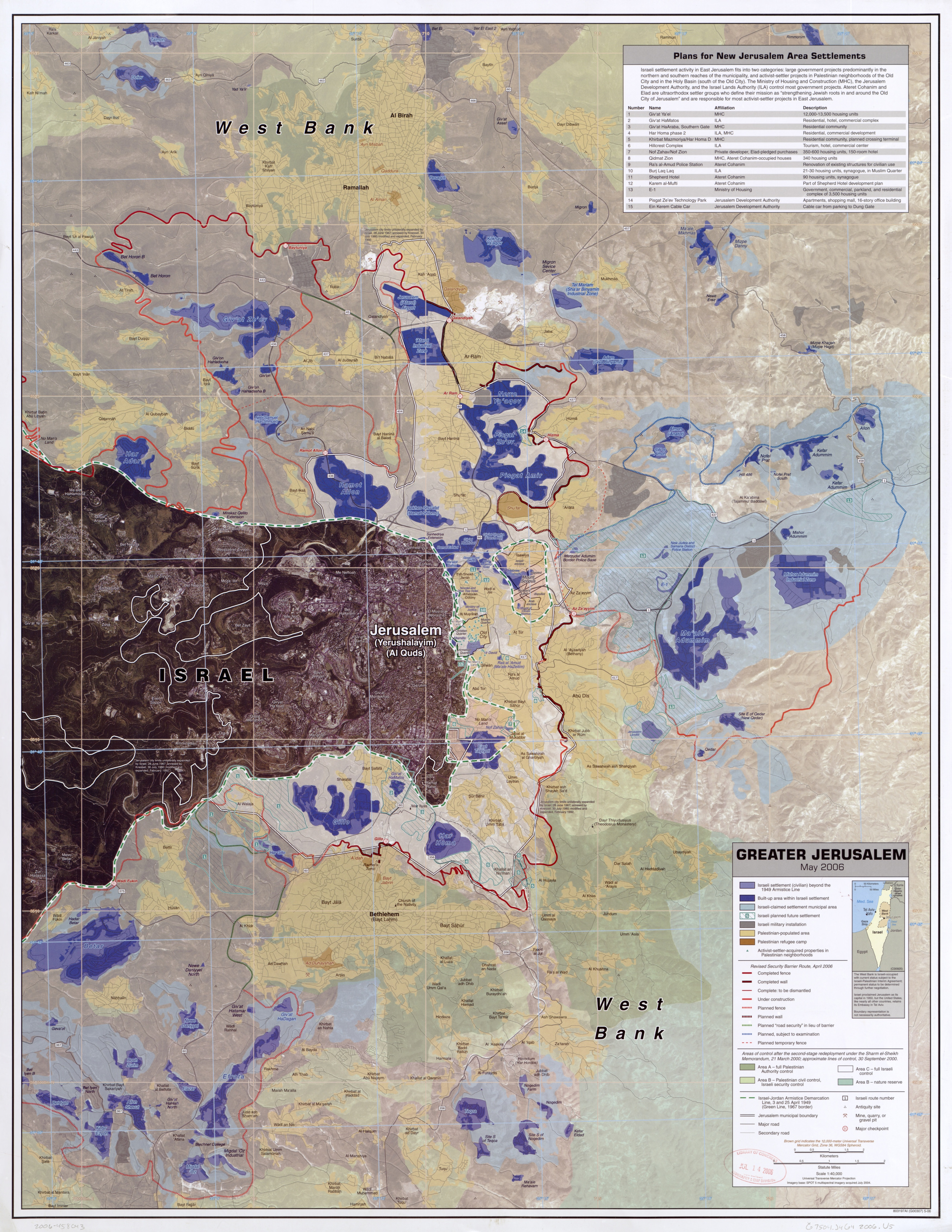
East Jerusalem settlements (2006)

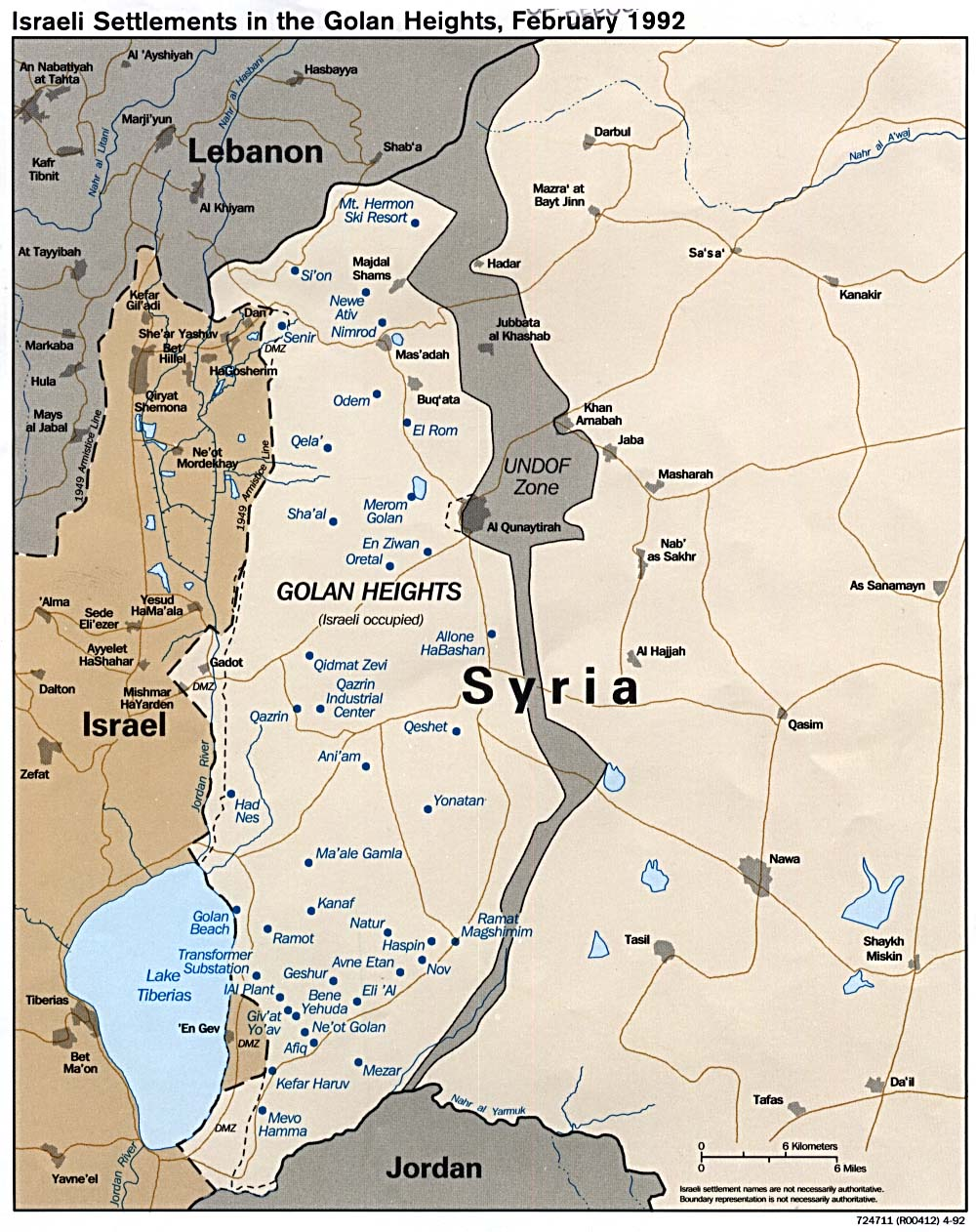
Golan Heights settlements (1992)

Gaza Strip settlements (1993), dismantled since the 2005 disengagement

Israeli settlements, also called Israeli colonies, are the civilian communities built by Israel throughout the Israeli-occupied territories. They are populated by Israeli citizens, almost exclusively of Jewish identity or ethnicity, and have been constructed on lands that Israel has militarily occupied since the Six-Day War in 1967. The international community considers Israeli settlements to be illegal under international law, but Israel disputes this. In 2024, the International Court of Justice (ICJ) found in an advisory opinion that Israel's occupation was illegal and ruled that Israel had "an obligation to cease immediately all new settlement activities and to evacuate all settlers" from the occupied territories. The population of the settlements increased rapidly over the last 35 years. The expansion of settlements often involves the confiscation of Palestinian land and resources, leading to displacement of Palestinian communities and creating a source of tension and conflict. Settlements are often protected by the Israeli military and are frequently flashpoints for violence against Palestinians. Furthermore, the presence of settlements and Jewish-only bypass roads creates a fragmented Palestinian territory, seriously hindering economic development and freedom of movement for Palestinians.

As of April 2025, Israeli settlements exist in the West Bank (including East Jerusalem), which is claimed by the Palestine Liberation Organization (PLO) as the sovereign territory of the State of Palestine, and in the Golan Heights, which is internationally recognized as a part of the sovereign territory of Syria. (Note: In 2019, the United States became the only state to recognize the Golan Heights as Israeli sovereign territory, while the rest of the international community continues to consider the territory Syrian held under Israeli military occupation.) Through the Jerusalem Law and the Golan Heights Law, Israel effectively annexed both territories, though the international community has rejected any change to their status as occupied territory. Although Israel's West Bank settlements have been built on territory administered under military rule rather than civil law, Israeli civil law is "pipelined" into the settlements, such that Israeli citizens living there are treated similarly to those living in Israel. Many consider it to be a major obstacle to the Israeli–Palestinian peace process. In Legal Consequences of the Construction of a Wall in the Occupied Palestinian Territory (2004), the ICJ found that Israel's settlements and the then-nascent Israeli West Bank barrier were both in violation of international law; part of the latter has been constructed within the West Bank, as opposed to being entirely on Israel's side of the Green Line.

As of January 2023, there are 144 Israeli settlements in the West Bank, including 12 in East Jerusalem; the Israeli government administers the West Bank as the Judea and Samaria Area, which does not include East Jerusalem. In addition to the settlements, the West Bank is also hosting at least 196 Israeli outposts, which are settlements that have not been authorized by the Israeli government. In total, over 450,000 Israeli settlers reside in the West Bank, excluding East Jerusalem, with an additional 220,000 Israeli settlers residing in East Jerusalem. Additionally, over 25,000 Israeli settlers live in Syria's Golan Heights. Between 1967 and 1982, there were 18 settlements established in the Israeli-occupied Sinai Peninsula of Egypt, though these were dismantled by Israel after the Egypt–Israel peace treaty of 1979. Additionally, as part of the Israeli disengagement from the Gaza Strip in 2005, Israel dismantled all 21 settlements in the Gaza Strip and four settlements in the West Bank.

Per the Fourth Geneva Convention, the transfer by an occupying power of its civilian population into the territory it is occupying constitutes a war crime, although Israel disputes that this statute applies to the West Bank. On 20 December 2019, the International Criminal Court announced the opening of an investigation of war crimes in the Palestinian territories. The presence and ongoing expansion of existing settlements by Israel and the construction of outposts is frequently criticized as an obstacle to peace by the PLO, and by a number of third parties, such as the Organization of Islamic Cooperation, the United Nations (UN), Russia, the United Kingdom, France, and the European Union. The UN has repeatedly upheld the view that Israel's construction of settlements in the occupied territories constitutes a violation of the Fourth Geneva Convention. For decades, the United States also designated Israeli settlements as illegal, but the first Trump administration reversed this long-standing policy in November 2019, declaring that "the establishment of Israeli civilian settlements in the West Bank is not per se inconsistent with international law"; this new policy, in turn, was reversed to the original by the Biden administration in February 2024, once again classifying Israeli settlement expansion as "inconsistent with international law" and matching the official positions of the other three members of the Middle East Quartet.

== Name and characterization ==
Certain observers and Palestinians occasionally use the term "Israeli colonies" as a substitute for the term "settlements". Settlements range in character from farming communities and frontier villages to urban suburbs and neighborhoods. The four largest settlements, Modi'in Illit, Ma'ale Adumim, Beitar Illit and Ariel, have achieved city status. Ariel has 18,000 residents, while the rest have around 37,000 to 55,500 each.

== Housing costs and state subventions ==
Settlement has an economic dimension, much of it driven by the significantly lower costs of housing for Israeli citizens living in Israeli settlements compared to the cost of housing and living in Israel proper. Government spending per citizen in the settlements is double that spent per Israeli citizen in Tel Aviv and Jerusalem, while government spending for settlers in isolated Israeli settlements is three times the Israeli national average. Most of the spending goes to the security of the Israeli citizens living there.

== Number of settlements and inhabitants ==
As of January 2023, there are 144 Israeli settlements in the West Bank, including 12 in East Jerusalem. In addition, there are at least 196 Israeli illegal outposts (not sanctioned by the Israeli government) in the West Bank. In total, over 529,000 Israeli settlers live in the West Bank excluding East Jerusalem, with an additional 246,000 Jewish settlers residing in East Jerusalem.

Additionally, over 20,000 Israeli citizens live in settlements in the Golan Heights.

== History ==
=== Occupied territories ===
Following the 1967 Six-Day War, Israel occupied a number of territories. It took over the remainder of the Palestinian Mandate territories of the West Bank including East Jerusalem, from Jordan which had controlled the territories since the 1948 Arab-Israeli war, and the Gaza Strip from Egypt, which had held Gaza under occupation since 1949. From Egypt, it also captured the Sinai Peninsula and from Syria it captured most of the Golan Heights, which since 1981 has been administered under the Golan Heights Law.

=== Settlement policy ===
As early as September 1967, Israeli settlement policy was progressively encouraged by the Labor government of Levi Eshkol. The basis for Israeli settlement in the West Bank became the Allon Plan, named after its inventor Yigal Allon. It implied Israeli annexation of major parts of the Israeli-occupied territories, especially East Jerusalem, Gush Etzion and the Jordan Valley. The settlement policy of the government of Yitzhak Rabin was also derived from the Allon Plan.

The first settlement was Kfar Etzion, in the southern West Bank, although that location was outside the Allon Plan. Many settlements began as Nahal settlements. They were established as military outposts and later expanded and populated with civilian inhabitants. According to a secret document dating to 1970, obtained by Haaretz, the settlement of Kiryat Arba was established by confiscating land by military order and falsely representing the project as being strictly for military use while in reality, Kiryat Arba was planned for settler use. The method of confiscating land by military order for establishing civilian settlements was an open secret in Israel throughout the 1970s, but publication of the information was suppressed by the military censor.

In the 1970s, Israel's methods for seizing Palestinian land to establish settlements included requisitioning for ostensibly military purposes and spraying of land with poison.

The Likud government of Menahem Begin, from 1977, was more supportive to settlement in other parts of the West Bank, by organizations like Gush Emunim and the Jewish Agency/World Zionist Organization, and intensified the settlement activities. In a government statement, Likud declared that the entire historic Land of Israel is the inalienable heritage of the Jewish people and that no part of the West Bank should be handed over to foreign rule. Ariel Sharon declared in the same year (1977) that there was a plan to settle 2 million Jews in the West Bank by 2000. The government abrogated the prohibition from purchasing occupied land by Israelis; the "Drobles Plan", a plan for large-scale settlement in the West Bank meant to prevent a Palestinian state under the pretext of security became the framework for its policy. (Note: Citations from the Drobles Plan (October 1978): "Settlement throughout the entire Land of Israel is for security and by right. A strip of settlements at strategic sites enhances both internal and external security alike, as well as making concrete and realizing our right to Eretz Israel." "The disposition of the settlements must be carried out not only around the settlements of the minorities, but also in between them." [Note: "minorities" refers to the Arab population in Israel and the Palestinian territories. The West Bank had some 98% Arabs in 1978.] "New settlements will be established only on State-owned land, and not on private Arab-owned land which is duly registered. We should ensure that there is no need for the expropriation of private plots from the members of the minorities." "As is known, it is the task of the land settlement department to initiate, plan and implement the settlement enterprise according to the decisions of the Government and of the joint Government-World Zionist Organization Committee for Settlement." "This will enable us to bring about the dispersion … to the presently empty areas of J&S.") The "Drobles Plan" from the World Zionist Organization, dated October 1978 and named "Master Plan for the Development of Settlements in Judea and Samaria, 1979–1983", was written by the Jewish Agency director and former Knesset member Matityahu Drobles. In January 1981, the government adopted a follow-up plan from Drobles, dated September 1980 and named "The current state of the settlements in Judea and Samaria", with more details about settlement strategy and policy. (Note: Citations from the Matityahu Drobles follow-up plan (September 1980): THE SETTLEMENT STRATEGY IN JUDEA AND SAMARIA "In light of the current negotiations on the future of Judea and Samaria, it will now become necessary for us to conduct a race against time. During this period, everything will be mainly determined by the facts we establish in these territories and less by any other considerations. This is therefore the best time for launching an extensive and comprehensive settlement momentum, particularly on the Judea and Samaria hilltops which are not easily passable by nature and which preside over the Jordan Valley on the cast and over the Coastal Plain on the west." "It is therefore significant to stress today, mainly by means of actions, that the autonomy does not and will not apply to the territories but only to the Arab population thereof. This should mainly find expression by establishing facts on the ground. Therefore, the state-owned lands and the uncultivated barren lands in Judea and Samaria ought to be seized right away, with the purpose of settling the areas between and around the centers occupied by the minorities so as to reduce to the minimum the danger of an additional Arab state being established in these territories. Being cut off by Jewish settlements the minority population will find it difficult to form a territorial and political continuity." "There mustn't be even the shadow of a doubt about our intention to keep the territories of Judea and Samaria for good. Otherwise, the minority population may get into a state of growing disquiet which will eventually result in recurrent efforts to establish an additional Arab state in these territories. The best and most effective way of removing every shadow of a doubt about our intention to hold on to Judea and Samaria forever is by speeding up the settlement momentum in these territories." SETTLEMENT POLICY IN JUDEA AND SAMARIA "Thus, it is necessary to establish additional settlements near every existing settlement in Judea and Samaria, so as to create settlement clusters in homogenous settlement regions ..." "Over the next 5 years it is necessary to establish 12–15 rural and urban settlements per annum in Judea and Samaria, so that in five years from now the number of settlements will grow by 60–75 and the Jewish population thereof will amount to between 120,000 and 150,000 people.")

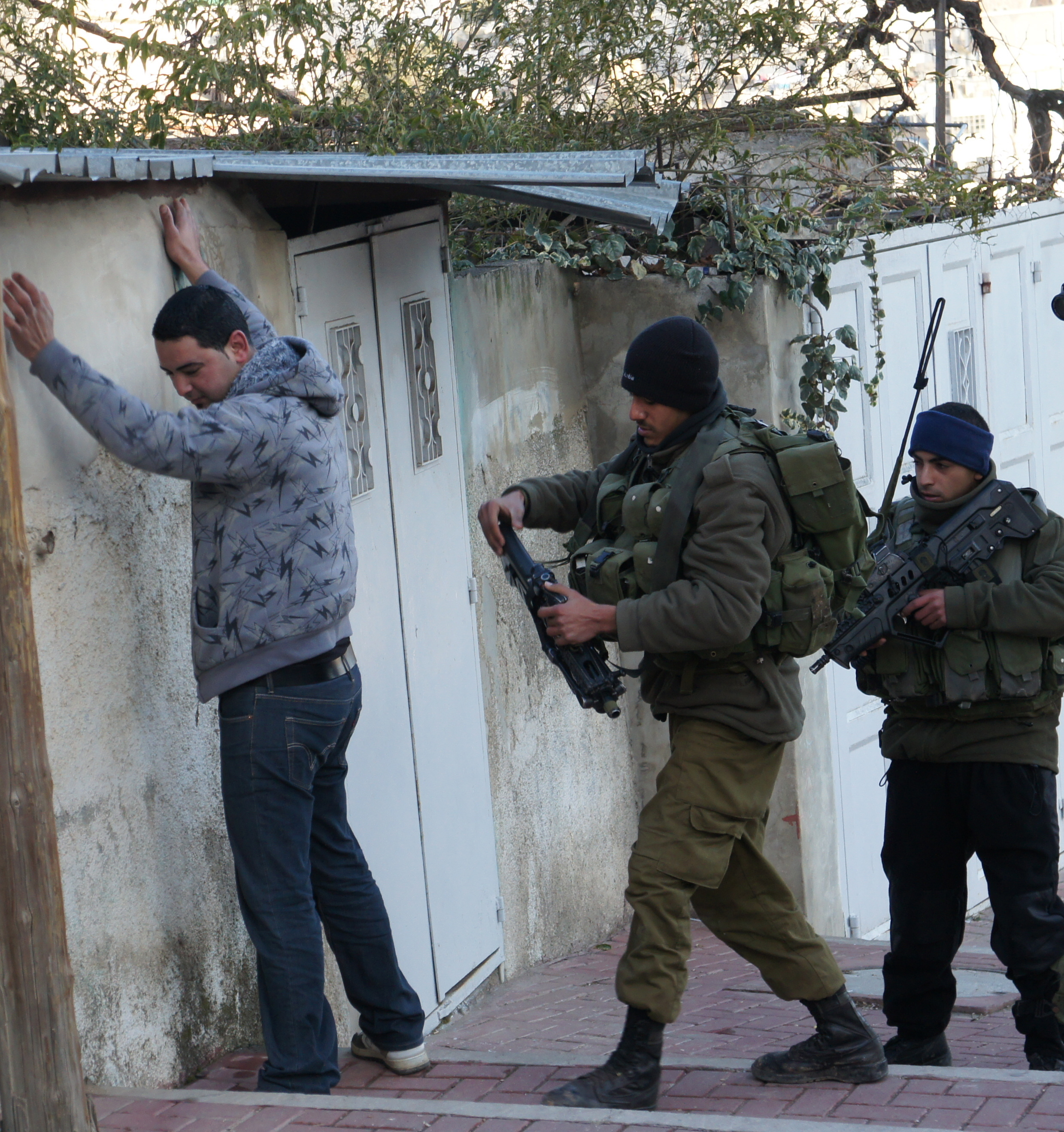
Israeli soldiers searching a Palestinian in Tel Rumeida, 2012

Since 1967, government-funded settlement projects in the West Bank are implemented by the "Settlement Division" of the World Zionist Organization. Though formally a non-governmental organization, it is funded by the Israeli government and leases lands from the Civil Administration to settle in the West Bank. It is authorized to create settlements in the West Bank on lands licensed to it by the Civil Administration. Traditionally, the Settlement Division has been under the responsibility of the Agriculture Ministry. Since the Oslo Accords, it was always housed within the Prime Minister's Office (PMO). In 2007, it was moved back to the Agriculture Ministry. In 2009, the Netanyahu Government decided to subject all settlement activities to additional approval of the Prime Minister and the Defense Minister. In 2011, Netanyahu sought to move the Settlement Division again under the direct control of (his own) PMO, and to curtail Defense Minister Ehud Barak's authority.

At the presentation of the Oslo II Accord on 5 October 1995 in the Knesset, PM Yitzhak Rabin expounded the Israeli settlement policy in connection with the permanent solution to the conflict. Israel wanted "a Palestinian entity, less than a state, which will be a home to most of the Palestinian residents living in the Gaza Strip and the West Bank". It wanted to keep settlements beyond the Green Line including Ma'ale Adumim and Givat Ze'ev in East Jerusalem. Blocs of settlements should be established in the West Bank. Rabin promised not to return to the 4 June 1967 lines.

In June 1997, the Likud government of Benjamin Netanyahu presented its "Allon Plus Plan". This plan holds the retention of some 60% of the West Bank, including the "Greater Jerusalem" area with the settlements Gush Etzion and Ma'aleh Adumim, other large concentrations of settlements in the West Bank, the entire Jordan Valley, a "security area", and a network of Israeli-only bypass roads.

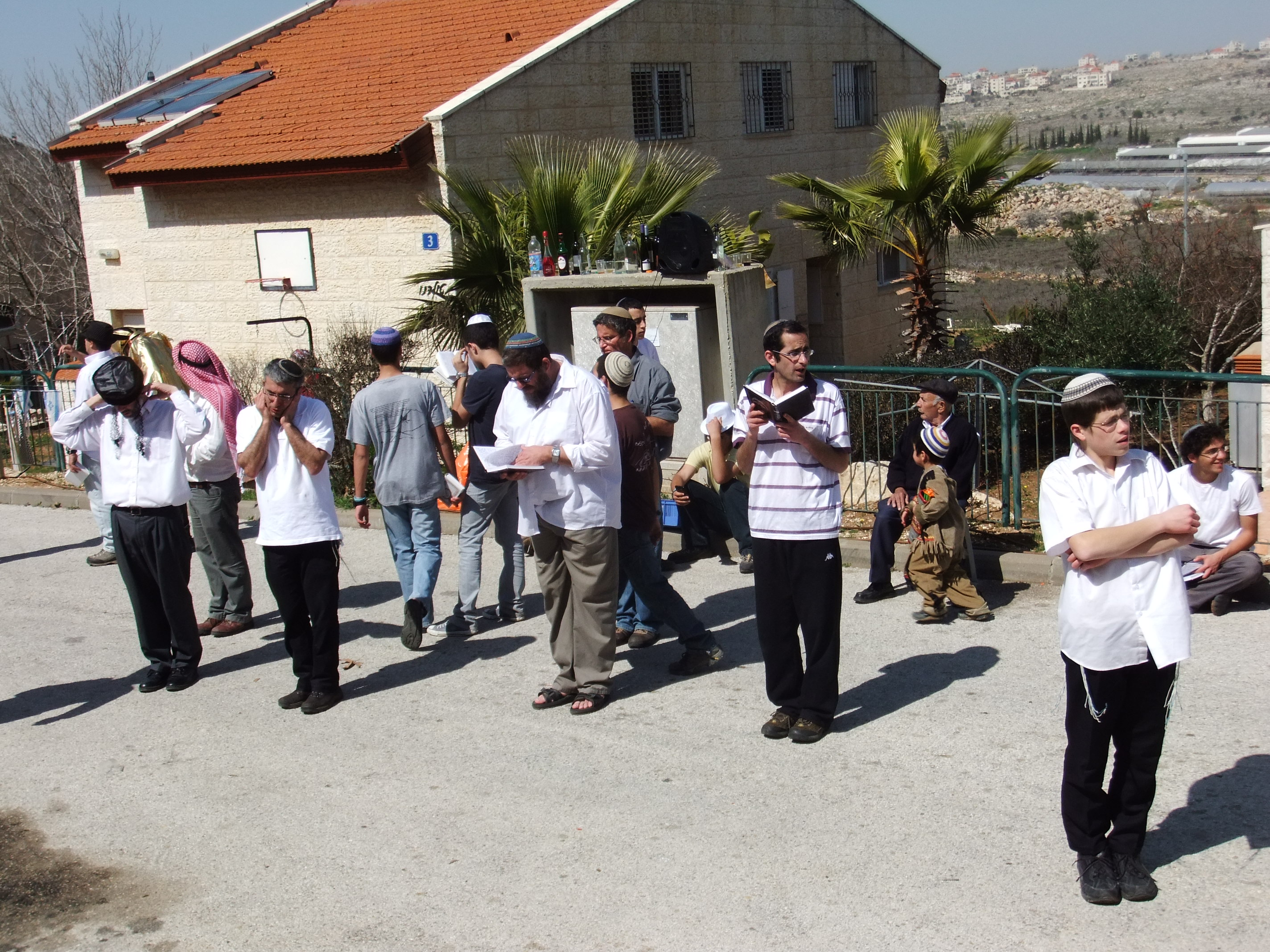
Israeli settlers in the Ofra settlement, Israeli-occupied West Bank, 2012

In the Road map for peace of 2002, which was never implemented, the establishment of a Palestinian state was acknowledged. Outposts would be dismantled. However, many new outposts appeared instead, few were removed. Israel's settlement policy remained unchanged. Settlements in East Jerusalem and remaining West Bank were expanded.

While according to official Israeli policy no new settlements were built, at least some hundred unauthorized outposts were established since 2002 with state funding in the 60% of the West Bank that was not under Palestinian administrative control and the population growth of settlers did not diminish.

In 2005, all 21 settlements in the Gaza Strip and four in the northern West Bank were forcibly evacuated as part of Israeli disengagement from the Gaza Strip, known to some in Israel as "the Expulsion". Nevertheless, the total settler population continued to rise.

After the failure of the Roadmap, several new plans emerged to settle in major parts of the West Bank. In 2011, Haaretz revealed the Civil Administration's "Blue Line"-plan, written in January 2011, which aims to increase Israeli "state-ownership" of West Bank land ("state lands") and settlement in strategic areas like the Jordan Valley and the northern Dead Sea area. In March 2012, it was revealed that the Civil Administration over the years covertly allotted 10% of the West Bank for further settlement. Provisional names for future new settlements or settlement expansions were already assigned. The plan includes many Palestinian built-up sites in the Areas A and B.

=== Settlements in the Gaza Strip ===
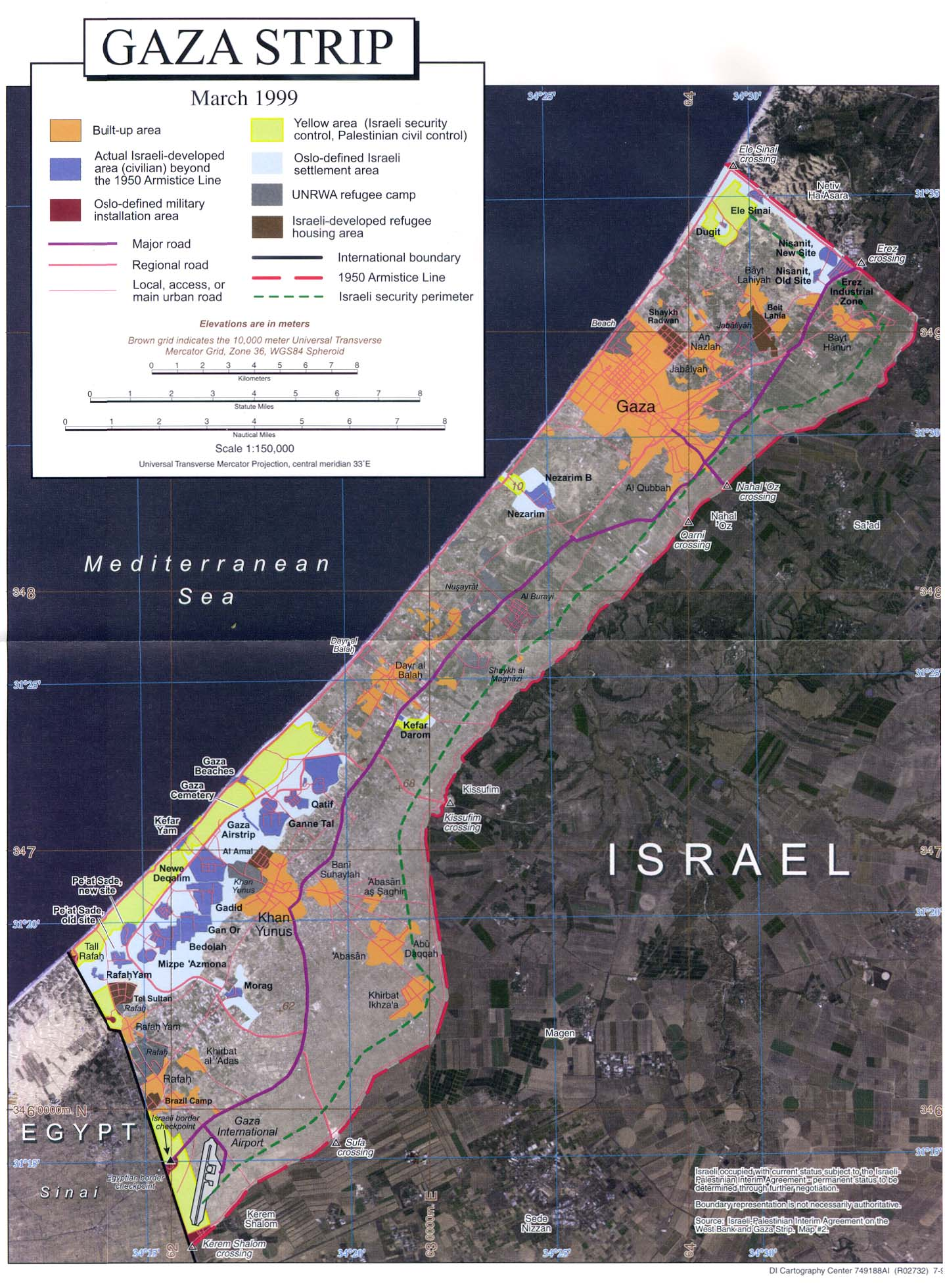
Settlement area in the Gaza Strip (March 1999)

Land in the Gaza Strip available to its Palestinian inhabitants has historically been limited as a result of Israeli land confiscation and the establishment of settlements. Settlement growth in the Gaza Strip before 1977 was limited, as the Israeli labor party's policy of containment preferred the establishment of a collection of settlements along the border of the Strip. At this point, 6 settlements in the Strip existed, Kfar Darom, Netzarim, Morag, Eretz, Katif, and Netzer Hazani. With the Likud party's revisionist Zionist policies entering with Begin's government, the scale of settlement expansion increased, although the basic policies relating to the settlements did not change. By 1978, 13 settlements had been built as part of a buffer zone along Gaza's southern border in Rafah.

The discussions at Camp David that year surrounding the idea of potential future Palestinian autonomy would trigger an increase in settlement expansion in the Gaza Strip, following the Israeli policy of establishing "facts on the ground". Political economist Sara Roy described this as a policy intended to make the establishment of an independent Palestinian state more difficult. The locations and size of these new settlements would contribute to geographically isolating Palestinian communities from each other.

In the seven years between 1978 and 1985, 11,500 acres of land were confiscated by the Israeli government for the establishment of settlements. By 1991, the settler population in Gaza would reach 3,500 and 4,000 by 1993, or less than 1% of Gaza's population. The land available for use by the Jewish settler community exceeded 25% of the total land in Gaza. The ratio of dunams to people was 23 for Jewish settlers, and 0.27 for Palestinians. Comparing the available built-up area available to each of the two groups in 1993, the ratio is 115 people per square mile for Jewish settlers and over 9,000 people per square mile for Palestinians. Sara Roy estimates the increase in Palestinian population density in Gaza due to Israeli policies alone to be an increase of almost 2,000 people per square mile in 1993.

All the settlements were surrounded by electric fences or barbed wire.

While the settlements maintained an isolated economic system, they affected the Gazan economy via land confiscation, the disproportionate consumption of local resources such as water, by overwhelmingly denying work opportunities and through the large disparities in funding (both private and governmental) for economic development.

== Geography and municipal status ==
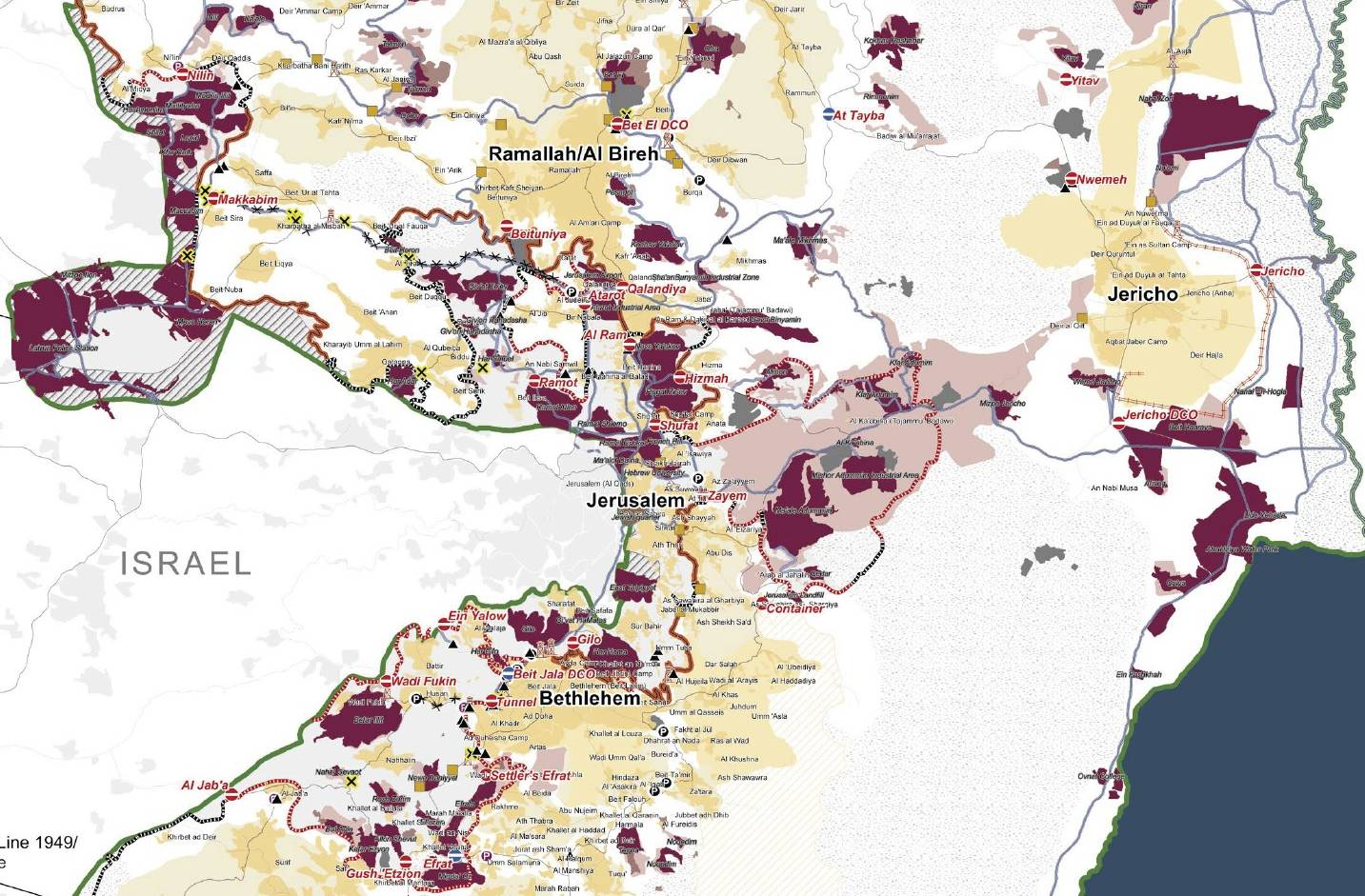
Upper left: Modiin bloc / Upper middle: Mountain ridge settlements outside barrier / Right: Jordan Valley; L above center: Latrun salient / Center: Jerusalem envelope, Ma'ale Adumim at right / Right: Jordan Valley; Lower L of center: Etzion bloc / Lower center: Judean Desert / Lower right: Dead Sea

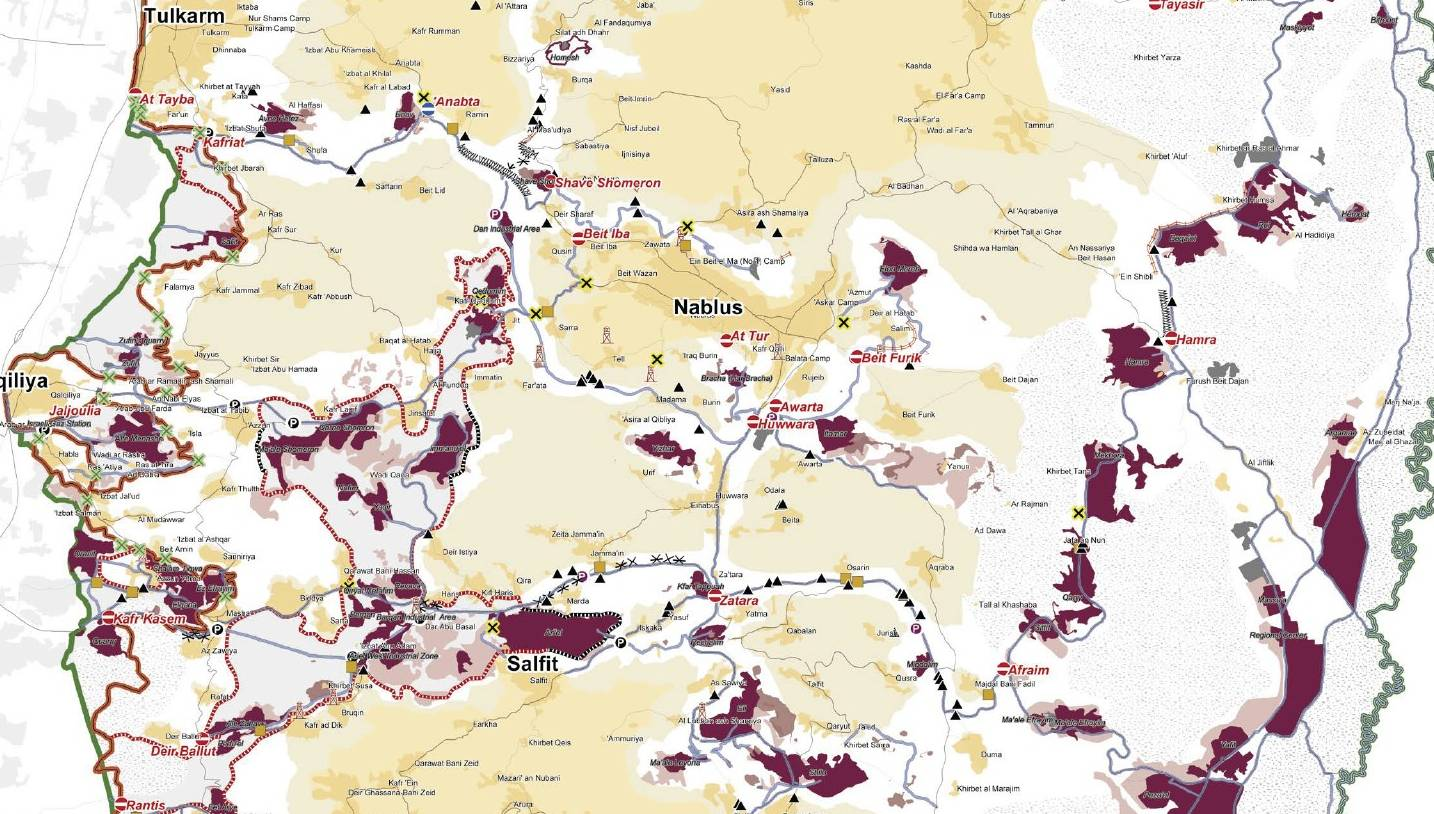
Upper L: 3 are outside barrier / Top L of center: part of Israel's unilateral disengagement / Whole right: Jordan Valley; L: W. Samaria bloc to Kedumim / Center: hills around Nablus/Shechem / Whole right: Jordan Valley; Lower L: W. Samaria bloc to Ariel / Lower middle: E. Trans-Samaria Hwy outside barrier / Whole right: Jordan Valley

Some settlements are self-contained cities with a stable population in the tens of thousands, infrastructure, and all other features of permanence. Examples are Beitar Illit (a city of close to 45,000 residents), Ma'ale Adumim, Modi'in Illit, and Ariel (almost 20,000 residents). Some are towns with a local council status with populations of 2,000–20,0000, such as Alfei Menashe, Eli, Elkana, Efrat and Kiryat Arba. There are also clusters of villages governed by a local elected committee and regional councils that are responsible for municipal services. Examples are Kfar Adumim, Neve Daniel, Kfar Tapuach and Ateret. Kibbutzim and moshavim in the territories include Argaman, Gilgal, Na'aran and Yitav. Jewish neighborhoods have been built on the outskirts of Arab neighborhoods, for example in Hebron. In Jerusalem, there are urban neighborhoods where Jews and Arabs live together: the Muslim Quarter, Silwan, Abu Tor, Sheikh Jarrah and Shimon HaTzadik.

Under the Oslo Accords, the West Bank was divided into three separate parts designated as Area A, Area B and Area C. Leaving aside the position of East Jerusalem, all of the settlements are in Area C which comprises about 60% of the West Bank.

== Types of settlement ==
- Cities/towns: Ariel, Betar Illit, Modi'in Illit and Ma'ale Adumim.
- Urban suburbs, such as Har Gilo.
- Block settlements, such as Gush Etzion and settlements in the Nablus area.
- Frontier villages, such as those along the Jordan River.
- Outposts, small settlements, some authorized and some unauthorized, often on hilltops. The Sasson Report, commissioned by Ariel Sharon's administration, found that several government ministries had cooperated to establish illegal outposts, spending millions of dollars on infrastructure.

== Resettlement of former Jewish communities ==
Some settlements were established on sites where Jewish communities had existed during the British Mandate of Palestine or even since the First Aliyah or ancient times.

- Golan Heights – Bnei Yehuda, founded in 1890, abandoned because of Arab attacks in 1920, rebuilt near the original site in 1972.
- Jerusalem – Jewish presence alongside other peoples since biblical times, various surrounding communities and neighborhoods, including Kfar Shiloah, also known as Silwan—settled by Yemenite Jews in 1884, Jewish residents evacuated in 1938, a few Jewish families move into reclaimed homes in 2004. Other communities: Shimon HaTzadik, Neve Yaakov and Atarot which in post-1967 was rebuilt as an industrial zone.
- Gush Etzion – four communities, established between 1927 and 1947, destroyed 1948, reestablished beginning 1967.
- Hebron – Jewish presence since biblical times, forced out in the wake of the 1929 Hebron massacre, some families returned in 1931 but were evacuated by the British, a few buildings resettled since 1967.
- Dead Sea, northern area – Kalia and Beit HaArava – the former was built in 1934 as a kibbutz for potash mining. The latter was built in 1943 as an agricultural community. Both were abandoned in 1948, and subsequently destroyed by Jordanian forces, and resettled after the Six-Day War.
- Gaza City had a Jewish community for many centuries that was evacuated following riots in 1929. After the Six-Day War, Jewish communities were not built in Gaza City, but in Gush Katif in the southwestern part of the Gaza Strip, f.e. Kfar Darom – established in 1946, evacuated in 1948 after an Egyptian attack, resettled in 1970, evacuated in 2005 as part of the withdrawal from the Gaza Strip.

== Demographics ==
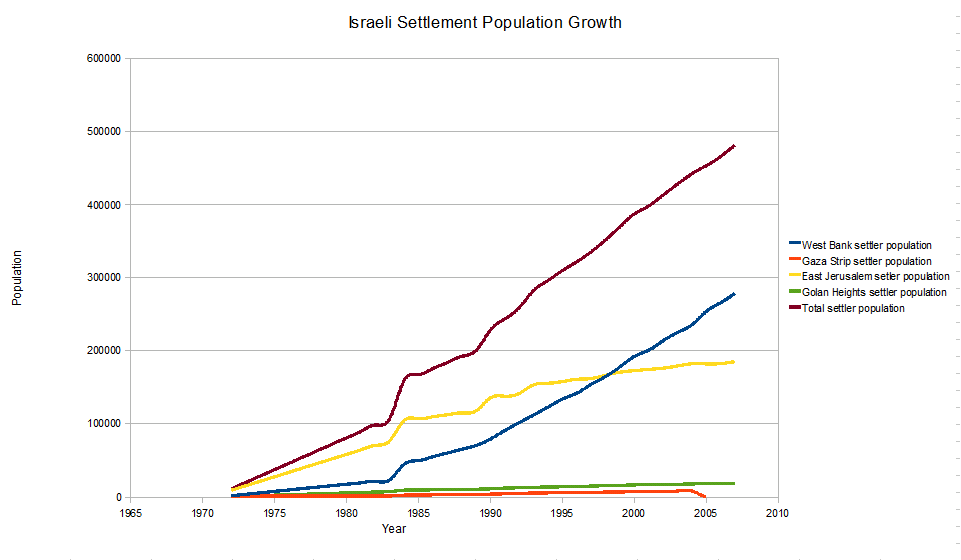
Settler population by year in the West Bank, Gaza Strip, East Jerusalem and Golan Heights 1972–2007

At the end of 2010, 534,224 Jewish Israelis lived in the West Bank, including East Jerusalem. 314,132 of them lived in the 121 authorised settlements and 102 unauthorised settlement outposts on the West Bank, 198,629 were living in East Jerusalem, and almost 20,000 lived in settlements in the Golan Heights.

By 2011, the number of Jewish settlers in the West Bank excluding East Jerusalem had increased to 328,423 people.

In June 2014, the number of Israeli settlers in the West Bank excluding East Jerusalem had increased to 382,031 people, with over 20,000 Israeli settlers in the Golan Heights.

In January 2015, the Israeli Interior Ministry gave figures of 389,250 Israeli citizens living in the West Bank outside East Jerusalem.

By the end of 2016, the West Bank Jewish population had risen to 420,899, excluding East Jerusalem, where there were more than 200,000 Jews.

In 2019, the number of Israeli settlers in the West Bank excluding East Jerusalem had risen to 441,600 individuals, and the number of Israeli settlers in the Golan Heights had risen to 25,261.

In 2020, the number of Israeli settlers in the West Bank excluding East Jerusalem had reportedly risen to 451,700 individuals, with an additional 220,000 Jews living in East Jerusalem.

Based on various sources, population dispersal can be estimated as follows:

Settler population	1948	1972	1977	1980	1983	1993	2004	2007	2010	2014	2018	2019	2020	2022
West Bank (excluding Jerusalem)	480 (see Gush Etzion)	1,182	3,200 -4,400	17,400	22,800	111,600	234,500	276,500	314,100	400,000	427,800	441,600	451,700	503,000
Gaza Strip ^{2}	30 (see Kfar Darom)	700 ^{1}	–		900	4,800	7,826	0						
East Jerusalem	2,300 (see Jewish Quarter, Atarot, Neve Yaakov)	8,649	–		76,095	152,800	181,587	189,708	198,629	–	218,000	–	220,000	230,000
Total	2,810	10,531			99,795	269,200	423,913	467,478	512,769		645,800		671,700	733,000
Golan Heights	0	77	–		6,800	12,600	17,265	18,692	19,797	21,000	–	25,261	–	

^{1} including Sinai
^{2} Janet Abu-Lughod mentions 500 settlers in Gaza in 1978 (excluding Sinai), and 1,000 in 1980

In addition to internal migration, in large though declining numbers, the settlements absorb annually about 1000 new immigrants from outside Israel. The American Kulanu organization works with such right-wing Israeli settler groups as Amishav and Shavei Israel to settle "lost" Jews of color in such areas where local Palestinians are being displaced. In the 1990s, the annual settler population growth was more than three times the annual population growth in Israel. Population growth has continued in the 2000s. According to the BBC, the settlements in the West Bank have been growing at a rate of 5–6% since 2001. In 2016, there were sixty thousand American Israelis living in settlements in the West Bank.

The establishment of settlements in the Palestinian territories is linked to the displacement of the Palestinian populations as evidenced by a 1979 Security Council Commission which established a link between Israeli settlements and the displacement of the local population. The commission also found that those who remained were under consistent pressure to leave to make room for further settlers who were being encouraged into the area. In conclusion the commission stated that settlement in the Palestinian territories was causing "profound and irreversible changes of a geographic and demographic nature".

== Administration and local government ==
=== West Bank ===
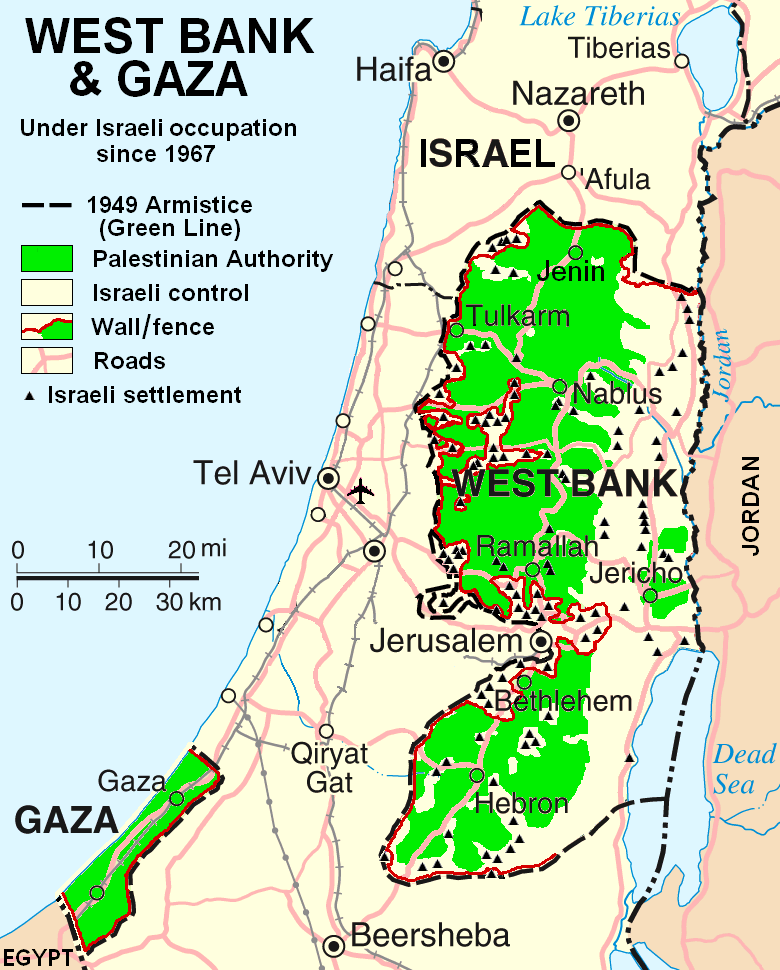
Map of the West Bank and the Gaza Strip with Israeli Settlements, 2007

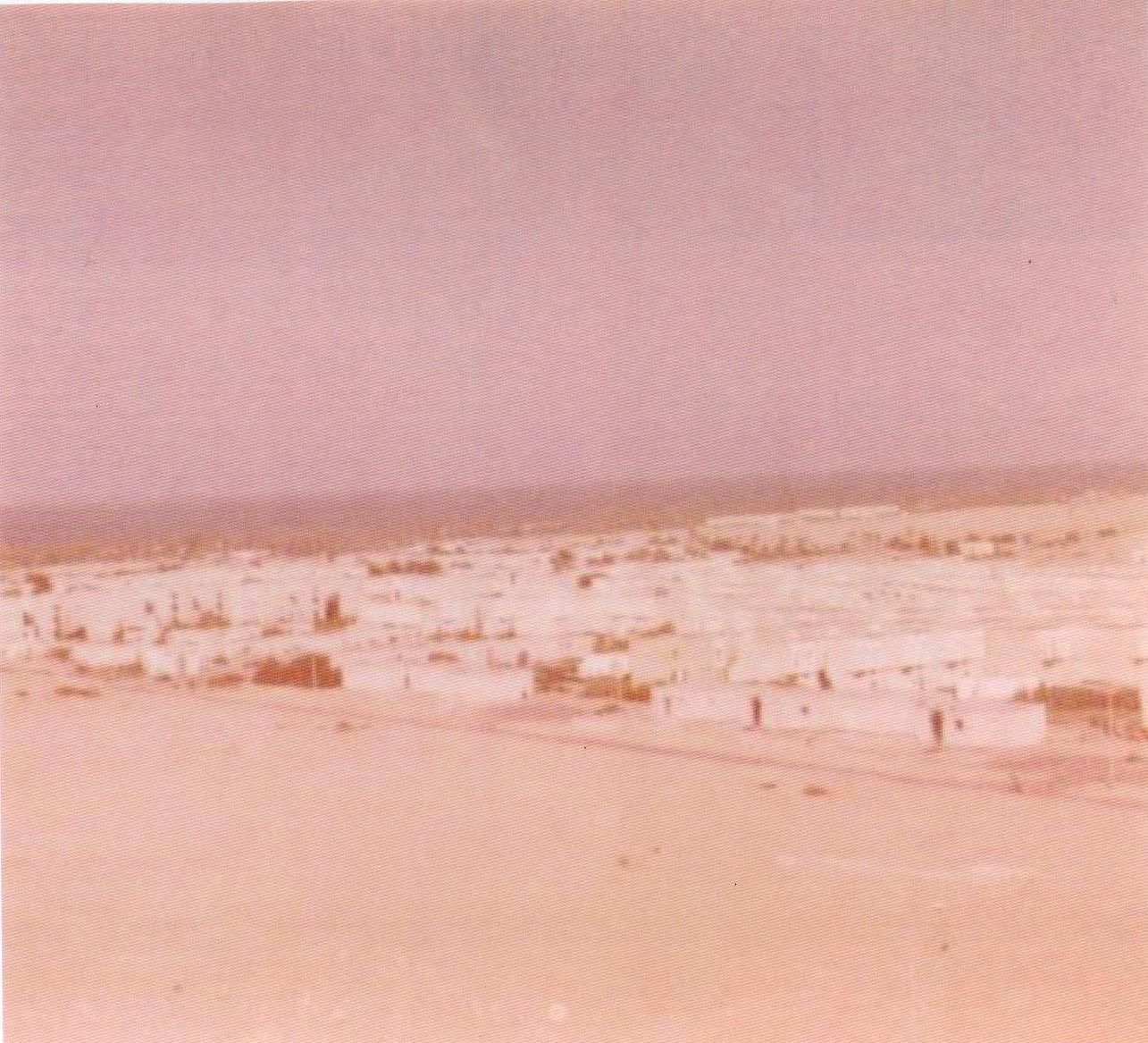
Yamit in the Sinai, between 1975 and 1980, evacuated by Israel in 1982

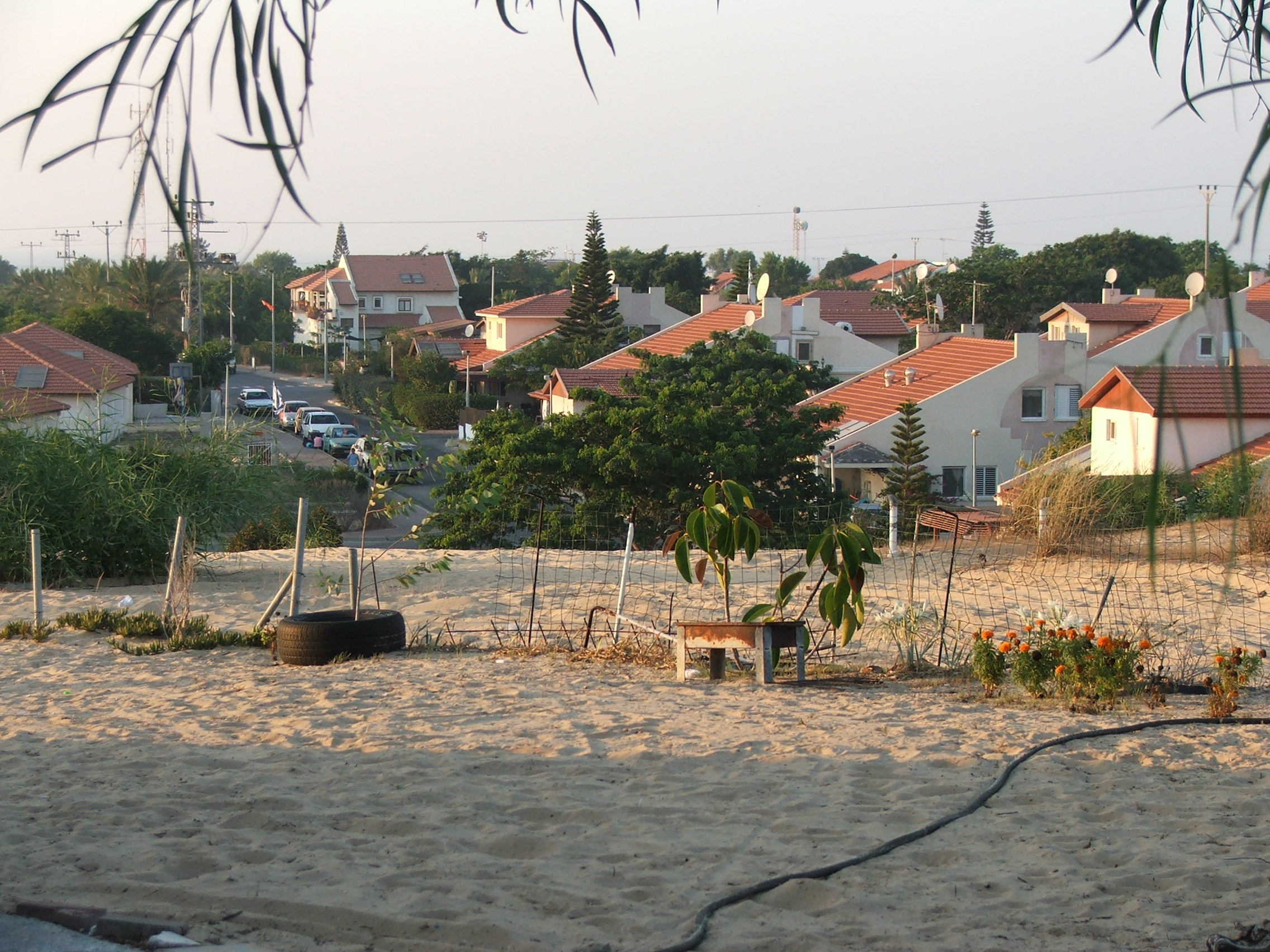
Neve Dekalim, Gaza Strip, evacuated by Israel in 2005

The Israeli settlements in the West Bank fall under the administrative district of Judea and Samaria Area. Since December 2007, approval by both the Israeli Prime Minister and Israeli Defense Minister of all settlement activities (including planning) in the West Bank is required. Authority for planning and construction is held by the Israel Defense Forces Civil Administration.

The area consists of four cities, thirteen local councils and six regional councils.

- Cities: Ariel, Betar Illit, Maale Adumim, Modi'in Illit;
- Local councils: Alfei Menashe, Beit Aryeh-Ofarim, Beit El, Efrat, Elkana, Giv'at Ze'ev, Har Adar, Immanuel, Karnei Shomron, Kedumim, Kiryat Arba, Ma'ale Efraim, Oranit;
- Regional councils: Gush Etzion (Ezion Bloc), Har Hebron (Mount Hebron), Matte Binyamin (Staff of Benjamin, named after the ancient Israelite tribe that dwelled in the area), Megilot (Scrolls, named after the Dead Sea scrolls, which were discovered in the area), Shomron Regional Council (Samaria), Biq'at HaYarden (Jordan valley).

The Yesha Council (Hebrew: מועצת יש"ע, Moatzat Yesha, a Hebrew acronym for Judea, Samaria and Gaza) is the umbrella organization of municipal councils in the West Bank.

The actual buildings of the Israeli settlements cover only one percent of the West Bank, but their jurisdiction and their regional councils extend to about 42 percent of the West Bank, according to the Israeli NGO B'Tselem. Yesha Council chairman Dani Dayan disputes the figures and claims that the settlements only control 9.2 percent of the West Bank.

Between 2001 and 2007 more than 10,000 Israeli settlement units were built, while 91 permits were issued for Palestinian construction, and 1,663 Palestinian structures were demolished in Area C.

West Bank Palestinians have their cases tried in Israel's military courts while Jewish Israeli settlers living in the same occupied territory are tried in civil courts. The arrangement has been described as "de facto segregation" by the UN Committee on the Elimination of Racial Discrimination. A bill to formally extend Israeli law to the Israeli settlements in the West Bank was rejected in 2012. The basic military laws governing the West Bank are influenced by what is called the "pipelining" of Israeli legislation. As a result of "enclave law", large portions of Israeli civil law are applied to Israeli settlements and Israeli residents in the occupied territories.

On 31 August 2014, Israel announced it was appropriating 400 hectares of land in the West Bank to eventually house 1,000 Israel families. The appropriation was described as the largest in more than 30 years. According to reports on Israel Radio, the development is a response to the 2014 kidnapping and murder of Israeli teenagers.

In March 2024 and during the Gaza war, it was announced that Israel was planning on building more than 3,300 new homes in the Kedar and Ma'ale Adumim settlements in the West Bank. The settlement expansion was announced by Israeli Finance Minister Bezalel Smotrich after three Palestinians opened fire near Ma'ale Adumim, killing one and wounding five, and drew criticism from the US due to increasing tensions. During the Gaza war, the lines between settlers and the military were described as having become "indistinguishable".

=== East Jerusalem ===
East Jerusalem is defined in the Jerusalem Law of 1980 as part of Israel and its capital, Jerusalem. As such it is administered as part of the city and its district, the Jerusalem District. Pre-1967 residents of East Jerusalem and their descendants have residency status in the city but many have refused Israeli citizenship. Thus, the Israeli government maintains an administrative distinction between Israeli citizens and non-citizens in East Jerusalem, but the Jerusalem municipality does not.

=== Golan Heights ===
The Golan Heights is administered under Israeli civil law as the Golan sub-district, a part of the Northern District. Israel makes no legal or administrative distinction between pre-1967 communities in the Golan Heights (mainly Druze) and the post-1967 settlements.

=== Sinai Peninsula ===
After the capture of the Sinai Peninsula from Egypt in the 1967 Six-Day War, settlements were established along the Gulf of Aqaba and in northeast Sinai, just below the Gaza Strip. Israel had plans to expand the settlement of Yamit into a city with a population of 200,000, though the actual population of Yamit did not exceed 3,000. The Sinai Peninsula was returned to Egypt in stages beginning in 1979 as part of the Egypt–Israel peace treaty. As required by the treaty, in 1982 Israel evacuated the Israeli civilian population from the 18 Sinai settlements in Sinai. In some instances evacuations were done forcefully, such as the evacuation of Yamit. All the settlements were then dismantled.

=== Gaza Strip ===
Before Israel's unilateral disengagement plan in which the Israeli settlements were evacuated, there were 21 settlements in the Gaza Strip under the administration of the Hof Aza Regional Council. The land was allocated in such a way that each Israeli settler disposed of 400 times the land available to the Palestinian refugees, and 20 times the volume of water allowed to the peasant farmers of the Strip.

== Legal status ==
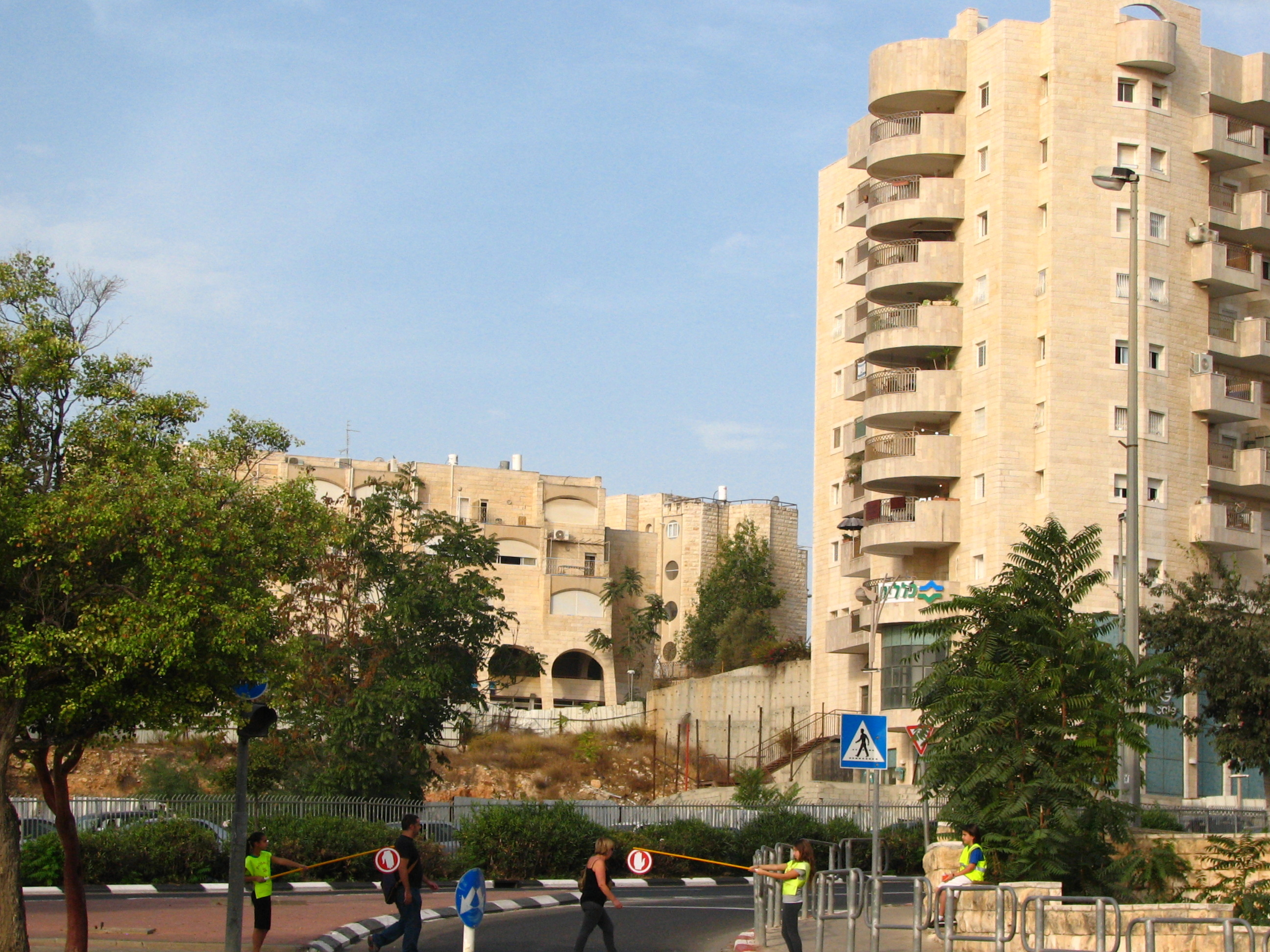
Gilo, East Jerusalem

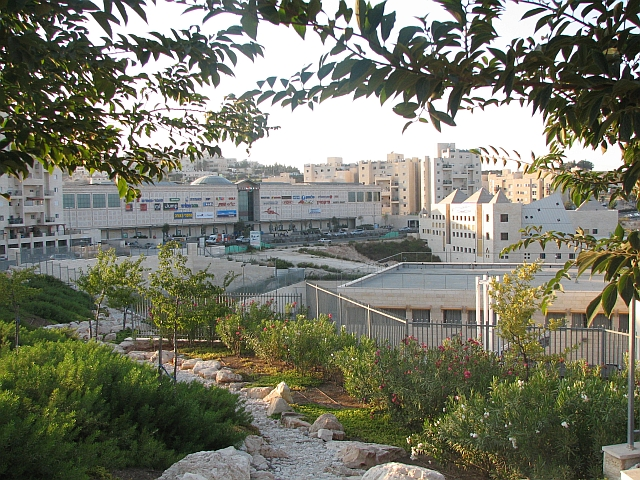
Pisgat Ze'ev, East Jerusalem

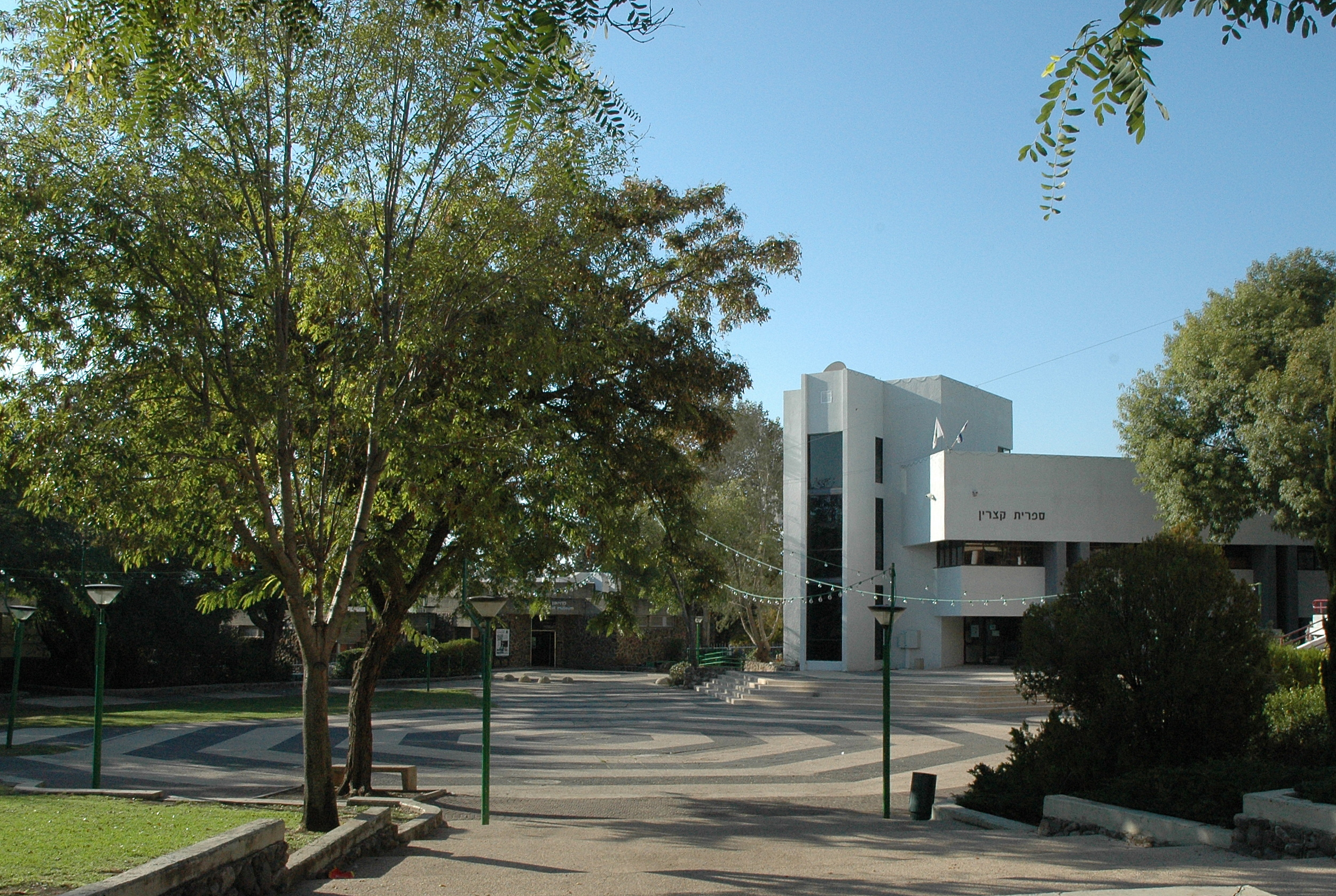
Katzrin, Golan Heights

The International Court of Justice delivered a landmark advisory opinion in July 2024 that Israel's occupation of West Bank, East Jerusalem and the Gaza Strip was illegal, that Israel had "an obligation to cease immediately all new settlement activities and to evacuate all settlers" from the West Bank and East Jerusalem, and that Israel should "make reparation for the damage caused to all" the people of such lands.

The consensus view in the international community is that the existence of Israeli settlements in the West Bank including East Jerusalem and the Golan Heights is in violation of international law. The Fourth Geneva Convention includes statements such as "the Occupying Power shall not deport or transfer parts of its own civilian population into the territory it occupies". On 20 December 2019, International Criminal Court chief prosecutor Fatou Bensouda announced an International Criminal Court investigation in Palestine into alleged war crimes committed during the Israeli–Palestinian conflict. At present, the view of the international community, as reflected in numerous UN resolutions, regards the building and existence of Israeli settlements in the West Bank, East Jerusalem and the Golan Heights as a violation of international law. UN Security Council Resolution 446 refers to the Fourth Geneva Convention as the applicable international legal instrument, and calls upon Israel to desist from transferring its own population into the territories or changing their demographic makeup. The reconvened Conference of the High Contracting Parties to the Geneva Conventions has declared the settlements illegal as has the primary judicial organ of the UN, the International Court of Justice.

The position of successive Israeli governments is that all authorized settlements are entirely legal and consistent with international law. In practice, Israel does not accept that the Fourth Geneva Convention applies de jure, but has stated that on humanitarian issues it will govern itself de facto by its provisions, without specifying which these are. The scholar and jurist Eugene Rostow has disputed the illegality of authorized settlements.

Under Israeli law, West Bank settlements must meet specific criteria to be legal. In 2009, there were approximately 100 small communities that did not meet these criteria and are referred to as illegal outposts.

In 2014 twelve EU countries warned businesses against involving themselves in the settlements. According to the warnings, economic activities relating to the settlements involve legal and economic risks stemming from the fact that the settlements are built on occupied land not recognized as Israel's.

=== Illegality arguments ===
The consensus of the international community – the vast majority of states, the overwhelming majority of legal experts, the International Court of Justice and the UN – is that settlements are in violation of international law. After the Six-Day War, in 1967, Theodor Meron, legal counsel to the Israeli Foreign Ministry stated in a legal opinion to the Prime Minister,

"My conclusion is that civilian settlement in the administered territories contravenes the explicit provisions of the Fourth Geneva Convention."

This legal opinion was sent to Prime Minister Levi Eshkol. However, it was not made public at the time. The Labor cabinet allowed settlements despite the warning. This paved the way for future settlement growth. In 2007, Meron stated that "I believe that I would have given the same opinion today."

In 1978, the Legal Adviser of the Department of State of the United States reached the same conclusion.

The International Court of Justice, in its advisory opinion, has since ruled that Israel is in breach of international law by establishing settlements in Occupied Palestinian Territory, including East Jerusalem. The Court maintains that Israel cannot rely on its right of self-defense or necessity to impose a regime that violates international law. The Court also ruled that Israel violates basic human rights by impeding liberty of movement and the inhabitants' right to work, health, education and an adequate standard of living.

International intergovernmental organizations such as the Conference of the High Contracting Parties to the Fourth Geneva Convention, major organs of the United Nations, the European Union, and Canada, also regard the settlements as a violation of international law. The Committee on the Elimination of Racial Discrimination wrote that "The status of the settlements was clearly inconsistent with Article 3 of the Convention, which, as noted in the Committee's General Recommendation XIX, prohibited all forms of racial segregation in all countries. There is a consensus among publicists that the prohibition of racial discrimination, irrespective of territories, is an imperative norm of international law." Amnesty International, and Human Rights Watch have also characterized the settlements as a violation of international law.

In late January 2013 a report drafted by three justices, presided over by Christine Chanet, and issued by the United Nations Human Rights Council declared that Jewish settlements constituted a creeping annexation based on multiple violations of the Geneva Conventions and international law, and stated that if Palestine ratified the Rome Accord, Israel could be tried for "gross violations of human rights law and serious violations of international humanitarian law." A spokesman for Israel's Foreign Ministry declared the report 'unfortunate' and accused the UN's Human Rights Council of a "systematically one-sided and biased approach towards Israel."

The Supreme Court of Israel, with a variety of different justices sitting, has repeatedly stated that Israel's presence in the West Bank is subject to international law.

=== Legality arguments ===
Four prominent jurists cited the concept of the "sovereignty vacuum" in the immediate aftermath of the Six-Day War to describe the legal status of the West Bank and Gaza: Yehuda Zvi Blum in 1968, Elihu Lauterpacht in 1968, Julius Stone in 1969 and 1981, and Stephen M. Schwebel in 1970. Eugene V. Rostow also argued in 1979 that the occupied territories' legal status was undetermined.

- Stephen M. Schwebel made three distinctions specific to the Israeli situation to claim that the territories were seized in self-defense and that Israel has more title to them than the previous holders.
- Julius Stone also wrote that "Israel's presence in all these areas pending negotiation of new borders is entirely lawful, since Israel entered them lawfully in self-defense." He argued that it would be an "irony bordering on the absurd" to read Article 49(6) as meaning that the State of Israel was obliged to ensure (by force if necessary) that areas with a millennial association with Jewish life shall be forever "judenrein".

Professor Ben Saul took exception to this view, arguing that Article 49(6) can be read to include voluntary or assisted transfers, as indeed it was in the advisory opinion of the International Court of Justice which had expressed this interpretation in the Israeli Wall Advisory Opinion (2003).

Israel maintains that a temporary use of land and buildings for various purposes is permissible under a plea of military necessity and that the settlements fulfilled security needs. Israel argues that its settlement policy is consistent with international law, including the Fourth Geneva Convention, while recognising that some settlements have been constructed illegally on private land. The Israeli Supreme Court has ruled that the power of the Civil Administration and the Military Commander in the occupied territories is limited by the entrenched customary rules of public international law as codified in the Hague Regulations. In 1998 the Israeli Minister of Foreign Affairs produced "The International Criminal Court Background Paper". It concludes

International law has long recognised that there are crimes of such severity they should be considered "international crimes." Such crimes have been established in treaties such as the Genocide Convention and the Geneva Conventions... The following are Israel's primary issues of concern [i.e. with the rules of the ICC]: The inclusion of settlement activity as a "war crime" is a cynical attempt to abuse the Court for political ends. The implication that the transfer of civilian population to occupied territories can be classified as a crime equal in gravity to attacks on civilian population centres or mass murder is preposterous and has no basis in international law.

A UN conference was held in Rome in 1998, where Israel was one of seven countries to vote against the Rome Statute to establish the International Criminal Court. Israel was opposed to a provision that included as a war crime the transfer of civilian populations into territory the government occupies. Israel has signed the statute, but not ratified the treaty.

== Land ownership ==
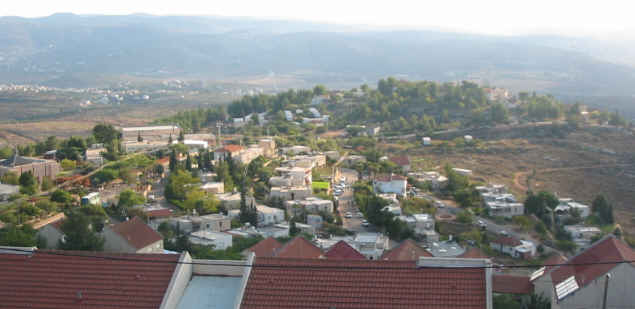
Elon Moreh, West Bank

A 1996 amendment to an Israeli military order states that land privately owned can not be part of a settlement unless the land in question has been confiscated for military purposes. In 2006 Peace Now acquired a report, which it claims was leaked from the Israeli Government's Civil Administration, indicating that up to 40 percent of the land Israel plans to retain in the West Bank is privately owned by Palestinians. Peace Now called this a violation of Israeli law. Peace Now published a comprehensive report about settlements on private lands. In the wake of a legal battle, Peace Now lowered the figure to 32 percent, which the Civil Administration also denied. The Washington Post reported that "The 38-page report offers what appears to be a comprehensive argument against the Israeli government's contention that it avoids building on private land, drawing on the state's own data to make the case."

In February 2008, the Civil Administration stated that the land on which more than a third of West Bank settlements was built had been expropriated by the IDF for "security purposes." The unauthorized seizure of private Palestinian land was defined by the Civil Administration itself as 'theft.' According to B'Tselem, more than 42 percent of the West Bank are under control of the Israeli settlements, 21 percent of which was seized from private Palestinian owners, much of it in violation of the 1979 Israeli Supreme Court decision.

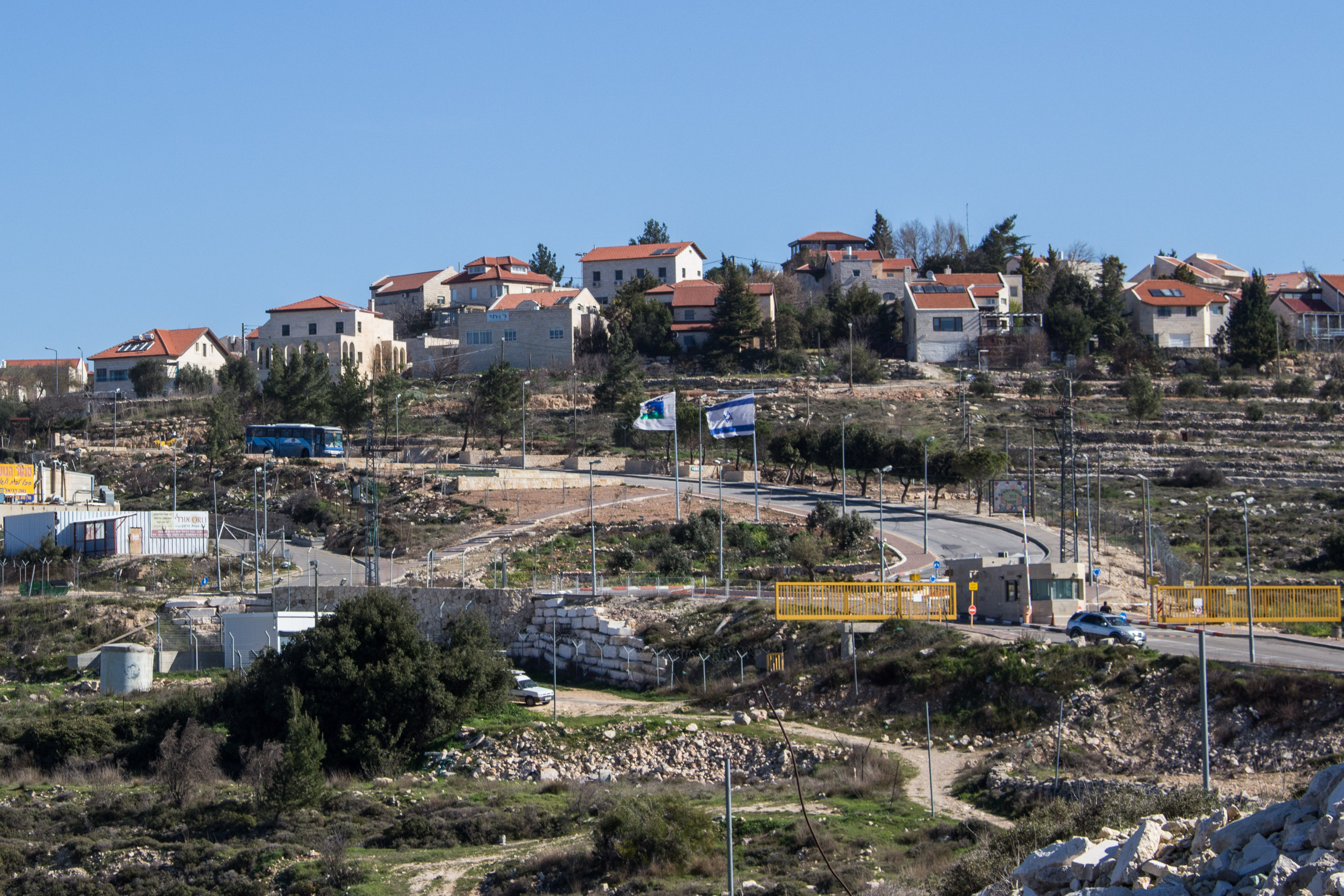
Neve Daniel, West Bank

In 1979, the government decided to extend settlements or build new ones only on "state lands".

A secret database, drafted by a retired senior officer, Baruch Spiegel, on orders from former defense minister Shaul Mofaz, found that some settlements deemed legal by Israel were illegal outposts, and that large portions of Ofra, Elon Moreh and Beit El were built on private Palestinian land. The "Spiegel report" was revealed by Haaretz in 2009. Many settlements are largely built on private lands, without approval of the Israeli Government. According to Israel, the bulk of the land was vacant, was leased from the state, or bought fairly from Palestinian landowners.

Invoking the Absentees' Property Laws to transfer, sell or lease property in East Jerusalem owned by Palestinians who live elsewhere without compensation has been criticized both inside and outside of Israel. Opponents of the settlements claim that "vacant" land belonged to Arabs who fled or collectively to an entire village, a practice that developed under Ottoman rule. B'Tselem charged that Israel is using the absence of modern legal documents for the communal land as a legal basis for expropriating it. These "abandoned lands" are sometimes laundered through a series of fraudulent sales.

According to Amira Hass, one of the techniques used by Israel to expropriate Palestinian land is to place desired areas under a "military firing zone" classification, and then issue orders for the evacuation of Palestinians from the villages in that range while allowing contiguous Jewish settlements to remain unaffected.

== Effects on Palestinian human rights ==
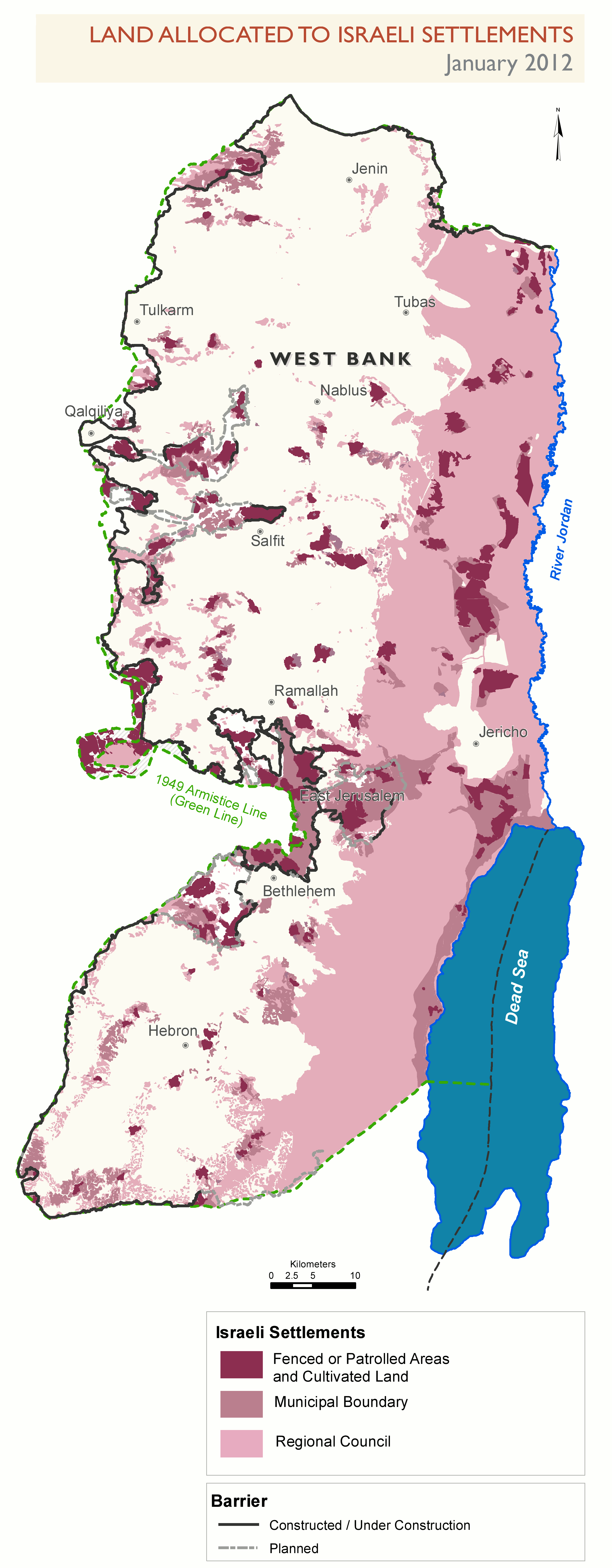
Parts of the West Bank allocated to the settlements, as of January 2012 (in pink and purple color). Access is prohibited or restricted to Palestinians.

Amnesty International argues that Israel's settlement policy is discriminatory and a violation of Palestinian human rights. B'Tselem claims that Israeli travel restrictions impact on Palestinian freedom of movement and Palestinian human rights have been violated in Hebron due to the presence of the settlers within the city. According to B'Tselem, over fifty percent of West Bank land expropriated from Palestinians has been used to establish settlements and create reserves of land for their future expansion. The seized lands mainly benefit the settlements and Palestinians cannot use them. The roads built by Israel in the West Bank to serve the settlements are closed to Palestinian vehicles' and act as a barrier often between villages and the lands on which they subsist.

Human Rights Watch and other human rights observer volunteer regularly file reports on "settler violence", referring to stoning and shooting incidents involving Israeli settlers. Israel's withdrawal from Gaza and Hebron have led to violent settler protests and disputes over land and resources. Meron Benvenisti described the settlement enterprise as a "commercial real estate project that conscripts Zionist rhetoric for profit."

The construction of the Israeli West Bank barrier has been criticized as an infringement on Palestinian human and land rights. The United Nations Office for the Coordination of Humanitarian Affairs estimated that 10% of the West Bank would fall on the Israeli side of the barrier.

In July 2012, the UN Human Rights Council decided to set up a probe into Jewish settlements. The report of the independent international fact-finding mission which investigated the "implications of the Israeli settlements on the civil, political, economic, social and cultural rights of the Palestinian people throughout the Occupied Palestinian Territory" was published in February 2013.

In February 2020, the Office of the United Nations High Commissioner for Human Rights published a list of 112 companies linked to activities related to Israeli settlements in the occupied West Bank.

In a June 2026 report, Amnesty International accused the Israeli government of carrying out a campaign of ethnic cleansing against Palestinians in the occupied West Bank. According to the organization, the displacement of Palestinians was not simply the result of violence by individual settlers but formed part of a broader state policy. Amnesty also argued that settler violence played a significant role in the process. Citing United Nations data, the report said that more than 100 Palestinian communities had been fully or partly emptied between 2023 and 2026, while thousands of other Palestinians were displaced following demolitions carried out by Israeli authorities. The report examined 27 villages and hamlets where Palestinians were displaced between 2023 and 2025 and said that settlement growth and the creation of new outposts had increased since October 2023.

== Economy ==
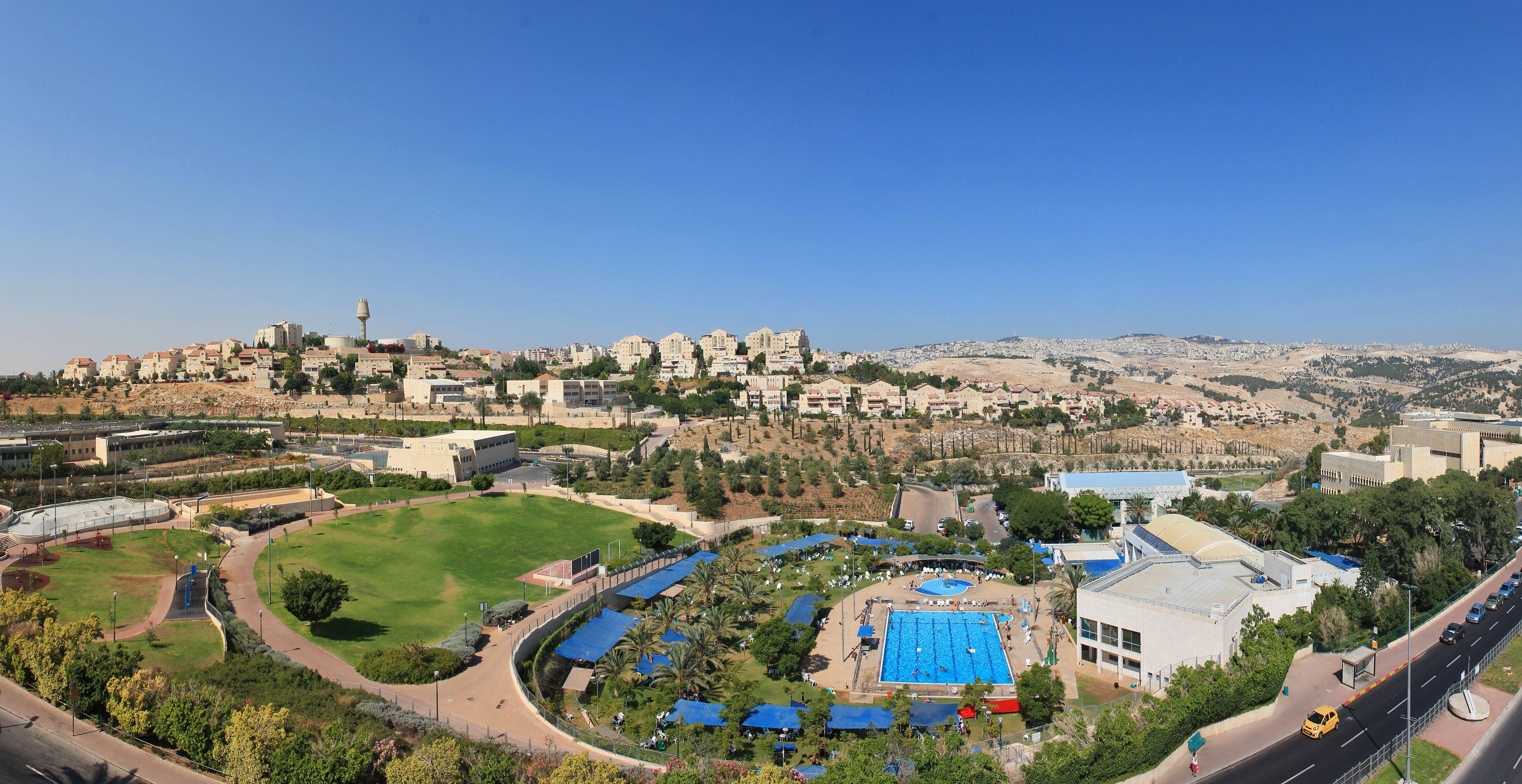
Many residents of Ma'ale Adumim work in Mishor Adumim industrial park

Goods produced in Israeli settlements are able to stay competitive on the global market, in part because of massive state subsidies they receive from the Israeli government. Farmers and producers are given state assistance, while companies that set up in the territories receive tax breaks and direct government subsidies. An Israeli government fund has also been established to help companies pay customs penalties. Palestinian officials estimate that settlers sell goods worth some $500 million to the Palestinian market. Israel has built 16 industrial zones, containing roughly 1000 industrial plants, in the West Bank and East Jerusalem on acreage that consumes large parts of the territory planned for a future Palestinian state. According to Jodi Rudoren these installations both entrench the occupation and provide work for Palestinians, even those opposed to it. The 16 parks are located at Shaked, Beka'ot, Baran, Karnei Shomron, Emmanuel, Barkan, Ariel, Shilo, Halamish, Ma'ale Efraim, Sha'ar Binyamin, Atarot, Mishor Adumim, Gush Etzion, Kiryat Arba and Metarim (2001). In spite of this, the West Bank settlements have failed to develop a self-sustaining local economy. About 60% of the settler workforce commutes to Israel for work. The settlements rely primarily on the labor of their residents in Israel proper rather than local manufacturing, agriculture, or research and development. Of the industrial parks in the settlements, there are only two significant ones, at Ma'ale Adumim and Barkan, with most of the workers there being Palestinian. Only a few hundred settler households cultivate agricultural land, and rely primarily on Palestinian labor in doing so.

Settlement has an economic dimension, much of it driven by the significantly lower costs of housing for Israeli citizens living in Israeli settlements compared to the cost of housing and living in Israel proper. Government spending per citizen in the settlements is double that spent per Israeli citizen in Tel Aviv and Jerusalem, while government spending for settlers in isolated Israeli settlements is three times the Israeli national average. Most of the spending goes to the security of the Israeli citizens living there.

=== Export to EU ===
According to Israeli government estimates, $230 million worth of settler goods including fruit, vegetables, cosmetics, textiles and toys are exported to the EU each year, accounting for approximately 2% of all Israeli exports to Europe. A 2013 report of Profundo revealed that at least 38 Dutch companies imported settlement products.

European Union law requires a distinction to be made between goods originating in Israel and those from the occupied territories. The former benefit from preferential custom treatment according to the EU-Israel Association Agreement (2000); the latter do not, having been explicitly excluded from the agreement. In practice, however, settler goods often avoid mandatory customs through being labelled as originating in Israel, while European customs authorities commonly fail to complete obligatory postal code checks of products to ensure they have not originated in the occupied territories.

In 2009, the United Kingdom's Department for the Environment, Food and Rural Affairs issued new guidelines concerning labelling of goods imported from the West Bank. The new guidelines require labelling to clarify whether West Bank products originate from settlements or from the Palestinian economy. Israel's foreign ministry said that the UK was "catering to the demands of those whose ultimate goal is the boycott of Israeli products"; but this was denied by the UK government, who said that the aim of the new regulations was to allow consumers to choose for themselves what produce they buy. Denmark has similar legislation requiring food products from settlements in the occupied territories to be accurately labelled. In June 2022, Norway also stated that it would begin complying with EU regulation to label produce originating from Israeli settlements in the West Bank and Golan Heights as such.

On 12 November 2019 the Court of Justice of the European Union in a ruling covering all territory Israel captured in the 1967 war decided that labels on foodstuffs must not imply that goods produced in occupied territory came from Israel itself and must "prevent consumers from being misled as to the fact that the State of Israel is present in the territories concerned as an occupying power and not as a sovereign entity". In its ruling, the court said that failing to inform EU consumers they were potentially buying goods produced in settlements denies them access to "ethical considerations and considerations relating to the observance of international law".

In January 2019 the Dáil Éireann (Ireland's lower house) voted in favour, by 78 to 45, of the Control of Economic Activity (Occupied Territories) Bill. This piece of legislation prohibits the purchasing of any good and/or service from the Golan Heights, East Jerusalem or West Bank settlements. The Bill made no further progress until 2024 when the then government sought legal advice from the Attorney General in response to the International Court of Justice's advisory opinion on Israel's occupation of the Palestinian territories. Following the Attorney General's advice the Tánaiste and Minister for Foreign Affairs, Micheál Martin confirmed on 22 October 2024 that the Bill would be "reviewed and amendments prepared in order to bring in into line with the Constitution and EU Law". On 31 October 2024, it was reported that a technical blockage of the Bill would be removed to allow it to proceed to committee stage, however the Bill was not passed before the Dáil was suspended sine die on the 7 November 2024 marking the end of the 33rd Dáil.

A petition under the European Citizens' Initiative, submitted in September 2021, was accepted on 20 February 2022. The petition seeks the adoption of legislation to ban trade with unlawful settlements. The petition requires a million signatures from across the EU and has received support from civil society groups including Human Rights Watch.

In August 2026, the Dutch government banned products from Israeli settlements in the West Bank, East Jerusalem and the Golan Heights.

=== Palestinian economy and resources ===
A Palestinian report argued in 2011 that settlements have a detrimental effect on the Palestinian economy, equivalent to about 85% of the nominal gross domestic product of Palestine, and that the "occupation enterprise" allows the state of Israel and commercial firms to profit from Palestinian natural resources and tourist potential. A 2013 report published by the World Bank analysed the impact that the limited access to Area C lands and resources had on the Palestinian economy. While settlements represent a single axis of control, it is the largest with 68% of the Area C lands reserved for the settlements. The report goes on to calculate that access to the lands and resources of Area C, including the territory in and around settlements, would increase the Palestinian GDP by some $3.5 billion (or 35%) per year.

The Israeli Supreme Court has ruled that Israeli companies are entitled to exploit the West Bank's natural resources for economic gain, and that international law must be "adapted" to the "reality on the ground" of long-term occupation.

== Palestinian labour ==
Due to the availability of jobs offering twice the prevailing salary of the West Bank (as of August 2013), as well as high unemployment, tens of thousands of Palestinians work in Israeli settlements. According to the Manufacturers Association of Israel, some 22,000 Palestinians were employed in construction, agriculture, manufacturing and service industries. An Al-Quds University study in 2011 found that 82% of Palestinian workers said they would prefer to not work in Israeli settlements if they had alternative employment in the West Bank.

Palestinians have been highly involved in the construction of settlements in the West Bank. In 2013, the Palestinian Central Bureau of Statistics released their survey showing that the number of Palestinian workers who are employed by the Jewish settlements increased from 16,000 to 20,000 in the first quarter. The survey also found that Palestinians who work in Israel and the settlements are paid more than twice their salary compared to what they receive from Palestinian employers.

In 2008, Kav LaOved charged that Palestinians who work in Israeli settlements are not granted basic protections of Israeli labor law. Instead, they are employed under Jordanian labor law, which does not require minimum wage, payment for overtime and other social rights. In 2007, the Supreme Court of Israel ruled that Israeli labor law does apply to Palestinians working in West Bank settlements and applying different rules in the same work place constituted discrimination. The ruling allowed Palestinian workers to file lawsuits in Israeli courts. In 2008, the average sum claimed by such lawsuits stood at 100,000 shekels.

According to the Palestinian Center for Policy and Survey Research, 63% of Palestinians opposed PA plans to prosecute Palestinians who work in the settlements. However, 72% of Palestinians support a boycott of the products they sell. Although the Palestinian Authority has criminalized working in the settlements, the director-general at the Palestinian Ministry of Labor, Samer Salameh, described the situation in February 2014 as being "caught between two fires". He said "We strongly discourage work in the settlements, since the entire enterprise is illegal and illegitimate...but given the high unemployment rate and the lack of alternatives, we do not enforce the law that criminalizes work in the settlements."

== Violence ==
=== Israeli settler violence ===
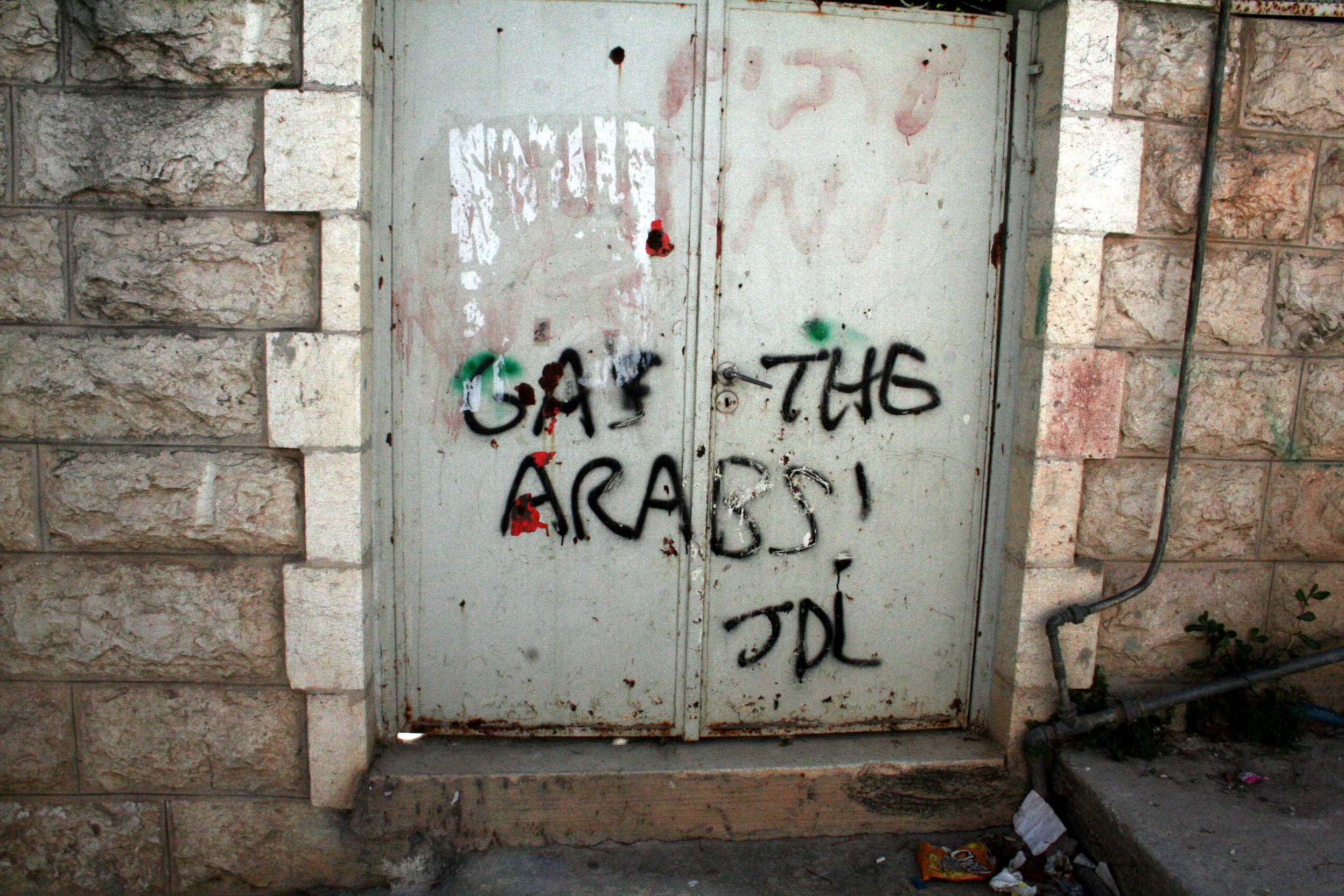
Graffiti in Hebron, in the Israeli-occupied West Bank, calling for the gassing of Arabs, above a tag for the right-wing group the Jewish Defense League

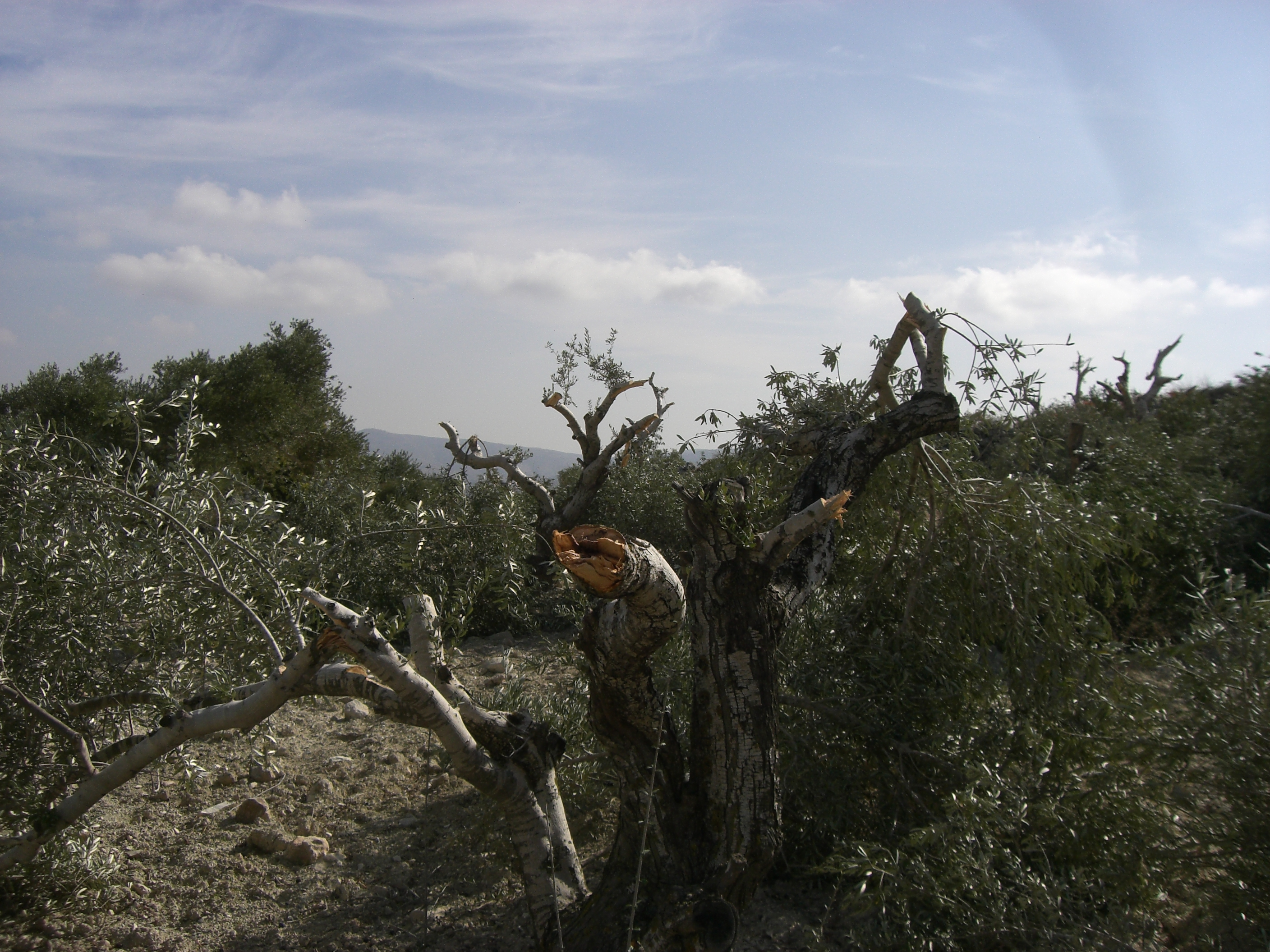
Olive trees in the village of Burin allegedly vandalized by settlers from the settlement Yitzhar in November 2009

Gush Emunim Underground was a militant organization that operated in 1979–1984. The organization planned attacks on Palestinian officials and the Dome of the Rock. In 1994, Baruch Goldstein of Hebron, a member of Kach carried out the Cave of the Patriarchs massacre, killing 29 Muslim worshipers and injuring 125. The attack was widely condemned by the Israeli government and Jewish community. The Palestinian leadership has accused Israel of "encouraging and enabling" settler violence in a bid to provoke Palestinian riots and violence in retaliation. Violence perpetrated by Israeli settlers against Palestinians constitutes terrorism according to the U.S. Department of State, and former IDF Head of Central Command Avi Mizrahi stated that such violence constitutes "terror."

In mid-2008, a UN report recorded 222 acts of Israeli settler violence against Palestinians and IDF troops compared with 291 in 2007. This trend reportedly increased in 2009. Maj-Gen Shamni said that the number had risen from a few dozen individuals to hundreds, and called it "a very grave phenomenon." In 2008–2009, the defense establishment adopted a harder line against the extremists. This group responded with a tactic dubbed "price tagging", vandalizing Palestinian property whenever police or soldiers were sent in to dismantle outposts. From January through to September 2013, 276 attacks by settlers against Palestinians were recorded.

Leading religious figures in the West Bank have harshly criticized these tactics. Rabbi Menachem Froman of Tekoa said that "Targeting Palestinians and their property is a shocking thing, ... It's an act of hurting humanity. ... This builds a wall of fire between Jews and Arabs." The Yesha Council and Hanan Porat also condemned such actions. Other rabbis have been accused of inciting violence against non-Jews. In response to settler violence, the Israeli government said that it would increase law enforcement and cut off aid to illegal outposts. Some settlers are thought to lash out at Palestinians because they are "easy victims." The United Nations accused Israel of failing to intervene and arrest settlers suspected of violence. In 2008, Haaretz wrote that "Israeli society has become accustomed to seeing lawbreaking settlers receive special treatment and no other group could similarly attack Israeli law enforcement agencies without being severely punished."

In September 2011, settlers vandalized a mosque and an army base. They slashed tires and cut cables of 12 army vehicles and sprayed graffiti. In November 2011, the United Nations Office for Coordination of Human Affairs (OCHA) in the Palestinian territories published a report on settler violence that showed a significant rise compared to 2009 and 2010. The report covered physical violence and property damage such as uprooted olive trees, damaged tractors and slaughtered sheep. The report states that 90% of complaints filed by Palestinians have been closed without charge.

According to EU reports, Israel has created an "atmosphere of impunity" for Jewish attackers, which is seen as tantamount to tacit approval by the state. In the West Bank, Jews and Palestinians live under two different legal regimes and it is difficult for Palestinians to lodge complaints, which must be filed in Hebrew in Israeli settlements.

The 27 ministers of foreign affairs of the European Union published a report in May 2012 strongly denouncing policies of the State of Israel in the West Bank and denouncing "continuous settler violence and deliberate provocations against Palestinian civilians." The report by all EU ministers called "on the government of Israel to bring the perpetrators to justice and to comply with its obligations under international law."

In July 2014, a day after the burial of three murdered Israeli teens, Khdeir, a 16-year-old Palestinian, was forced into a car by 3 Israeli settlers on an East Jerusalem street. His family immediately reported the fact to Israeli Police who located his charred body a few hours later at Givat Shaul in the Jerusalem Forest. Preliminary results from the autopsy suggested that he was beaten and burnt while still alive. The murder suspects explained the attack as a response to the June abduction and murder of three Israeli teens. The murders contributed to a breakout of hostilities in the 2014 Israel–Gaza conflict. In July 2015, a similar incident occurred where Israeli settlers made an arson attack on two Palestinian houses, one of which was empty; however, the other was occupied, resulting in the burning to death of a Palestinian infant; the four other members of his family were evacuated to the hospital suffering serious injuries. These two incidents received condemnation from the United States, European Union and the IDF. The European Union criticized Israel for "failing to protect the Palestinian population".

Germany denounced Israel's proposal to construct over 750 housing units in the West Bank in December 2025, stating that "this construction contravenes international law and UN Security Council resolutions."

In September 2026, Britain, along with France and Canada, issued the strongest condemnation of Israeli actions they described as terrorism. Foreign Secretary Miliband, while announcing a ban on all trade with Israeli settlements—including a prohibition on importing goods from the settlements, financing settlement construction, and the sale of settlement property in the UK—stated that these actions amounted to ethnic cleansing in the West Bank. He added that this could be a prelude to justice. In response to this decision by the British Labour government, Israel announced four retaliatory measures against the United Kingdom, including the closure of the British consulate in East Jerusalem, removing British representatives in Gaza, and terminating training for Palestinian forces. According to Al Jazeera, Israel's order to close it confirms its view of Jerusalem as its undivided capital.

=== Olive trees ===
While the economy of Palestine has shown signs of growth, the International Committee of the Red Cross reported that Palestinian olive farming has suffered. According to the ICRC, 10,000 olive trees were cut down or burned by settlers in 2007–2010. Foreign ministry spokesman Yigal Palmor said the report ignored official PA data showing that the economic situation of Palestinians had improved substantially, citing Mahmoud Abbas's comment to The Washington Post in May 2009, where he said "in the West Bank, we have a good reality, the people are living a normal life."

Haaretz blamed the violence during the olive harvest on a handful of extremists. In 2010, trees belonging to both Jews and Arabs were cut down, poisoned or torched. In the first two weeks of the harvest, 500 trees owned by Palestinians and 100 trees owned by Jews had been vandalized. In October 2013, 100 trees were cut down.

Violent attacks on olive trees seem to be facilitated by the apparently systematic refusal of the Israeli authorities to allow Palestinians to visit their own groves, sometimes for years, especially in cases where the groves are deemed to be too close to settlements.

=== Palestinian violence against settlers ===
Israeli civilians living in settlements have been targeted by violence from armed Palestinian groups. These groups, according to Human Rights Watch, assert that settlers are "legitimate targets" that have "forfeited their civilian status by residing in settlements that are illegal under international humanitarian law." Both Human Rights Watch and B'tselem rejected this argument on the basis that the legal status of the settlements has no effect on the civilian status of their residents. Human Rights Watch said the "prohibition against intentional attacks against civilians is absolute." B'tselem said "The settlers constitute a distinctly civilian population, which is entitled to all the protections granted civilians by international law. The Israeli security forces' use of land in the settlements or the membership of some settlers in the Israeli security forces does not affect the status of the other residents living among them, and certainly does not make them proper targets of attack."

Fatal attacks on settlers have included firing of rockets and mortars and drive-by shootings, also targeting infants and children. Violent incidents include the murder of Shalhevet Pass, a ten-month-old baby shot by a Palestinian sniper in Hebron, and the murder of two teenagers by unknown perpetrators on 8 May 2001, whose bodies were hidden in a cave near Tekoa, a crime that Israeli authorities suggest may have been committed by Palestinian terrorists. In the Bat Ayin axe attack, children in Bat Ayin were attacked by a Palestinian wielding an axe and a knife. A 13-year-old boy was killed and another was seriously wounded. Rabbi Meir Hai, a father of seven, was killed in a drive-by shooting. In August 2011, five members of one family were killed in their beds. The victims were the father Ehud (Udi) Fogel, the mother Ruth Fogel, and three of their six children—Yoav, 11, Elad, 4, and Hadas, the youngest, a three-month-old infant. According to David Ha'ivri, and as reported by multiple sources, the infant was decapitated.

==== Pro-Palestinian activist violence ====
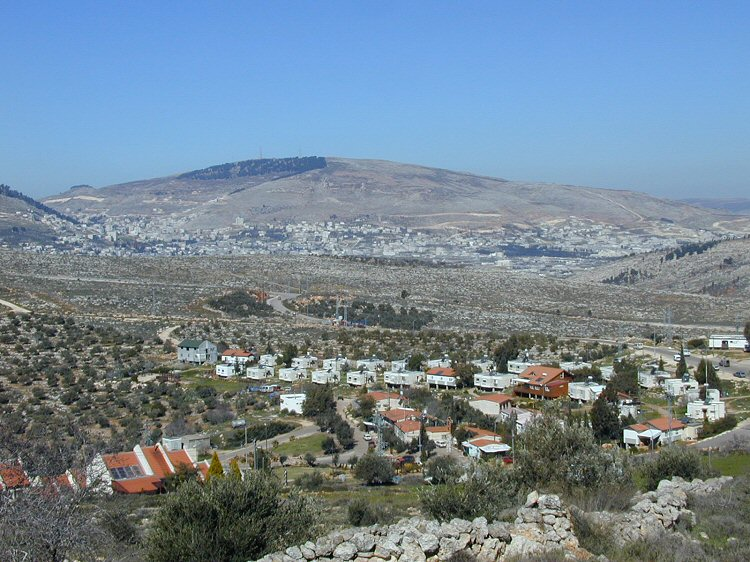
Itamar, West Bank. Itamar's residents have been the target of deadly attacks by Palestinian militants. Itamar settlers have also committed violent acts against local Palestinians.

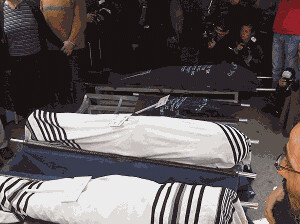
Funeral of Fogel family, killed in Itamar attack

Pro-Palestinian activists who hold regular protests near the settlements have been accused of stone-throwing, physical assault and provocation. In 2008, Avshalom Peled, head of the Israel Police's Hebron district, called "left-wing" activity in the city dangerous and provocative, and accused activists of antagonizing the settlers in the hope of getting a reaction.

== Environmental issues ==
Municipal Environmental Associations of Judea and Samaria, an environmental awareness group, was established by the settlers to address sewage treatment problems and cooperate with the Palestinian Authority on environmental issues. According to a 2004 report by Friends of the Earth Middle East, settlers account for 10% of the population in the West Bank but produce 25% of the sewage output. Beit Duqqu and Qalqilyah have accused settlers of polluting their farmland and villagers claim children have become ill after swimming in a local stream. Legal action was taken against 14 settlements by the Israeli Ministry of the Environment. The Palestinian Authority has also been criticized by environmentalists for not doing more to prevent water pollution. Settlers and Palestinians share the mountain aquifer as a water source, and both generate sewage and industrial effluents that endanger the aquifer. Friends of the Earth Middle East claimed that sewage treatment was inadequate in both sectors. Sewage from Palestinian sources was estimated at 46 million cubic meters a year, and sources from settler sources at 15 million cubic meters a year. A 2004 study found that sewage was not sufficiently treated in many settlements, while sewage from Palestinian villages and cities flowed into unlined cesspits, streams and the open environment with no treatment at all.

In a 2007 study, the Israel Nature and Parks Authority and Israeli Ministry of Environmental Protection, found that Palestinian towns and cities produced 56 million cubic meters of sewage per year, 94 percent discharged without adequate treatment, while Israeli sources produced 17.5 million cubic meters per year, 31.5 percent without adequate treatment.

According to Palestinian environmentalists, the settlers operate industrial and manufacturing plants that can create pollution as many do not conform to Israeli standards. In 2005, an old quarry between Kedumim and Nablus was slated for conversion into an industrial waste dump. Pollution experts warned that the dump would threaten Palestinian water sources.

== Impact on Palestinian demographics ==
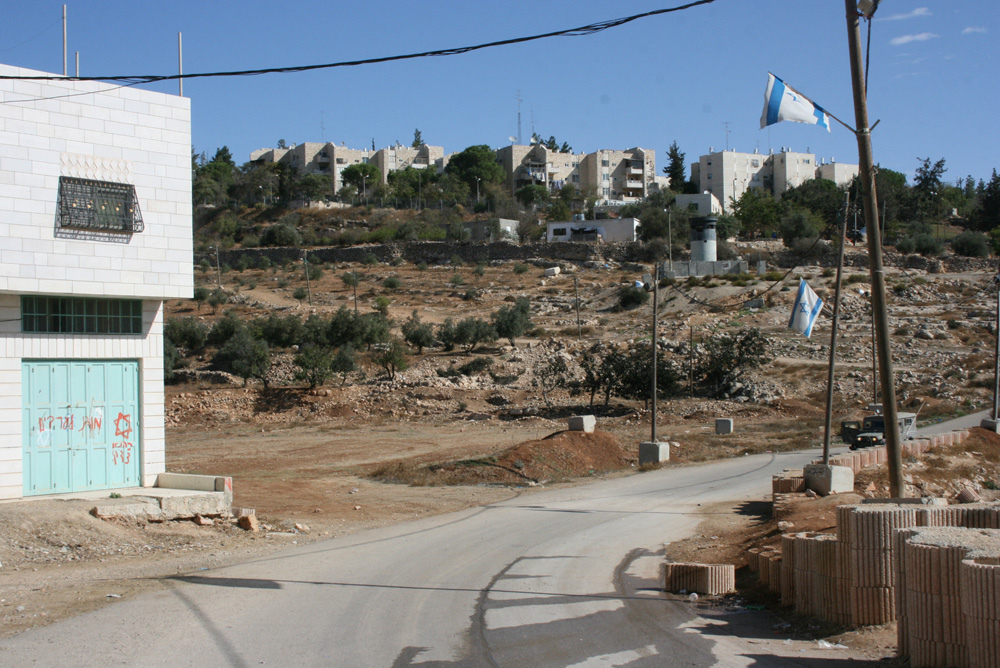
Road to Kiryat Arba, Hebron, 2010

The Consortium for Applied Research on International Migration (CARIM) has reported in their 2011 migration profile for Palestine that the reasons for individuals to leave the country are similar to those of other countries in the region and they attribute less importance to the specific political situation of the occupied Palestinian territory. Human Rights Watch in 2010 reported that Israeli settlement policies have had the effect of "forcing residents to leave their communities".

In 2008, Condoleezza Rice suggested sending Palestinian refugees to South America, which might reduce pressure on Israel to withdraw from the settlements. Sushil P. Seth speculates that Israelis might feel that increasing settlements will force many Palestinians to flee to other countries and that the remainder will be forced to live under Israeli terms. Speaking anonymously with regard to Israeli policies in the South Hebron Hills, a UN expert said that the Israeli crackdown on alternative energy infrastructures like solar panels is part of a deliberate strategy in Area C.

"From December 2010 to April 2011, we saw a systematic targeting of the water infrastructure in Hebron, Bethlehem and the Jordan valley. Now, in the last couple of months, they are targeting electricity. Two villages in the area have had their electrical poles demolished. There is this systematic effort by the civil administration targeting all Palestinian infrastructure in Hebron. They are hoping that by making it miserable enough, they [the Palestinians] will pick up and leave."

Approximately 1,500 people in 16 communities are dependent on energy produced by these installations duct business are threatened with work stoppage orders from the Israeli administration on their installation of alternative power infrastructure, and demolition orders expected to follow will darken the homes of 500 people.

== Educational institutions ==
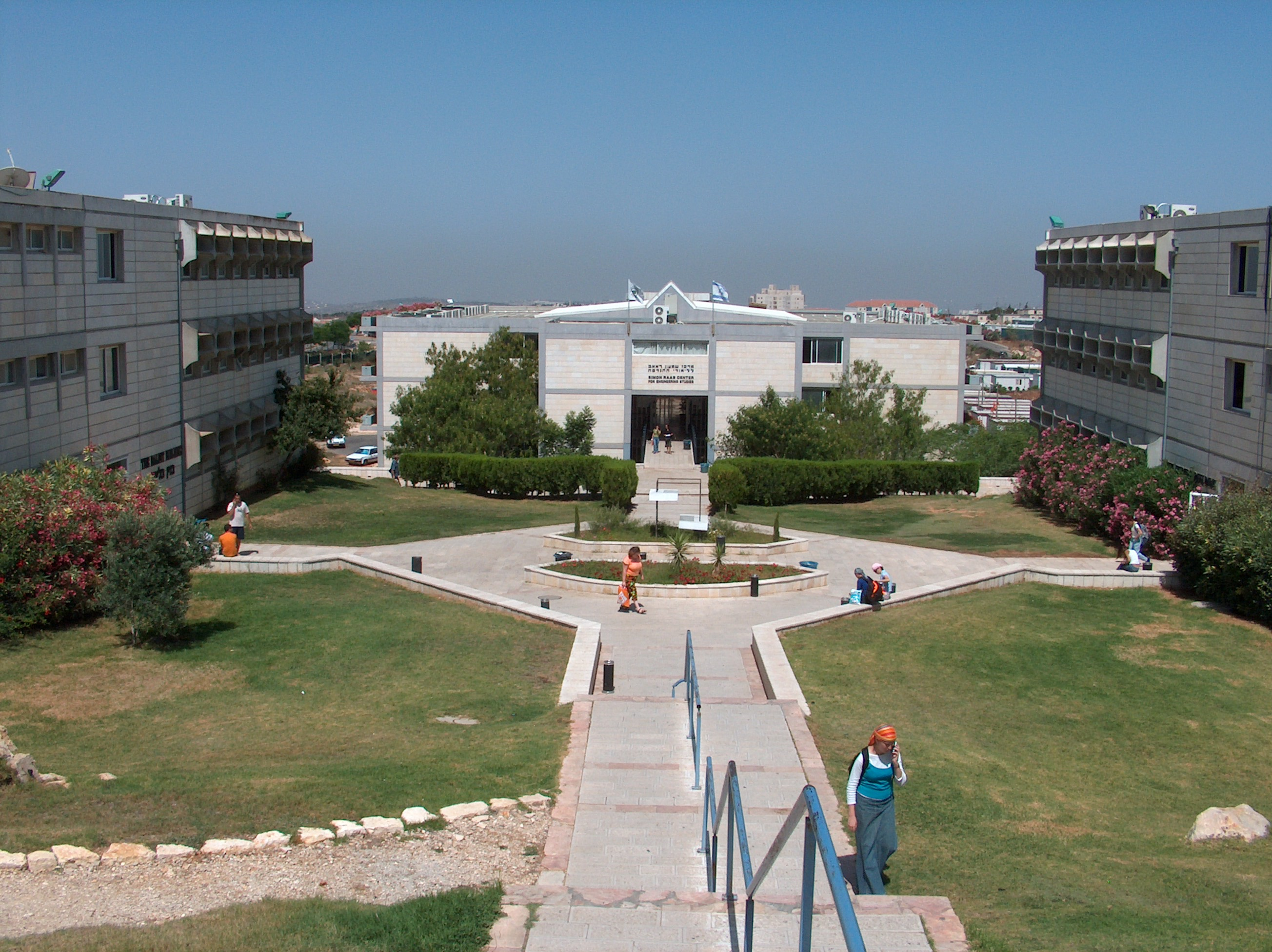
Ariel University

Ariel University, formerly the College of Judea and Samaria, is the major Israeli institution of higher education in the West Bank. With close to 13,000 students, it is Israel's largest public college. The college was accredited in 1994 and awards bachelor's degrees in arts, sciences, technology, architecture and physical therapy. On 17 July 2012, the Council for Higher Education in Judea and Samaria voted to grant the institution full university status.

Teacher training colleges include Herzog College in Alon Shvut and Orot Israel College in Elkana. Ohalo College is located in Katzrin, in the Golan Heights. Curricula at these institutions are overseen by the Council for Higher Education in Judea and Samaria (CHE-JS).

In March 2012, The Shomron Regional Council was awarded the Israeli Ministry of Education's first prize National Education Award in recognizing its excellence in investing substantial resources in the educational system. The Shomron Regional Council achieved the highest marks in all parameters (9.28 / 10). Gershon Mesika, the head of the regional council, declared that the award was a certificate of honour of its educators and the settlement youth who proved their quality and excellence.

== Strategic significance ==
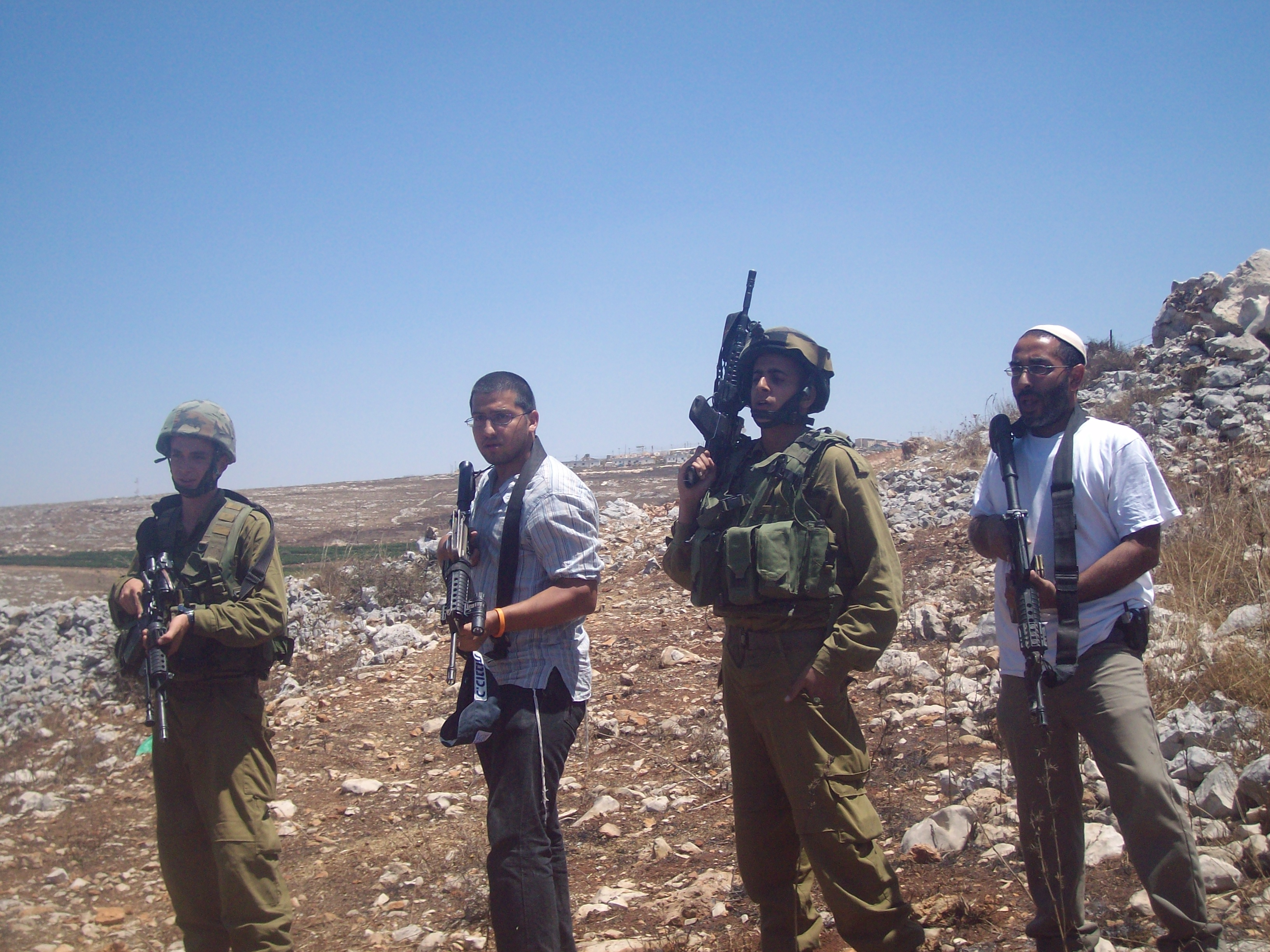
IDF soldiers and Israeli settlers, 2009

In 1983 an Israeli government plan entitled "Master Plan and Development Plan for Settlement in Samaria and Judea" envisaged placing a "maximally large Jewish population" in priority areas to accomplish incorporation of the West Bank in the Israeli "national system". According to Ariel Sharon, strategic settlement locations would work to preclude the formation of a Palestinian state.

Palestinians argue that the policy of settlements constitutes an effort to preempt or sabotage a peace treaty that includes Palestinian sovereignty, and claim that the presence of settlements harm the ability to have a viable and contiguous state. This was also the view of the Israeli Vice Prime Minister Haim Ramon in 2008, saying "the pressure to enlarge Ofra and other settlements does not stem from a housing shortage, but rather is an attempt to undermine any chance of reaching an agreement with the Palestinians ..."

The Israel Foreign Ministry asserts that some settlements are legitimate, as they took shape when there was no operative diplomatic arrangement, and thus they did not violate any agreement. Based on this, they assert that:

- Prior to the signing of the Egypt–Israel peace treaty, the eruption of the First Intifada, down to the signing of the Israel–Jordan peace treaty in 1994, Israeli governments on the left and right argued that the settlements were of strategic and tactical importance. The location of the settlements was primarily chosen based on the threat of an attack by the bordering hostile countries of Jordan, Syria, and Egypt and possible routes of advance into Israeli population areas. These settlements were seen as contributing to the security of Israel at a time when peace treaties had not been signed.

== Dismantling of settlements ==
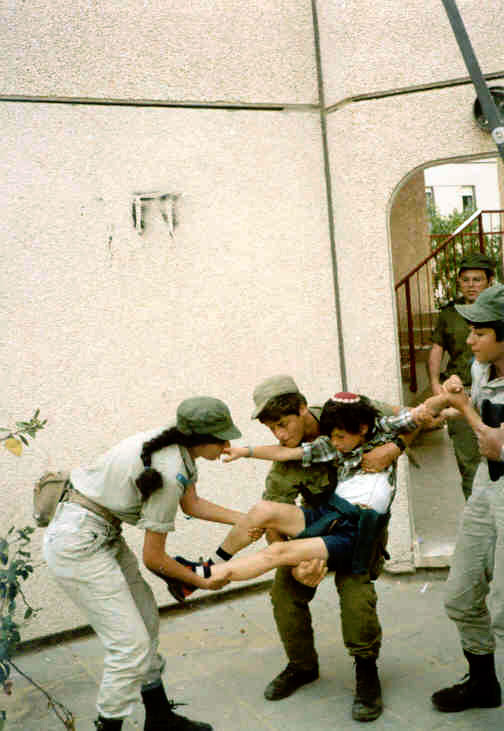
IDF soldiers evacuating Yamit, 1982

An early evacuation took place in 1982 as part of the Egypt–Israel peace treaty, when Israel was required to evacuate its settlers from the 18 Sinai settlements. Arab parties to the conflict had demanded the dismantlement of the settlements as a condition for peace with Israel. The evacuation was carried out with force in some instances, for example in Yamit. The settlements were demolished, as it was feared that settlers might try to return to their homes after the evacuation.

Israel's unilateral disengagement from the Gaza Strip took place in 2005. It involved the evacuation of settlements in the Gaza Strip and part of the West Bank, including all 21 settlements in Gaza and four in the West Bank, while retaining control over Gaza's borders, coastline, and airspace. Most of these settlements had existed since the early 1980s, some were over 30 years old; the total population involved was more than 8,000. There was significant opposition to the plan among parts of the Israeli public, and especially those living in the territories. George W. Bush said that a permanent peace deal would have to reflect "demographic realities" in the West Bank regarding Israel's settlements.

The Israeli human rights group GISHA maintains that despite the disengagement, Israel continues to occupy Gaza because it maintains its control over the area. For example, Israel maintains control over Gaza's airspace and waters, its borders (specifically, passage of goods and people to and from Gaza), the population registry, its telecommunications networks, and the collection of customs and tax on imports. GISHA also reports that Israel continues to control Gaza's infrastructure through its control over the supply of resources such as electricity. In addition, under the disengagement plan, Israel can prevent the PA from reopening its airport or seaport.

Within the former settlements, almost all buildings were demolished by Israel, with the exception of certain government and religious structures, which were completely emptied. Under an international arrangement, greenhouses were left to assist the Palestinian economy although half had been demolished by the settlers two months prior to the disengagement. The reduction in greenhouse space and increased restrictions on exports reduced the viability of the project. After the redeployment of Israeli troops to the Gaza border, 30% of the greenhouses suffered various degrees of damage due to Palestinian looters stealing, for example, hoses and irrigation equipment. Following the withdrawal, many of the former synagogues were torched and destroyed by Palestinians.

Some believe that settlements need not necessarily be dismantled and evacuated, even if Israel withdraws from the territory where they stand, as they can remain under Palestinian rule. These ideas have been expressed both by left-wing Israelis, and by Palestinians who advocate the two-state solution, and by extreme Israeli right-wingers and settlers who object to any dismantling and claim links to the land that are stronger than the political boundaries of the state of Israel.

The Israeli government has often threatened to dismantle outposts. Some have actually been dismantled, occasionally with use of force; this led to settler violence.

== Palestinian statehood bid of 2011 ==
American refusal to declare the settlements illegal was said to be the determining factor in the 2011 attempt to declare Palestinian statehood at the United Nations, the so-called Palestine 194 initiative.

Israel announced additional settlements in response to the Palestinian diplomatic initiative and Germany responded by moving to stop deliveries to Israel of submarines capable of carrying nuclear weapons.

Finally in 2012, several European states switched to either abstain or vote for statehood in response to continued settlement construction. Israel approved further settlements in response to the vote, which brought further worldwide condemnation.

== Impact on peace process ==
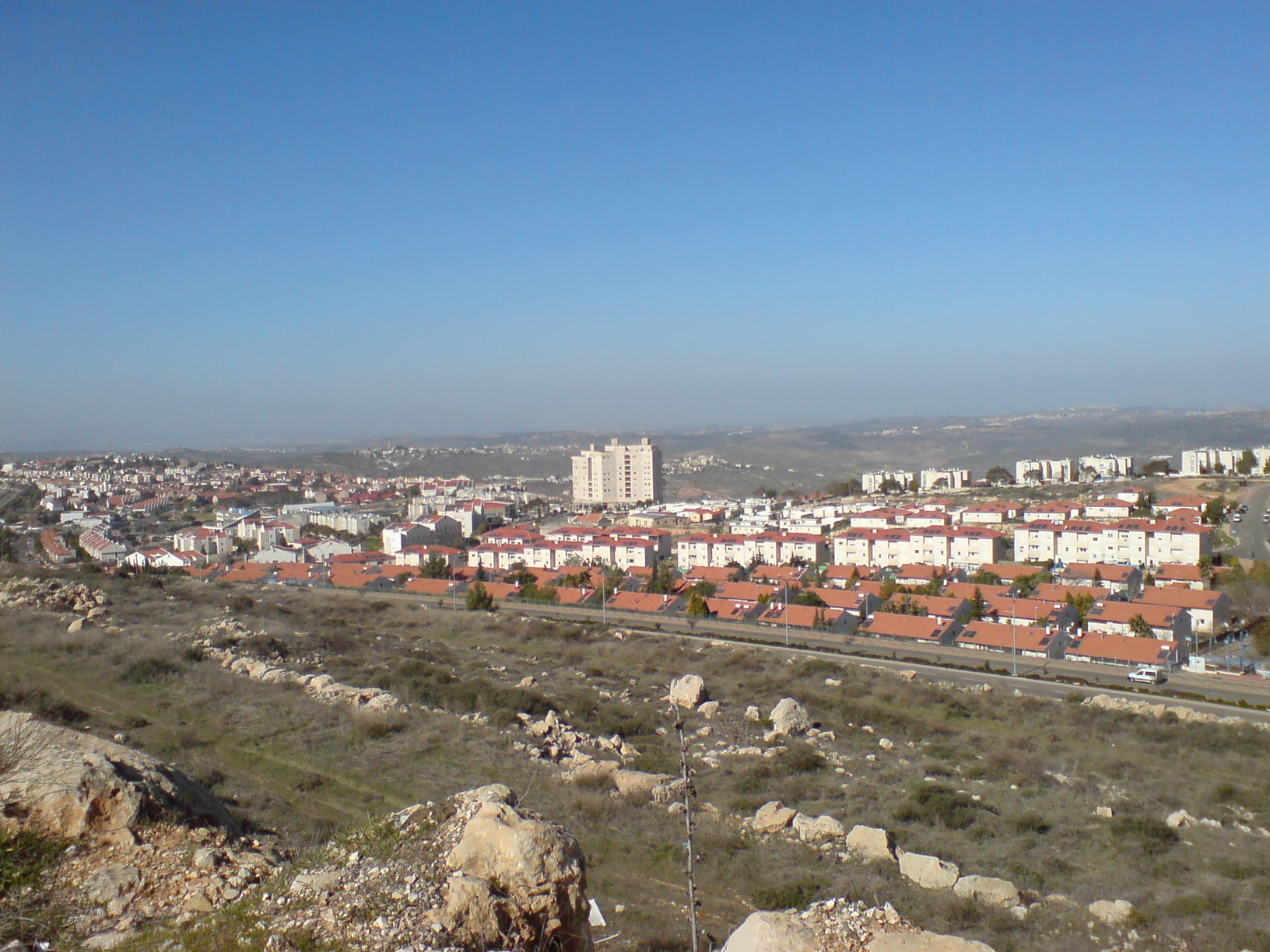
Ariel, one of the four biggest settlements in the West Bank

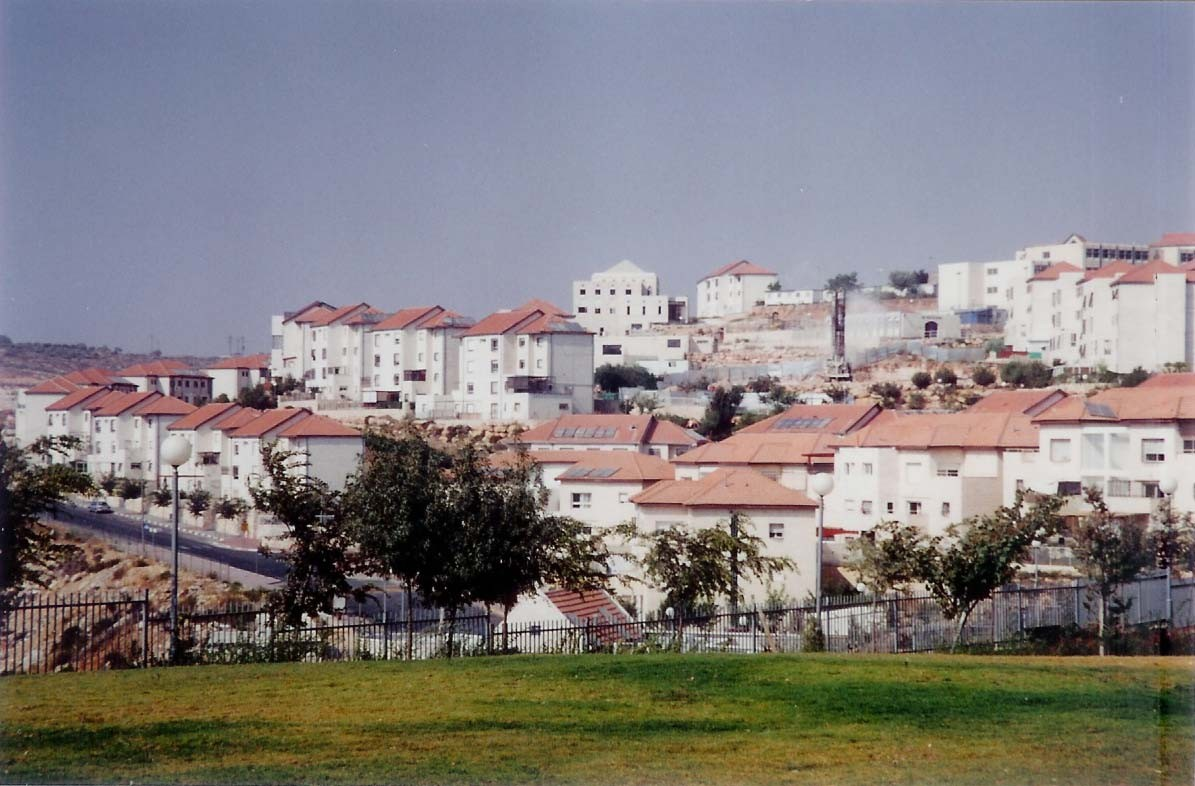
Betar Illit, one of the four biggest settlements in the West Bank

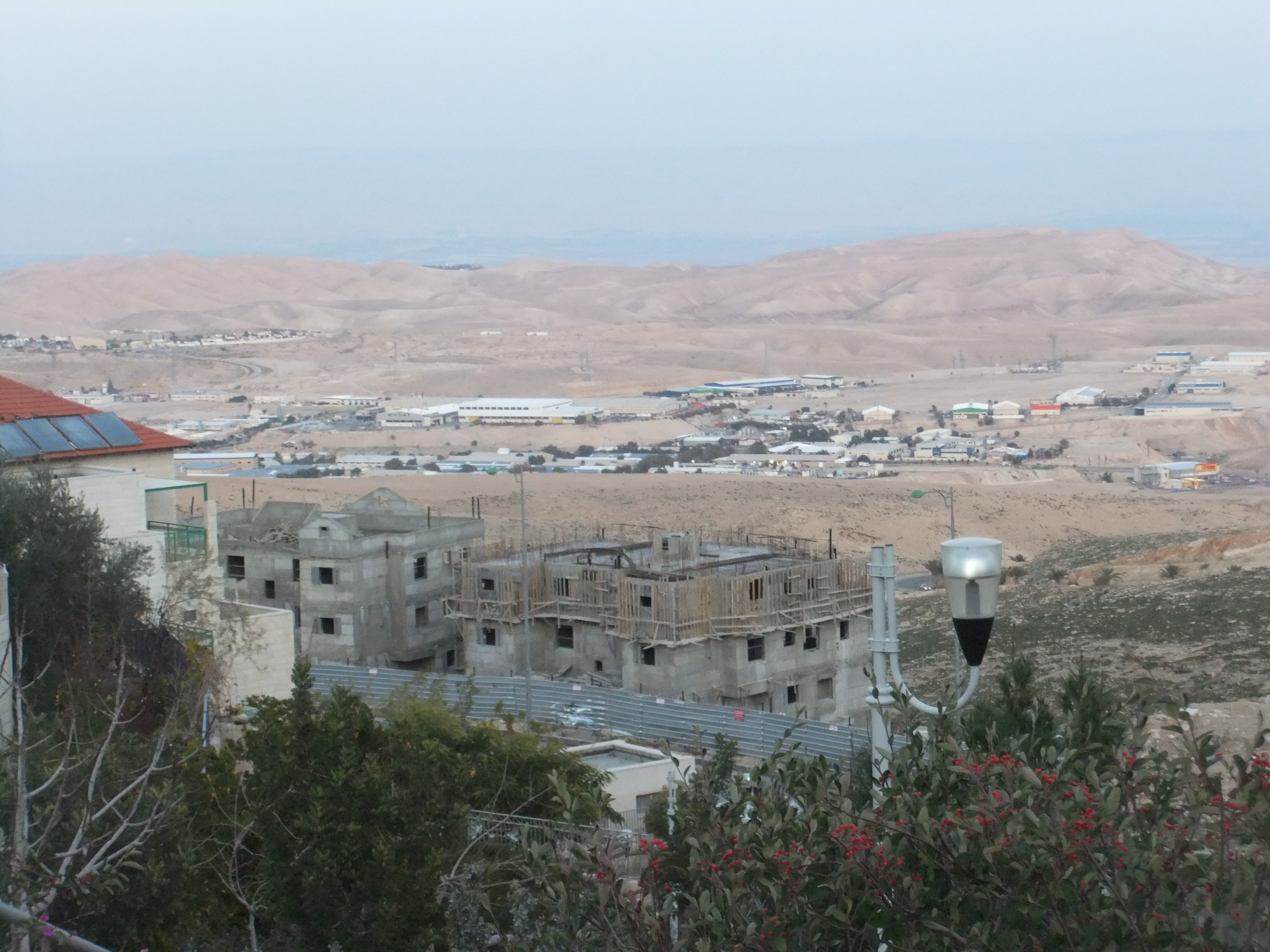
Ma'ale Adumim, one of the four biggest settlements in the West Bank, industrial area, 2012

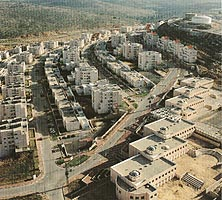
Modi'in Illit, one of the four biggest settlements in the West Bank

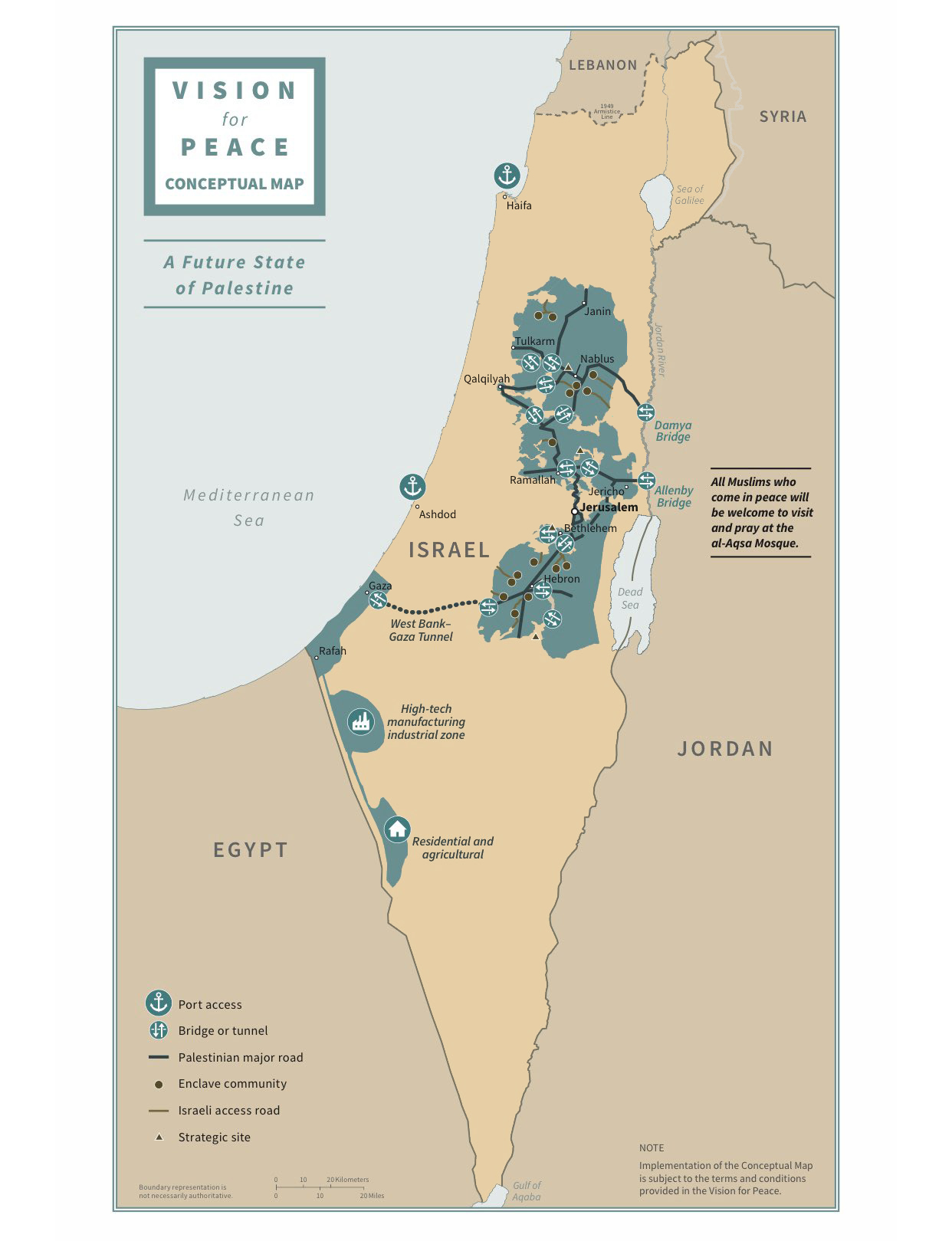
Trump's peace plan for the creation of the State of Palestine.

The settlements have been a source of tension between Israel and the U.S. Jimmy Carter regarded the settlements as illegal and tactically unwise. Ronald Reagan stated that they were legal but an obstacle to negotiations. In 1991, the U.S. delayed a subsidized loan to pressure Israel on the subject of settlement-building in the Jerusalem-Bethlehem corridor. In 2005, U.S. declared support for "the retention by Israel of major Israeli population centers as an outcome of negotiations," reflecting the statement by George W. Bush that a permanent peace treaty would have to reflect "demographic realities" in the West Bank. In June 2009, Barack Obama said that the United States "does not accept the legitimacy of continued Israeli settlements."

Palestinians claim that Israel has undermined the Oslo accords and peace process by continuing to expand the settlements. Settlements in the Sinai Peninsula were evacuated and razed in the wake of the peace agreement with Egypt. The 27 ministers of foreign affairs of the European Union published a report in May 2012 strongly denouncing policies of the State of Israel in the West Bank and finding that Israeli settlements in the West Bank are illegal and "threaten to make a two-state solution impossible." In the framework of the Oslo I Accord of 1993 between the Israeli government and the Palestine Liberation Organization (PLO), a modus vivendi was reached whereby both parties agreed to postpone a final solution on the destination of the settlements to the permanent status negotiations (Article V.3). Israel claims that settlements thereby were not prohibited, since there is no explicit interim provision prohibiting continued settlement construction, the agreement does register an undertaking by both sides, namely that "Neither side shall initiate or take any step that will change the status of the West Bank and the Gaza Strip pending the outcome of the permanent status negotiations" (Article XXX1 (7)), which has been interpreted as, not forbidding settlements, but imposing severe restrictions on new settlement building after that date. Melanie Jacques argued in this context that even 'agreements between Israel and the Palestinians which would allow settlements in the OPT, or simply tolerate them pending a settlement of the conflict, violate the Fourth Geneva Convention.'

Final status proposals have called for retaining long-established communities along the Green Line and transferring the same amount of land in Israel to the Palestinian state. The Clinton administration proposed that Israel keep some settlements in the West Bank, especially those in large blocs near the pre-1967 borders of Israel, with the Palestinians receiving concessions of land in other parts of the country. Both Clinton and Tony Blair pointed out the need for territorial and diplomatic compromise based on the validity of some of the claims of both sides.

As Minister of Defense, Ehud Barak approved a plan requiring security commitments in exchange for withdrawal from the West Bank. Barak also expressed readiness to cede parts of East Jerusalem and put the holy sites in the city under a "special regime."

On 14 June 2009, Israeli Prime Minister Benjamin Netanyahu, as an answer to U.S. President Barack Obama's speech in Cairo, delivered a speech setting out his principles for a Palestinian-Israeli peace, among others, he alleged "... we have no intention of building new settlements or of expropriating additional land for existing settlements." In March 2010, the Netanyahu government announced plans for building 1,600 housing units in Ramat Shlomo across the Green Line in East Jerusalem during U.S. Vice President Joe Biden's visit to Israel causing a diplomatic row.

On 6 September 2010, Jordanian King Abdullah II and Syrian President Bashar al-Assad said that Israel would need to withdraw from all of the lands occupied in 1967 in order to achieve peace with the Palestinians.

Bradley Burston has said that a negotiated or unilateral withdraw from most of the settlements in the West Bank is gaining traction in Israel.

In November 2010, the United States offered to "fight against efforts to delegitimize Israel" and provide extra arms to Israel in exchange for a continuation of the settlement freeze and a final peace agreement, but failed to come to an agreement with the Israelis on the exact terms.

In December 2010, the United States criticised efforts by the Palestinian Authority to impose borders for the two states through the United Nations rather than through direct negotiations between the two sides. In February 2011, it vetoed a draft resolution to condemn all Jewish settlements established in the occupied Palestinian territory since 1967 as illegal. The resolution, which was supported by all other Security Council members and co-sponsored by nearly 120 nations, would have demanded that "Israel, as the occupying power, immediately and completely ceases all settlement activities in the occupied Palestinian territory, including East Jerusalem and that it fully respect its legal obligations in this regard." The U.S. representative said that while it agreed that the settlements were illegal, the resolution would harm chances for negotiations. Israel's deputy Foreign Minister, Daniel Ayalon, said that the "UN serves as a rubber stamp for the Arab countries and, as such, the General Assembly has an automatic majority," and that the vote "proved that the United States is the only country capable of advancing the peace process and the only righteous one speaking the truth: that direct talks between Israel and the Palestinians are required." Palestinian negotiators, however, have refused to resume direct talks until Israel ceases all settlement activity.

In November 2009, Israeli Prime Minister Netanyahu issued a 10-month settlement freeze in the West Bank in an attempt to restart negotiations with the Palestinians. The freeze did not apply to building in Jerusalem in areas across the green line, housing already under construction and existing construction described as "essential for normal life in the settlements" such as synagogues, schools, kindergartens and public buildings. The Palestinians refused to negotiate without a complete halt to construction. In the face of pressure from the United States and most world powers supporting the demand by the Palestinian Authority that Israel desist from settlement project in 2010, Israel's ambassador to the UN Meron Reuben said Israel would only stop settlement construction after a peace agreement is concluded, and expressed concern were Arab countries to press for UN recognition of a Palestinian state before such an accord. He cited Israel's dismantlement of settlements in both the Sinai which took place after a peace agreement, and its unilateral dismantlement of settlements in the Gaza Strip. He presumed that settlements would stop being built were Palestinians to establish a state in a given area.

=== Proposals for land swap ===
The Clinton Parameters, a 2000 peace proposal by then U.S. President Bill Clinton, included a plan on which the Palestinian State was to include 94–96% of the West Bank, and around 80% of the settlers were to be under Israeli sovereignty, and in exchange for that, Israel will concede some territory (so called 'Territory Exchange' or 'Land Swap') within the Green Line (1967 borders). The swap would consist of 1–3% of Israeli territory, such that the final borders of the West Bank part of the Palestinian state would include 97% of the land of the original borders.

In 2010, Palestinian Authority President Mahmoud Abbas said that the Palestinians and Israel have agreed on the principle of a land swap. The issue of the ratio of land Israel would give to the Palestinians in exchange for keeping settlement blocs is an issue of dispute, with the Palestinians demanding that the ratio be 1:1, and Israel insisting that other factors be considered as well.

Under any peace deal with the Palestinians, Israel intends to keep the major settlement blocs close to its borders, which contain over 80% of the settlers. Prime Ministers Yitzhak Rabin, Ariel Sharon, and Benjamin Netanyahu have all stated Israel's intent to keep such blocs under any peace agreement. U.S. President George W. Bush acknowledged that such areas should be annexed to Israel in a 2004 letter to Prime Minister Sharon.

The European Union position is that any annexation of settlements should be done as part of mutually agreed land swaps, which would see the Palestinians controlling territory equivalent to the territory captured in 1967. The EU says that it will not recognise any changes to the 1967 borders without an agreement between the parties.

Israeli Foreign Minister Avigdor Lieberman has proposed a plan which would see settlement blocs annexed to Israel in exchange for heavily Arab areas inside Israel as part of a population exchange.

According to Mitchell G. Bard: "Ultimately, Israel may decide to unilaterally disengage from the West Bank and determine which settlements it will incorporate within the borders it delineates. Israel would prefer, however, to negotiate a peace treaty with the Palestinians that would specify which Jewish communities will remain intact within the mutually agreed border of Israel, and which will need to be evacuated. Israel will undoubtedly insist that some or all of the "consensus" blocs become part of Israel".

=== Proposal of dual citizenship ===
A number of proposals for the granting of Palestinian citizenship or residential permits to Jewish settlers in return for the removal of Israeli military installations from the West Bank have been fielded by such individuals as Arafat, Ibrahim Sarsur and Ahmed Qurei. In contrast, Mahmoud Abbas said in July 2013 that "In a final resolution, we would not see the presence of a single Israeli—civilian or soldier—on our lands."

Israeli Minister Moshe Ya'alon said in April 2010 that "just as Arabs live in Israel, so, too, should Jews be able to live in Palestine." ... "If we are talking about coexistence and peace, why the [Palestinian] insistence that the territory they receive be ethnically cleansed of Jews?".

The idea has been expressed by both advocates of the two-state solution and supporters of the settlers and conservative or fundamentalist currents in Israeli Judaism that, while objecting to any withdrawal, claim stronger links to the land than to the State of Israel.

== Settlement expansion ==
=== Pre Resolution 2334 ===
On 19 June 2011, Haaretz reported that the Israeli cabinet voted to revoke Defense Minister Ehud Barak's authority to veto new settlement construction in the West Bank, by transferring this authority from the Agriculture Ministry, headed by Barak ally Orit Noked, to the Prime Minister's office.

In 2009, newly elected Prime Minister Benjamin Netanyahu said: "I have no intention of building new settlements in the West Bank... But like all the governments there have been until now, I will have to meet the needs of natural growth in the population. I will not be able to choke the settlements." On 15 October 2009, he said the settlement row with the United States had been resolved.

In April 2012, four illegal outposts were retroactively legalized by the Israeli government. In June 2012, the Netanyahu government announced a plan to build 851 homes in five settlements: 300 units in Beit El and 551 units in other settlements.

Amid peace negotiations that showed little signs of progress, Israel issued on 3 November 2013, tenders for 1,700 new homes for Jewish settlers. The plots were offered in nine settlements in areas Israel says it intends to keep in any peace deal with the Palestinians. On 12 November, Peace Now revealed that the Construction and Housing Ministry had issued tenders for 24,000 more settler homes in the West Bank, including 4,000 in East Jerusalem. 2,500 units were planned in Ma'aleh Adumim, some 9,000 in the Gush Etzion Region, and circa 12,000 in the Binyamin Region, including 1,200 homes in the E1 area in addition to 3,000 homes in previously frozen E1 projects. Circa 15,000 homes of the 24,000 plan would be east of the West Bank Barrier and create the first new settlement blocs for two decades, and the first blocs ever outside the Barrier, far inside the West Bank.

As stated before, the Israeli government (as of 2015) has a program of residential subsidies in which Israeli settlers receive about double that given to Israelis in Tel Aviv and Jerusalem. As well, settlers in isolated areas receive three times the Israeli national average. From the beginning of 2009 to the end of 2013, the Israeli settlement population as a whole increased by a rate of over 4% per year. A New York Times article in 2015 stated that said building had been "at the heart of mounting European criticism of Israel."

=== Resolution 2334 and quarterly reports ===
United Nations Security Council Resolution 2334 "Requests the Secretary-General to report to the Council every three months on the implementation of the provisions of the present resolution;" In the first of these reports, delivered verbally at a security council meeting on 24 March 2017, United Nations Special Coordinator for the Middle East Peace Process, Nickolay Mladenov, noted that Resolution 2334 called on Israel to take steps to cease all settlement activity in the Occupied Palestinian Territory, that "no such steps have been taken during the reporting period" and that instead, there had been a marked increase in statements, announcements and decisions related to construction and expansion.

=== Regularization and outpost method ===
The 2017 Settlement Regularization in "Judea and Samaria" Law permits backdated legalization of outposts constructed on private Palestinian land. Following a petition challenging its legality, on June 9, 2020, Israel's Supreme Court struck down the law that had retroactively legalized about 4,000 settler homes built on privately owned Palestinian land. The Israeli Attorney General has stated that existing laws already allow legalization of Israeli constructions on private Palestinian land in the West Bank. The Israeli Attorney General, Avichai Mandelblit, has updated the High Court on his official approval of the use of a legal tactic permitting the de facto legalization of roughly 2,000 illegally built Israeli homes throughout the West Bank. (Note: The Regularization law, opposed by Mandelblit, would allow the state to expropriate private Palestinian land where some 4,000 illegal settler homes have been built, provided that they were established "in good faith" or had government support, and that the Palestinian owners receive 125 percent financial compensation for the land.) The legal mechanism is known as "market regulation" and relies on the notion that wildcat Israeli homes built on private Palestinian land were done so in good faith.

In a report of 22 July 2019, PeaceNow notes that after a gap of 6 years when there were no new outposts, establishment of new outposts recommenced in 2012, with 32 of the current 126 outposts set up to date. 2 outposts were subject to eviction, 15 were legalized and at least 35 are in process of legalization.

=== Updates and related matters ===
The Israeli government announced in 2019 that it has made monetary grants available for the construction of hotels in Area C of the West Bank.

According to Peace Now, approvals for building in Israeli settlements in East Jerusalem expanded by 60% between 2017, when Donald Trump became US president, and 2019.

On 9 July 2021, Michael Lynk, U.N. special rapporteur on human rights in the occupied Palestinian territory, addressing a session of the UN Human Rights Council in Geneva, said "I conclude that the Israeli settlements do amount to a war crime," and "I submit to you that this finding compels the international community...to make it clear to Israel that its illegal occupation, and its defiance of international law and international opinion, can and will no longer be cost-free." Israel, which does not recognize Lynk's mandate, boycotted the session.

A new Israeli government, formed on 13 June 2021, declared a "status quo" in the settlements policy. According to Peace Now, as of 28 October this has not been the case. On October 24, 2021, tenders were published for 1,355 housing units plus another 83 in Givat HaMatos and on 27 October 2021, approval was given for 3,000 housing units including in settlements deep inside the West Bank. These developments were condemned by the U.S. as well as by the United Kingdom, Russia and 12 European countries. while UN experts, Michael Lynk, Special Rapporteur on the situation of human rights in the Palestinian Territory occupied since 1967 and Mr. Balakrishnan Rajagopal (United States of America), UN Special Rapporteur on adequate housing said that settlement expansion should be treated as a "presumptive war crime".

In February 2023, the new Israeli government under Benjamin Netanyahu approved the legalization of nine illegal settler outposts in the West Bank. Finance Minister Bezalel Smotrich took charge of most of the Civil Administration, obtaining broad authority over civilian issues in the West Bank. In March 2023, Netanyahu's government repealed a 2005 law whereby four Israeli settlements, Homesh, Sa-Nur, Ganim and Kadim, were dismantled as part of the Israeli disengagement from Gaza. In June 2023, Israel shortened the procedure of approving settlement construction and gave Finance Minister Smotrich the authority to approve one of the stages, changing the system operating for the last 27 years. In its first six months, construction of 13,000 housing units in settlements, almost triple the amount advanced in the whole of 2022.

In December 2025, the security cabinet of Israel sanctioned the establishment of 19 settlements in the occupied West Bank. Palestinian authorities assert that this initiative "intensifies years of land appropriation and demographic manipulation." According to Ynet, the United States is currently working on executing the plan.

In February 2026, Israel's Security Cabinet approved a series of measures expanding Israeli administrative and enforcement authority in the occupied West Bank, including easing restrictions on land purchases by Israeli settlers and opening land registries previously closed to Israelis. Palestinian officials and several Arab states condemned the decision as de-facto annexation and a violation of international law, while the Israeli government said the measures were intended to improve governance and security.

In response to the February 2026 measures, nineteen Arab and Islamic countries and several European states, together with the League of Arab States and the Organisation of Islamic Cooperation, issued a joint statement condemning the expansion of settlement-related policies. The signatories described the measures as violations of international law and said continued settlement activity undermines efforts toward regional stability and a two-state solution. They called on the Israeli government to reverse the measures and comply with its international obligations.

In 2026, the Israeli security cabinet secretly approved the legalization of more than 30 previously unauthorized settler outposts and farms in the occupied West Bank, according to Israeli sources cited by CNN. The move also reportedly includes plans for infrastructure such as electricity and water supply for these sites. It has been criticized by the Palestinian Authority and rights groups, including Peace Now, as further entrenching settlement expansion and harming prospects for peace.

Separately, Israeli authorities approved a plan to register large areas of land in Area C of the West Bank as state property, according to Al Jazeera. The proposal, put forward by ministers including Bezalel Smotrich, has been criticized by Palestinian officials and human rights groups. Palestinians would be required to provide documentation to prove ownership, which critics say is often difficult due to the long-standing occupation and the absence of formal land registration in many areas.

Also, Israeli National Security Minister Itamar Ben-Gvir has said the government intends to encourage migration from Gaza and the occupied West Bank and expand settlement activity, and has also referred to potential future settlement activity in southern Lebanon. According to TRT World, he made the comments during a public event in Jerusalem, amid ongoing political controversy over Israel's settlement policies.

In June 2026, the Israeli cabinet advanced a proposal to allocate approximately 1 billion shekels ($340–350 million) for infrastructure and development projects in 61 settlements in the occupied West Bank. The plan, promoted by Finance Minister Bezalel Smotrich, included funding for roads, water and sewage systems, land preparation, public facilities, and temporary residential compounds. The cabinet approved the budget framework and referred the proposal to the security cabinet.

== See also ==
- Israeli settlement timeline
- Jewish land purchase in Palestine
- List of Israeli settlements
- Neo-Zionism
- Palestinian Land Law
- Population statistics for Israeli West Bank settlements
- Proposed Israeli annexation of the West Bank
- State of Judea
- Development town
- Unrecognized Bedouin villages in Israel
- Kibbutz

== Notes ==
i.
Statistics for the West Bank ("Judea and Samaria") from the Statistical Abstract of Israel 2013 No. 64.
- 2.16 Localities and Population, by District, Sub-District, Religion and Population Group
  - Total population = 341,400 in 123 "Jewish localities"
  - Jews = 334,200 in 123 "Jewish localities"
  - Arabs = 0 in 0 "Non-Jewish localities"
