= Israeli occupation of the Sinai Peninsula =

Sinai's 1956–1957 and 1967–1982 occupations

- Part of the Arab–Israeli conflict, the Suez Crisis, the Six-Day War, and the Yom Kippur War
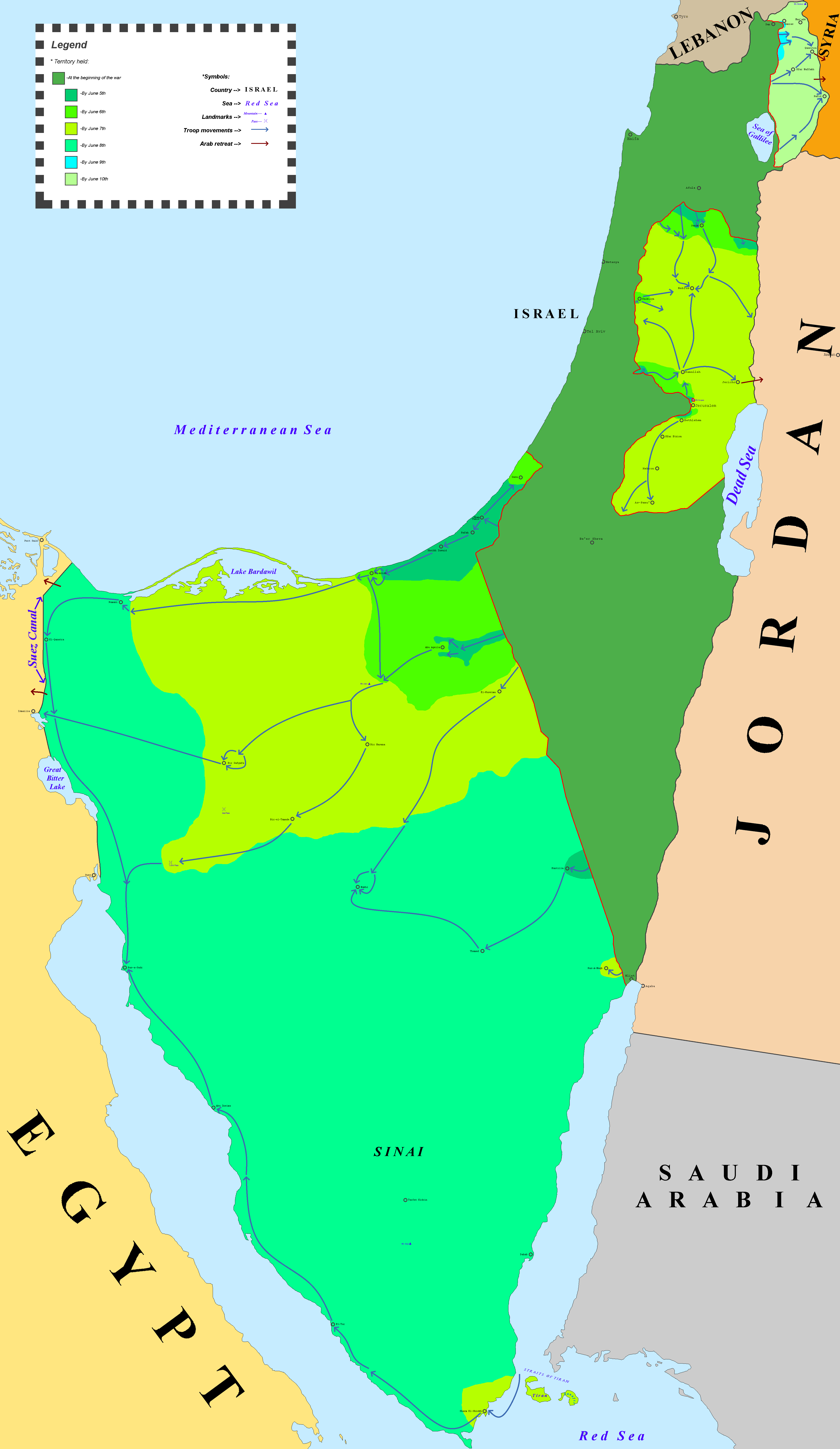
- Territories occupied by Israel after the Six-Day War, 1967
- Date: 29 October 1956 – 7 March 1957 (first occupation); 5 June 1967 – 25 April 1982 (second occupation)
- Location: Sinai Peninsula, Egypt
- Type: Military occupation
- Motive: Thwarting the Egyptian-led blockade of Israel (1949–1967)
- Outcome: Egypt–Israel peace treaty
- Verdict: February 1957: Israel agrees to withdraw from Sinai in exchange for the deployment of the United Nations Emergency Force on the Egyptian side of the border; October 1973: Egyptian forces temporarily occupy the eastern bank of the Suez Canal, with the exception of the Israeli crossing point near the Deversoir Air Base; Israeli forces subsequently counterattack and encircle an Egyptian pocket around Suez City; March 1979: Egypt recognizes Israeli sovereignty, terminates the blockade of Israel, and agrees to demilitarize along Israel's border; April 1982: Israel fully returns the Sinai Peninsula to Egypt, but retains control of Taba until 19 March 1989
- Executed by: Israel

The Sinai Peninsula, which is a part of Egypt, has been militarily occupied by Israel twice since the beginning of the Arab–Israeli conflict: the first occupation lasted from October 1956 to March 1957, and the second occupation lasted from June 1967 to April 1982. Taba, Egypt, the only territory which was not returned in 1982, was returned to Egypt in 1989.

Israel initially seized the Sinai Peninsula during the Suez Crisis, when it, along with France and the United Kingdom, attacked Egypt in response to its blockade of Israeli passage through the Suez Canal and Straits of Tiran and the nationalisation of the canal; the Egyptians had been contesting Israel's freedom of navigation through there since 1949, impacting the country's ability to import and export goods during the Israeli austerity period. Although the occupation allowed Israel to re-open the Straits of Tiran, the Suez Canal was closed until 1957, when Israeli troops withdrew from Egypt due to international pressure.

In the mid-1960s, amidst warnings from Israeli officials that another blockade would be a casus belli, Egypt re-imposed the blockade against Israel and subsequently lost the Sinai Peninsula and the Egyptian-occupied Gaza Strip in the 1967 Arab–Israeli War. Like before, Israel's occupation allowed it to re-open the Straits of Tiran, but, once again, the Suez Canal was closed until 1975. For the next three years, Egypt, seeking to regain the territory it had lost, launched the unsuccessful War of Attrition against Israel in 1967, lasting until 1970. Later, a large-scale Egyptian military offensive against Israel, known as Operation Badr, triggered the 1973 Arab–Israeli War, which ended with Egypt holding most of the east bank of the Suez. By 1979, the United States had successfully negotiated the Egypt–Israel peace treaty: the Egyptians recognized Israel as a sovereign state, recognized the Straits of Tiran and the Gulf of Aqaba as international waterways, and agreed to heavily demilitarize the entire Sinai. In exchange, Israel agreed to withdraw all civilians and soldiers from the Sinai Peninsula and return it to Egypt. On 25 April 1982, Israel's withdrawal concluded and Egypt has since left the Sinai Peninsula heavily demilitarized, marking the first instance of peace between Israel and an Arab country.

Between 1967 and 1982, a total of 18 Israeli settlements were constructed throughout the Sinai Peninsula, primarily along the Gulf of Aqaba and in the areas to the south of the formerly Egyptian-occupied Gaza Strip. Additionally, Israel dismantled two bases of the Israeli Air Force, one base of the Israeli Navy, and a number of other government/military installations, including most Israeli-controlled oil resources.

== Background ==
=== Suez Crisis (1956) ===
To assert national sovereignty and to generate revenue for the Egyptian government, Egyptian President Gamal Abdel Nasser nationalised the Suez Canal, subsequently ceasing Anglo-French control over the Suez Canal and turning over control to the Egyptian government. It also resulted in the creation of the Egyptian state-owned Suez Canal Authority to maintain the Suez Canal. The Egyptian government took a step forward and blocked the Straits of Tiran to only Israeli-flagged ships as well, initiating a blockade against Israel. In response, France, the United Kingdom, and Israel held a secret meeting, creating plans to invade and seize the Sinai Peninsula from Egypt.

On 29 October 1956, the Israel Defense Forces (IDF) launched Operation Kadesh, initiating their invasion of the Egyptian Sinai Peninsula and Egyptian-administered Gaza Strip, initiating the Suez Crisis. In early November, British and French forces landed in Port Said and Port Fuad, backing up the Israeli forces. This resulted in Egypt closing the Suez Canal and losing the Sinai and the Gaza Strip to the coalition. After the successful invasion, France, the United Kingdom, and Israel faced significant international pressure, particularly from the United States, thus resulting France and the United Kingdom in withdrawing from the Sinai in December 1956. Under negotiations, Egypt eventually agreed to deploy the United Nations Emergency Force (UNEF) near the Egypt-Israel border and Gaza, guaranteeing Israeli rights to once again use the Straits of Tiran for shipping and Israel withdrew in March 1957 in return and Egypt re-opened the Suez Canal. France and the United Kingdom's influence in the Middle East significantly dropped after the conclusion of the Suez Crisis.

=== Six-Day War through Israeli withdrawal (1967–1982) ===
In May 1967, Egyptian President Gamal Abdel Nasser ordered the withdrawal of the UNEF and moved Egypt's own troops into the area. On 5 June 1967, Israel, believing war to be imminent, ultimately launched a preemptive strike against Egypt, beginning the Six-Day War. Israel also struck Syria and Jordan. Within three days, Israel had occupied most of the Sinai Peninsula and even the Gaza Strip. In the conclusion of the Six-Day War, Israel occupied the entirety of the Sinai and the Gaza from Egypt, the West Bank from Jordan, and the Golan Heights from Syria.

==== War of Attrition ====
Following the war, Egypt launched the War of Attrition (1967–1970) aimed at forcing Israel to withdraw from the Sinai Peninsula. The war saw protracted conflict in the Suez Canal Zone, ranging from limited to large scale combat. Israeli shelling of the cities of Port Said, Ismailia, and Suez on the west bank of the canal, led to high civilian casualties (including the virtual destruction of Suez), and contributed to the flight of 700,000 Egyptian internal refugees. Ultimately, the war concluded in 1970 with no change in the front line.

==== Yom Kippur War ====
On 6 October 1973, Egypt commenced Operation Badr to retake the Sinai Peninsula, while Syria launched a simultaneous operation to retake the Golan Heights with was also lost to Israel in the 1967 war, thereby beginning the Yom Kippur War (known in Egypt and much of Europe as the October War).

==== Peace treaty and Israeli withdrawal ====
The canal was reopened in 1975, with Egyptian President Anwar Sadat leading the first convoy through the canal aboard an Egyptian destroyer. In 1979, Egypt and Israel signed a peace treaty in which Israel agreed to withdraw from the entirety of the Sinai Peninsula. Israel subsequently withdrew in several stages, ending on 26 April 1982.

== Israeli settlements ==
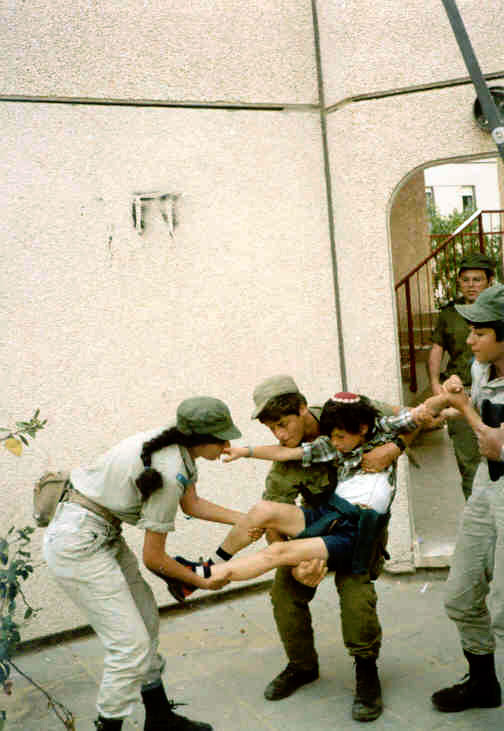
Israeli authorities evacuating Yamit by force, April 1982

Israeli settlements in the Sinai Peninsula were split into two regions: one along the Mediterranean coast, and another along the Gulf of Aqaba. Israel had plans to expand the settlement of Yamit into a city of up to 200,000 residents. The actual population of Yamit never exceeded 3,000. The settlements in the Yamit region were demolished by Israel prior to the withdrawal, but the settlements on the Gulf: Ofira (Sharm El Sheikh), Di Zahav (Dahab), and Neviot (Nuweiba) remained intact, and were further developed by Egypt after the withdrawal.

The settlements in the Yamit region included Yamit, Avshalom, Netiv HaAsara, Holit, Dikla, Pri'el, Sufa, and Talmei Yosef. The settlements along the Gulf of Aqaba included Di Zahav, Neviot, Ofira, and Aviya-Sonesta Beach Hotel.

== International views and legality ==
Following the 1967 Six-Day War, the United Nations Security Council adopted UNSC 242, which emphasized the "inadmissibility of the acquisition of territory by war" and called for Israeli withdrawal from territories occupied in the war, including the Sinai Peninsula. While the use of existing state-owned oil wells in Sinai by Israel as a belligerent occupier was not legally contested, the exploration and exploitation of new oil wells was considered illegal.

== See also ==
- Closure of the Suez Canal (1967–1975)
