= Field school (Israel) =

In Israel, field schools are institutions primarily aimed at providing accommodation and guidance services for various tourists. There are twelve field schools across the country in proximity to nature reserves. Their locations range from Mount Hermon in the north to Eilat in the south.

All but two are managed by the Society for the Protection of Nature in Israel (SPNI). The two exceptions are the field schools at Kfar Etzion and the Sha'ar HaGai Field School in Moshav Beit Meir.

== History ==
The first field school in Israel was established in Ein Gedi in 1960, and in 1963 the second field school was established in Sde Boker. By 1966, there were seven field schools in Israel: Ein Gedi, Sde Boker, Eilat, Hof HaCarmel, Mount Meron, Western Galilee, and Moshav Bar Giora. Field schools were also established during the 1970s in Sharm El-Sheikh, Yamit, and Saint Catherine, while Israel occupied the Sinai Peninsula. Those schools closed in 1981 when Israel withdrew from the Sinai Peninsula as part of the Egypt–Israel peace treaty. In 1975, a field school was established in Ofra.

== Activity ==
Field schools are located in the heart of Israel’s natural landscapes, in key locations with unique scenery and close proximity to popular and interesting hiking trails. The Society for the Protection of Nature in Israel (SPNI) guides, both young and experienced, are based in these field schools, deeply connected to the environment and its dynamics, and accompany hikers along the area's trails and landscapes.

Each year, thousands of visitors stay at field schools, including families, school students, young adults, and older individuals, benefiting from guided tours led by specialists in their fields and regions.

Some of the annual high school trips in Israel, organized as part of outdoor education classes (Shelach), which span several days and require lodging and guiding services, utilize field schools for these purposes. Field schools also serve as educational centers for university field courses and as guidance hubs for hikers. In some field schools, youth clubs and activities are also held.

== Locations ==
List is sorted from north to south

- Hermon field school
- Golan field school
- Achziv field school
- Mt. Meron field school
- Alon Hatavor field school
- Carmel field school
- Ofra field school
- Sha'ar HaGai field school – not affiliated with the Society for the Protection of Nature in Israel
- Kfar Etzion field school – not affiliated with the Society for the Protection of Nature in Israel
- Shekamim field school
- Sde Boker field school
- Hazeva field school
- Har Hanegev field school
- Ein Gedi field school
- Eilat field school
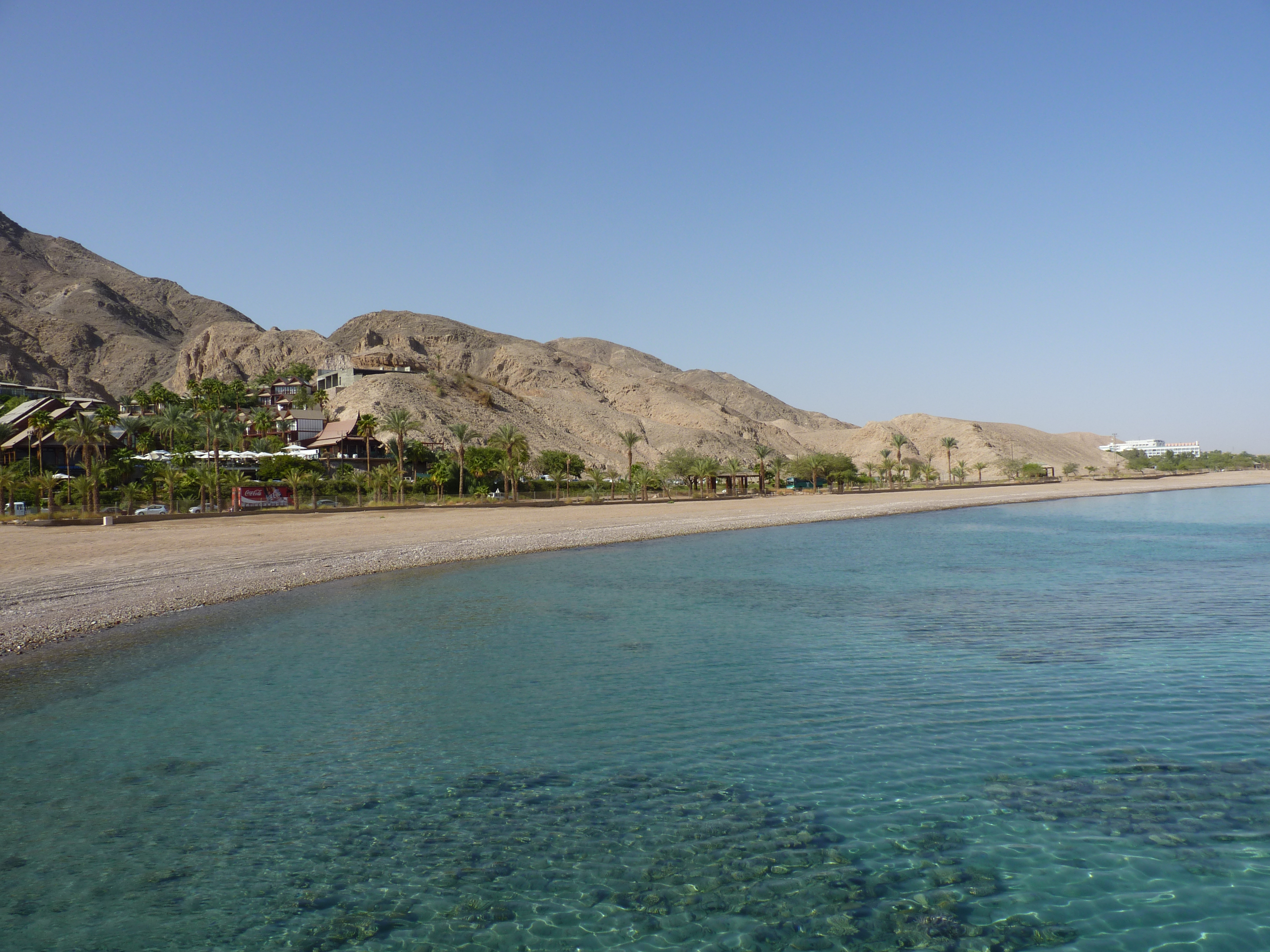
Eilat field school

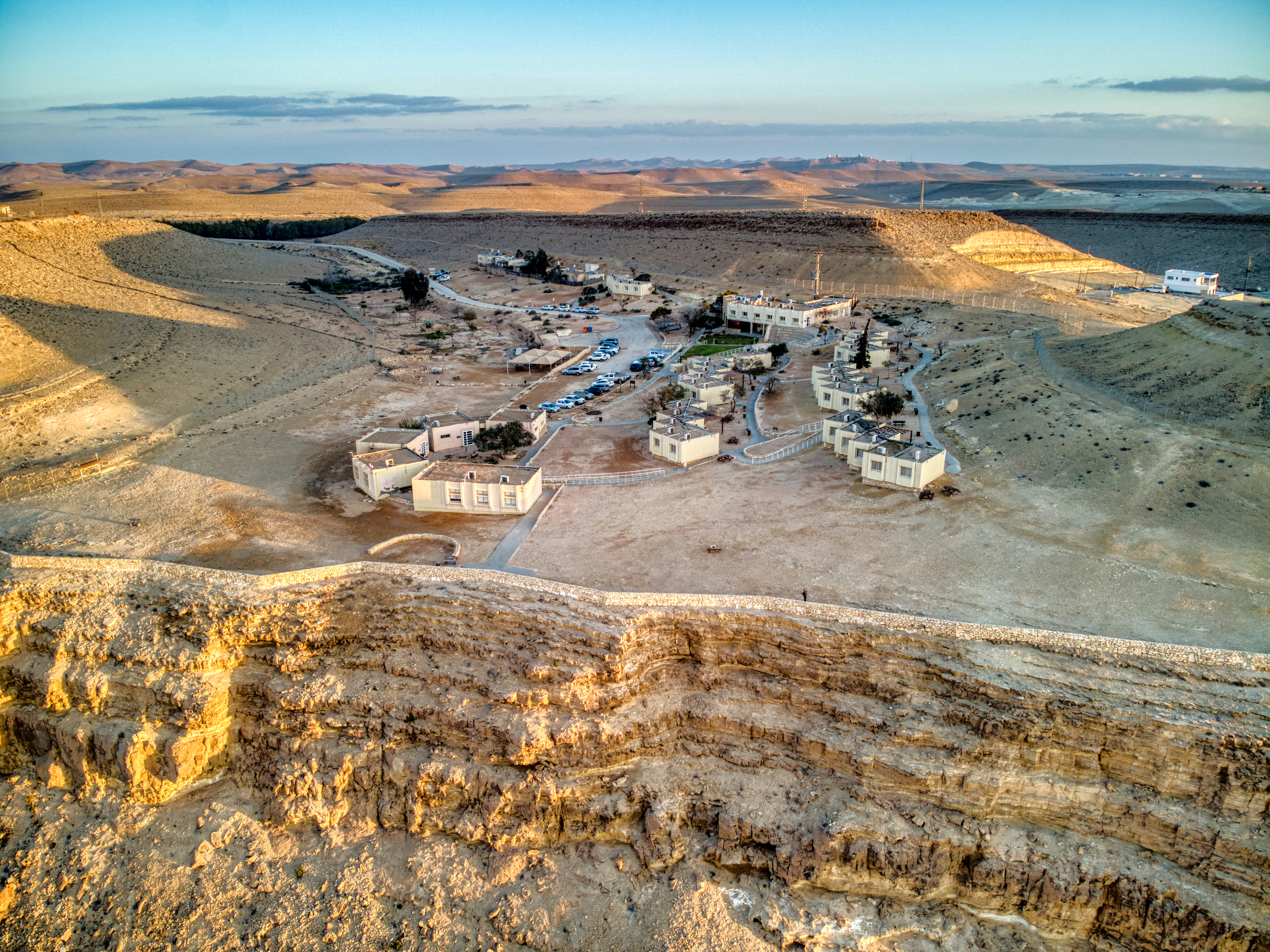
Har Hanegev field school

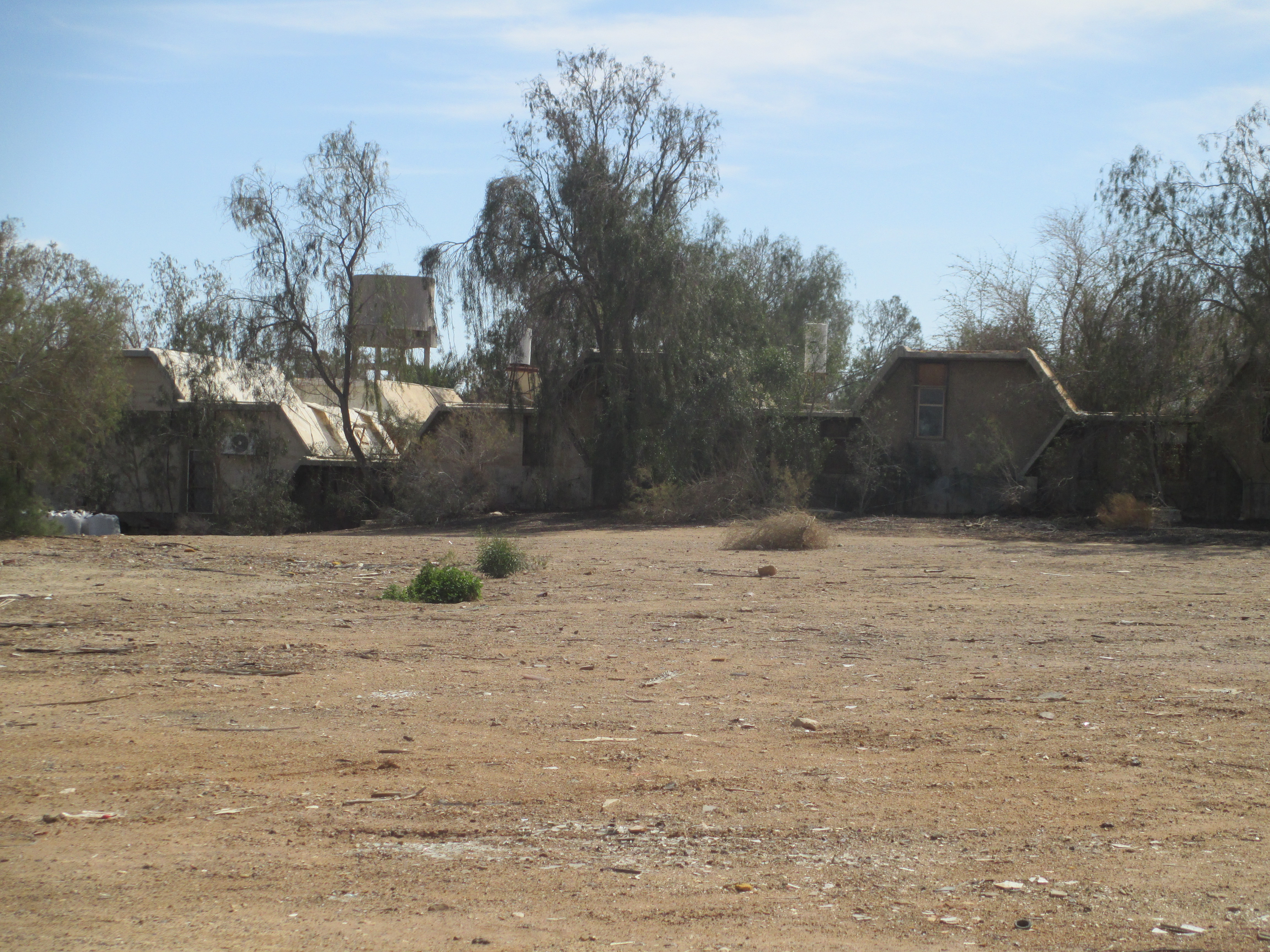
Hazeva field school

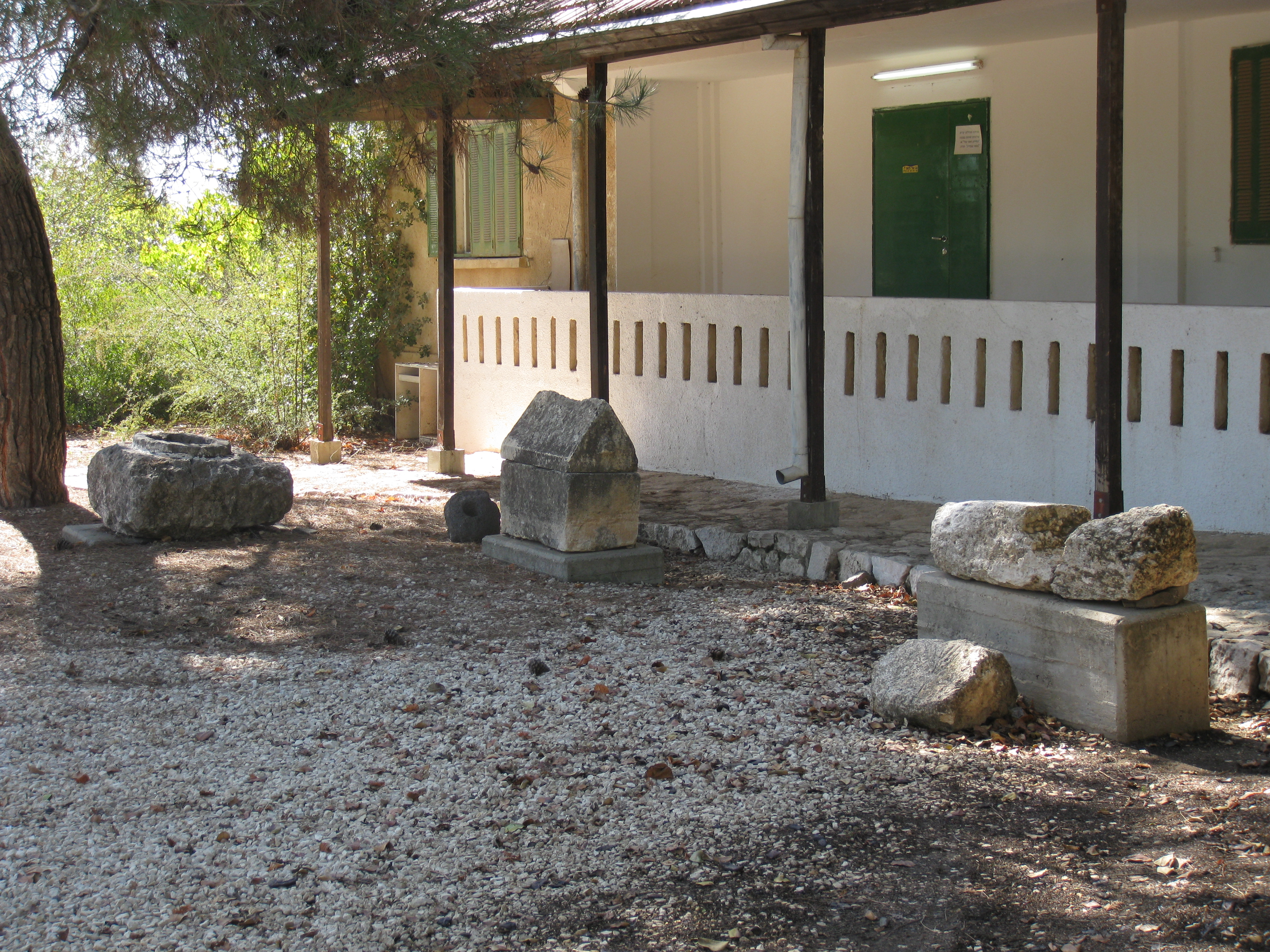
Kfar Etzion field school

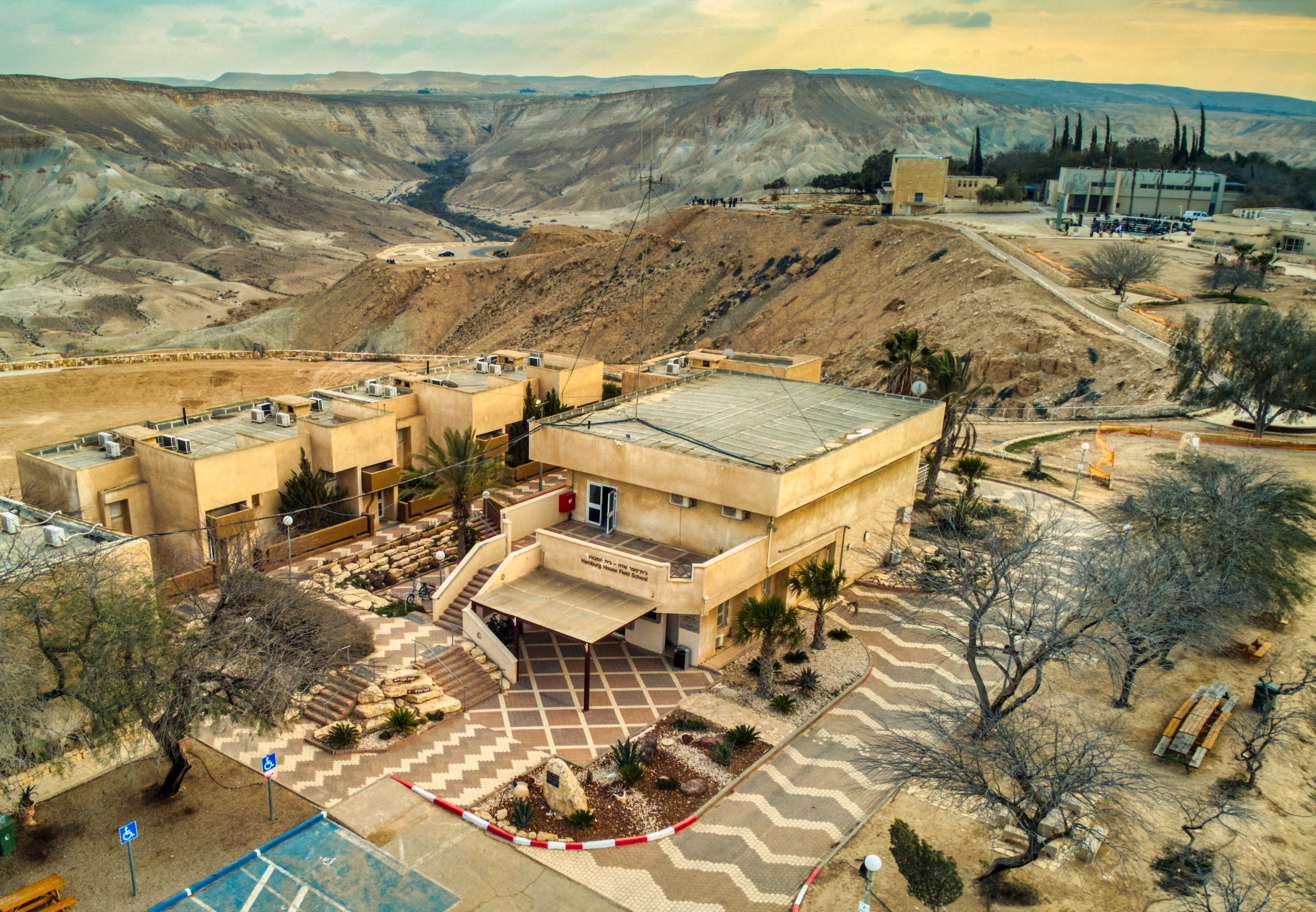
Sde Boker field school
