= Closure of the Suez Canal =

Closure of the Suez Canal may refer to:

- Closure of the Suez Canal (1956–1957)
- Closure of the Suez Canal (1967–1975)
