= Israeli passage through the Suez Canal and Straits of Tiran =

Aspect of the Arab–Israeli conflict (with Egypt)

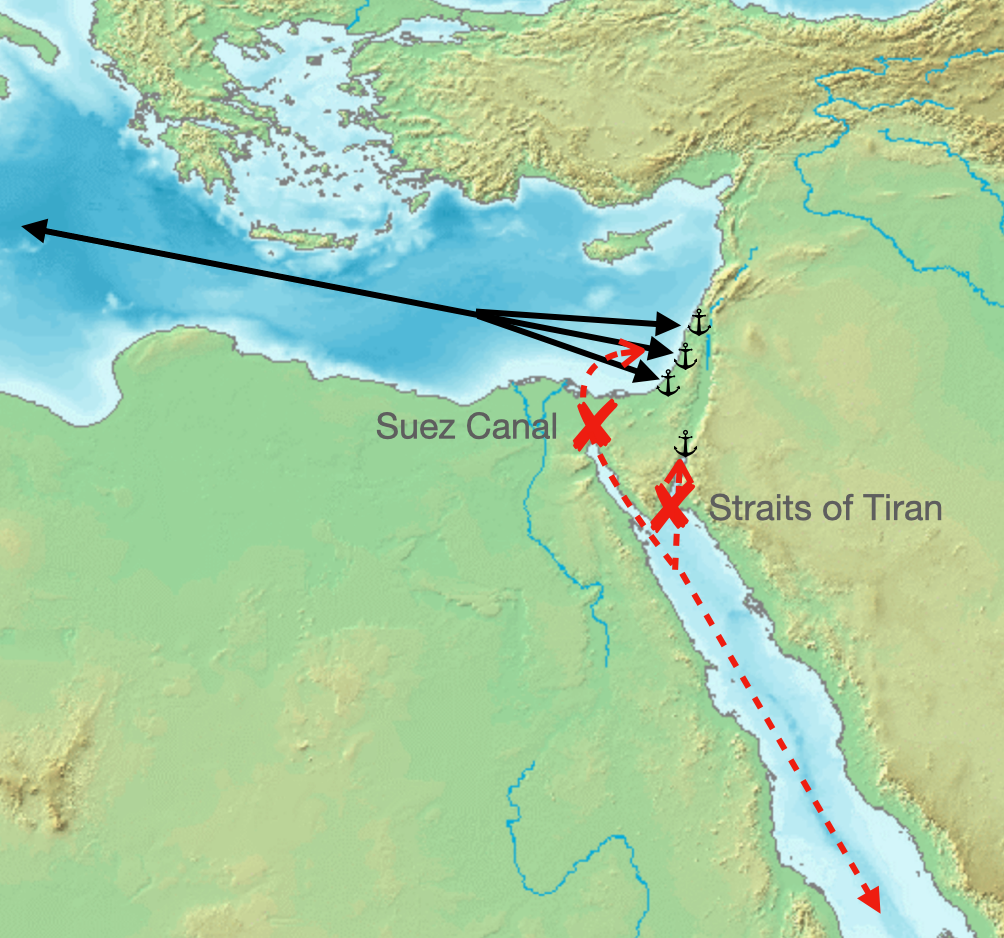
Diagram of Egypt's blockade of Israeli passage through the Suez Canal and Straits of Tiran between the 1949 Armistice Agreements and the 1967 Arab–Israeli War (briefly interrupted by the 1956 Suez Crisis), when Israel occupied the Sinai Peninsula.

Israeli passage through the Suez Canal and Straits of Tiran was restricted by Egypt, in cooperation with Saudi Arabia, for much of the time between the 1948 Arab–Israeli War and the 1967 Six-Day War. Since the Egypt–Israel peace treaty of 1979, Israel has enjoyed freedom of navigation through the Suez Canal and the Straits of Tiran.

Egypt was one of the main Arab countries that invaded Israel after the Israeli Declaration of Independence, sparking the 1948 Arab–Israeli War. Although the Egyptians were defeated during this conflict, they managed to occupy what would become known as the Gaza Strip and did not recognize Israel as a sovereign state following the 1949 Armistice Agreements. The ceasefire between the two countries was being tested by the Egypt-based Palestinian Fedayeen insurgency, which was prompting Israeli reprisal operations. Egypt had closed the Suez Canal and the Straits of Tiran to all Israeli vessels in 1949, preventing imports and exports amidst Israel's austerity period. Tensions worsened as the Egyptians gradually strengthened their blockade of Israel, culminating in the Suez Crisis of 1956, during which Israel invaded Egypt's Sinai Peninsula in order to force a re-opening of the blockaded waters, though the Suez Canal was closed until 1957, when Israeli troops withdrew from Egypt. However, in the mid-1960s, Egypt imposed another blockade against Israel, which had declared that any such action would be a casus belli. The Egyptian military subsequently mobilized along Israel's border and expelled the United Nations Emergency Force, leading to the Six-Day War of 1967, which ended in an Egyptian defeat and the Israeli occupation of the Sinai Peninsula. Following the outbreak of hostilities in 1967, the Suez Canal was closed until 1975. In 1973, Egypt attempted to retake the Sinai Peninsula by force, triggering the Yom Kippur War; although the initial Egyptian offensive was successful, the conflict ended in an Israeli victory. In 1979, Egypt became the first Arab country to recognize Israel as part of a bilateral peace treaty, in exchange for which Israel withdrew from the Sinai Peninsula in 1982. The two countries have remained at peace since 1979, and the overall Egypt–Israel relationship is generally cordial and cooperative.

Maritime routes through the Straits of Tiran serve the Israeli city of Eilat, which is situated on the Gulf of Aqaba. However, this had limited economic relevance prior to 1956—construction on the Port of Eilat began in 1952, and it was only able to take ocean-going vessels from March 1956 onward. Prior to this point, an average of just two vessels travelled to Eilat on an annual basis.

== History ==
=== 1948–1951 ===
At the start of the Arab–Israeli conflict in May 1948, Egypt blocked passage through the Suez Canal to Israeli-registered ships and to ships (Israeli or otherwise) carrying cargo to and from all Israeli ports. Since all land trade routes were blocked by other Arab states, Israel's ability to trade with East Africa and Asia, mainly to import oil from the Persian Gulf, (Note: Though the oil exporting states of the Persian Gulf by and large refused to recognize or carry on trade with Israel, Imperial Iran, notably a non-Arab Middle Eastern state, then ruled by the pro-Western Shah, was among Israel's primary sources for petroleum prior to the Iranian Revolution in 1979.) was severely hampered. The Straits of Tiran and Suez Canal remained formally closed to Israeli vessels from the creation of Israel in 1948 until the Suez Crisis in 1956.

On 10 March 1949, Israeli forces took control of the area around the abandoned coastal police station of Umm al-Rashrash, where Israel later built the town of Eilat, as part of Operation Uvda, giving Israel access to the Gulf of Aqaba, which leads to the Straits of Tiran. The capture of Umm Rashrash, and thus Israeli access to the Gulf of Aqaba, was not subject to the Egyptian–Israeli armistice agreement, because that agreement had been signed three weeks prior on 24 February 1949. In December 1949 Egypt started to erect military installations on the uninhabited islands of Tiran and Sanafir and the Sinai coast opposite the islands to control the straits. The Egyptian Government communicated its accord with Saudi Arabia to the UK and the US on 30 January and 28 February 1950 respectively:

Taking into consideration certain velleities which have manifested themselves recently on the part of Israel authorities on behalf of the Islands of Tiran and Sanafir in the Red Sea at the entrance of the Gulf of Aqaba, the Government of Egypt acting in full accord with the Government of Saudi Arabia has given orders to occupy effectively these two islands. This occupation is now an accomplished fact.

Israel first complained to the United Nations about Egyptian interference with shipping in June 1951; at this time the complaints were solely about the Suez Canal, as the Straits of Tiran were not relevant (the Port of Eilat did not open until 1952, and even then only to small boats). Israel also prepared military plans to force Egypt to let their ships pass, should diplomatic means prove to be unsuccessful. On 1 September 1951, the United Nations Security Council Resolution 95 was passed; it called upon Egypt to "terminate the restrictions on the passage of international commercial shipping and goods through the Suez Canal wherever bound". Although the resolution referred only to the Suez, Israel believed it would induce a change in Egyptian policy on the Straits of Tiran.

During this period the Straits had limited relevance to Israel's economy; between 1949 and 1956, only ten ships destined for Eilat passed through the Straits of Tiran, all of them having a foreign maritime flag.

=== 1952–1955 ===
On 25 June 1952, Eilat was declared to have a port – albeit one with very basic facilities; a fully functioning port would be developed over the coming years.

Between 1949 and late 1953, Egypt allowed non-strategic goods to pass unhindered to Israel.

On 10 July 1955, David Ben-Gurion, then Israel's Minister of Defence, announced that the port of Eilat was nearly complete; it would be completed by mid-1956. Egyptian intervention was increased further in 1955, after the killing of 38 Egyptian soldiers on 28 February 1955 in Operation Black Arrow and the killing of 72 Egyptian soldiers on 31 August 1955 in Operation Elkayam. In response to the latter event, on 5 September 1955, Egypt tightened its blockade of Israeli shipping through the Straits of Tiran, and closed the airspace above it. In response, Israel stated on 13 September 1955 that "Israel is determined to protect the rights of free passage through this international channel at whatever time and by whatever methods it sees fit"; and on 29 September 1955, two weeks after delivery of this statement, declared that should the blockade remain in effect, Israel would not hesitate to use force.

=== 1956: Suez Crisis ===
In the period prior to what became known as the Suez Crisis, on 13 October 1956 United Nations Security Council Resolution 118 was released, stating that "There should be free and open transit through the Canal without discrimination, overt or covert – this covers both political and technical aspects".

=== 1957–1966 ===
Egypt was required by the international community to open the waterways to all shipping following the conflict, although it never acceded to doing so with respect to Israeli shipping, due formally to its non-recognition of the country.

Following the Suez Crisis, Israel made a number of statements confirming the importance of shipping access – these statements were used as political justification a decade later on the outbreak of the 1967 war. On 1 March 1957, Israel's Foreign Minister Golda Meir declared at the UN General Assembly that any closure of the Straits of Tiran would be considered by Israel as an act of war, or justification for war:

Interference, by armed force, with ships of Israeli flag exercising free and innocent passage in the Gulf of Aqaba and through the Straits of Tiran will be regarded by Israel as an attack entitling it to exercise its inherent right of self-defence under Article 51 of the Charter and to take all such measures as are necessary to ensure the free and innocent passage of its ships in the Gulf and in the Straits

However, in a less widely publicised statement ten days later on 11 March 1957, Nasser announced that he would not permit passage of Israeli ships either through the Gulf of Aqaba or the Suez Canal. However, both Egypt and Israel subsequently and unofficially pulled back from their formal positions.

In practice, these restrictions had limited economic relevance; during the ten years from 1957 to 1967, only one Israeli-flagged ship per month and four foreign-flagged ships per month arrived at Eilat, although by the end of the decade, Israeli oil shipments from Pahlavi Iran became important.

=== 1967: Six-Day War ===
In 1967, as tensions rose between Egypt and Israel, Israel reiterated declarations made in 1957 that any closure of the Straits would be considered an act of war. On 23 May, Nasser shut the Straits of Tiran to Israeli vessels. Israeli Prime Minister Eshkol repeated declarations that Israel had made in 1957, saying that closure of the Straits of Tiran would be an act of war. Then, on May 22, Egypt responded by announcing, in addition to the UN withdrawal, that the Straits of Tiran would be closed to "all ships flying Israeli flags or carrying strategic materials", with effect from May 23. In order to enforce the blockade, Egypt falsely announced that the Tiran straits had been mined. 90% of Israeli oil passed through the Straits of Tiran. Oil tankers that were due to pass through the straits were delayed.

According to Sami Sharaf, Egypt's Minister of State for Presidential Affairs, Nasser knew that the decision to block the Tiran straits made the war "inevitable". Nasser stated, "Under no circumstances can we permit the Israeli flag to pass through the Gulf of Aqaba." The closure of the Tiran Straits was closely linked to the previous withdrawal of the UN peacekeepers, because having the peacekeepers (rather than the Egyptian military) at Sharm El Sheikh was important for keeping that waterway open.

In his speech to Arab trade unionists on May 26, Nasser announced: "If Israel embarks on an aggression against Syria or Egypt, the battle against Israel will be a general one and not confined to one spot on the Syrian or Egyptian borders. The battle will be a general one and our basic objective will be to destroy Israel."

Nasser publicly denied that Egypt would strike first and spoke of a negotiated peace if Israel allowed all Palestinian refugees the right of return, and of a possible compromise over the Straits of Tiran.

As a result of the Six-Day War, on 7 June, Israel announced that the Straits of Tiran constituted an international waterway open to all ships without restriction.

== Legal considerations ==
=== For the Egyptian right to close the Straits ===
Egypt stated that the Gulf of Aqaba had always been a national inland waterway subject to the sovereignty of the only three legitimate littoral States — Jordan, Saudi Arabia, and Egypt — who had the right to bar enemy vessels. The representative of the United Arab Republic further stated that "Israel's claim to have a port on the Gulf was considered invalid, as Israel was alleged to have occupied several miles of coastline on the Gulfline, including Umm Rashrash, in violation of Security Council resolutions of 1948 and the Egyptian–Israel General Armistice Agreement."

The Arab states disputed Israel's right of passage through the Straits, noting they had not signed the Convention on the Territorial Sea and Contiguous Zone specifically because of article 16(4) which provided Israel with that right.

In the United Nations General Assembly debates after the war, the Arab states and their supporters argued that even if international law gave Israel the right of passage, Israel was not entitled to attack Egypt to assert that right, because the closure was not an "armed attack" as defined by Article 51 of the United Nations Charter. Supporting this view in a letter written to the New York Times in June 1967, lawyer Roger Fisher argued that

The United Arab Republic had a good legal case for restricting traffic through the Strait of Tiran. First it is debatable whether international law confers any right of innocent passage through such a waterway.... [Secondly]... a right of innocent passage is not a right of free passage for any cargo at any time. In the words of the Convention on the Territorial Sea: 'Passage is innocent so long as it is not prejudicial to the peace, good order, or security of the coastal state... taking the facts as they were I, as an international lawyer, would rather defend before the International Court of Justice the legality of the U.A.R's action in closing the Strait of Tiran than to argue the other side of the case...

=== Against the Egyptian right to close the Straits ===
After the 1956 campaign in which Israel conquered Sharm el-Sheikh and opened the blocked Straits, it was forced to withdraw and return the territory to Egypt. At the time, members of the international community pledged that Israel would never again be denied use of the Straits of Tiran. The French representative to the UN, for example, announced that an attempt to interfere with free shipping in the Straits would be against international law, and American President Dwight Eisenhower went so far as publicly to recognize that reimposing a blockade in the Straits of Tiran would be seen as an aggressive act which would oblige Israel to protect its maritime rights in accordance with Article 51 of the UN Charter.

The rights of Egypt regarding the Straits of Tiran had been debated at the General Assembly pursuant to Israel's withdrawal from the Sinai following the Suez Crisis. A number of states, including Australia, Canada, Denmark, the Netherlands, New Zealand, the United Kingdom and the United States argued that the Straits were international waters, and, as such, all vessels had the right of "free and innocent passage" through them. India, however, argued that Egypt was entitled to require foreign ships to obtain its consent before seeking access to the gulf because its territorial sea covered the Straits of Tiran. It too recognized the right of innocent passage through such waters, but argued it was up to the coastal State to decide which passage was "innocent".

Israel's political ‘anchor’ in its efforts to prevent any disruption of freedom of shipping through the Straits was a statement by then Foreign Minister Golda Meir at the UN Assembly on 1 March 1957, while announcing her government's decision to respond to the demand for withdrawal from Sinai and the Gaza Strip, to the effect that Israel would view disruption of free shipping through the Tiran Straits as an act of aggression and would reserve the right to react in accordance with Clause 51 of the UN Charter.

International law professor John Quigley argues that under the doctrine of proportionality, Israel would only be entitled to use such force as would be necessary to secure its right of passage.

State practice and customary international law is that ships of all states have a right of innocent passage through territorial seas. That Egypt had consistently granted passage as a matter of state practice until then suggests that its opinio juris in that regard was consistent with practice. Moreover, during the Egyptian occupation of the Saudi islands of Sanafir and Tiran in 1950, it provided assurances to the US that the military occupation would not be used to prevent free passage, and that Egypt recognizes that such free passage is "in conformity with the international practice and the recognized principles of international law.". In 1949 the International Court of Justice held in the Corfu Channel Case (United Kingdom v. Albania) that where a strait was overlapped by a territorial sea foreign ships, including warships, had unsuspendable right of innocent passage through such straits used for international navigation between parts of the high seas, but express provision for innocent passage through straits within the territorial sea of a foreign state was not codified until the 1958 Convention on the Territorial Sea and the Contiguous Zone.

== See also ==
- Red Sea crisis

== Bibliography ==
- Hakim, A.A. (1979). "IV: Legal status of the Gulf of Aqaba and the Straits of Tiran and the rules governing the right of passage therethrough". The Middle Eastern States and the Law of the Sea. Contemporary issues in the Middle East. Manchester University Press. pp. 132–177. ISBN 978-0-7190-0711-8.
- Salaheddine Dabbagh, السيادة العربية على خليج العقبة ومضيق تيران دراسة قانونية (Arab Sovereignty over the Gulf of Aqaba and the Straits of Tiran), 1967
- Reyner, Anthony S. “The Strait of Tirān and the Sovereignty of the Sea.” Middle East Journal, vol. 21, no. 3, 1967, pp. 403–08, http://www.jstor.org/stable/4324168. Accessed 28 Apr. 2022.
- Barak, Eitan (2007). "Between Reality and Secrecy: Israel's Freedom of Navigation through the Straits of Tiran, 1956–1967". Middle East Journal. 61 (4): 657–79. doi:10.3751/61.4.15. JSTOR 4330453.
- Barak, Eitan (2008). "The Freedom That Never Was: Israel's Freedom of Overflight over the Straits of Tiran Prior to the Six Day War". Journal of Contemporary History. 43 (1): 75–91. doi:10.1177/0022009407084558. JSTOR 30036490. S2CID 159471496.
- Leo Gross, “Passage through the Strait of Tiran and in the Gulf of Aqaba.” Law and Contemporary Problems, vol. 33, no. 1, 1968, pp. 125–46, https://doi.org/10.2307/1190846. Accessed 28 Apr. 2022.
- Richard Reeve Baxter, The Law of War in the Arab–Israeli Conflict: On Water and On Land
