= Ofira =

Former Israeli settlement in the Sinai Peninsula

Ofira عوفيرا אופירה
- Israeli settlement (formerly)
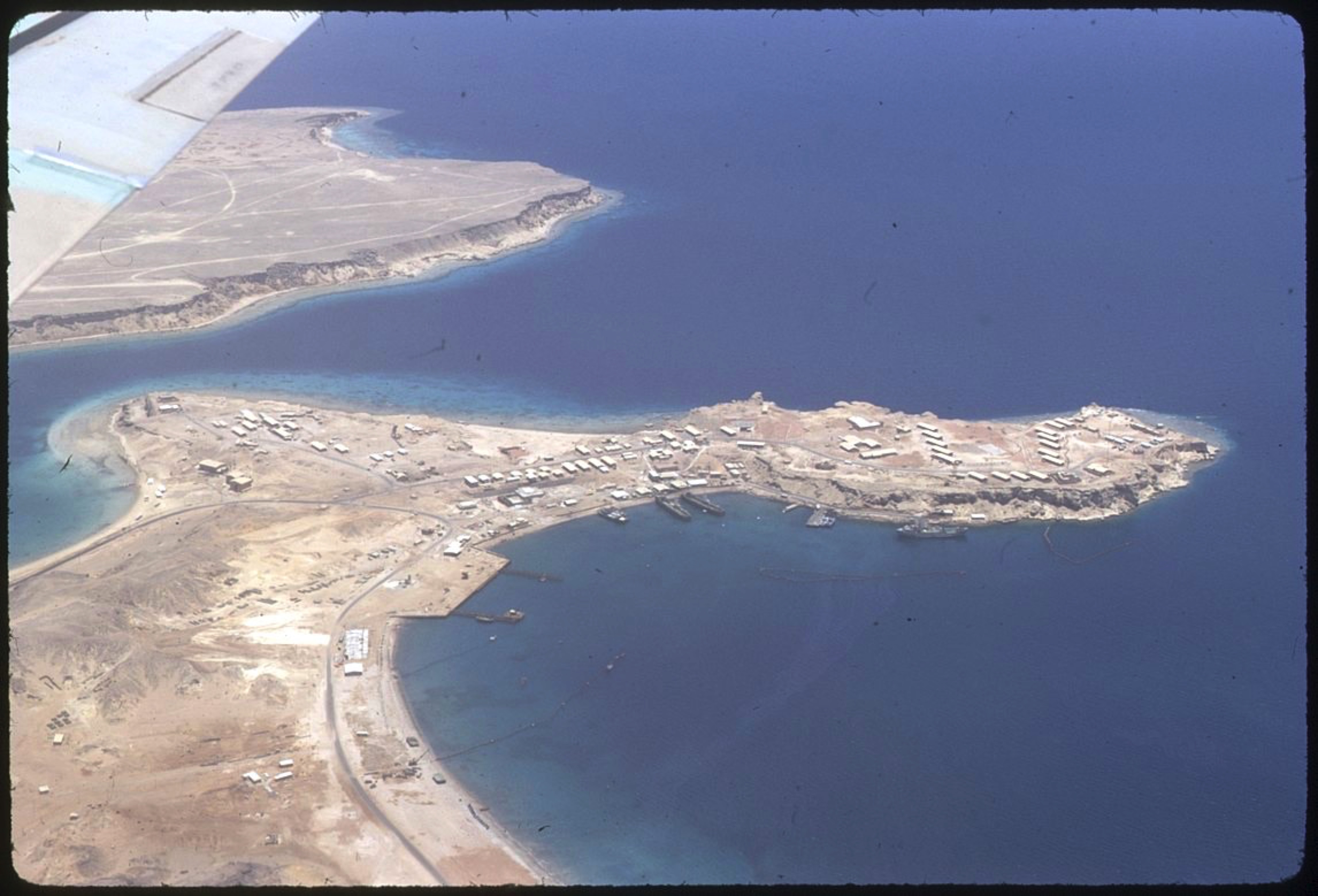
- Aerial view of Ofira

- Location of Ofira
- Coordinates: 27°52′03″N 34°17′43″E
- Country: Egypt
- Governorate: South Sinai

Population (1982)
  - Total: app. 1,000

Ofira (Hebrew: אופירה; Arabic: عوفيرا) is a former Israeli settlement in the Sharm El Sheikh area of the southern Sinai Peninsula, an Egyptian territory that was under occupation from 1967 to 1982. Ofira was settled from 1969 and was meant to accommodate 500 families. An airfield was opened in 1968, today known as Sharm el-Sheikh International Airport.

It was named after the Biblical Ophir, an African land where gold was mined.

Ofira overlooked Sharm el-Maya Bay and the Nesima area. Six kilometers north at Naama Bay, constructed its first tourist village.

During the Yom Kippur War, it was the site of an air battle.

In the spring of 1982, Ofira was vacated as the Sinai was returned to Egypt pursuant to the Camp David Accords that led to the Egypt–Israel peace treaty. Unlike Yamit, Ofira was not demolished. Instead, it was given to Egypt and populated by Egyptians and continues to be to this day.
