= Field School =

Field School can mean:

- Field school, mentored field research
- Farmer field school, an international farm-education program
- Field school (Israel), field schools in Israel

It can also refer to schools with the name "Field" in them:

- The Field School, a college-preparatory school in Washington, D.C., United States
- Field High School, a public high school near Mogadore, Ohio, United States
- Field Elementary School in Field, British Columbia, Canada
- Field Elementary School (Massachusetts), an elementary school in Weston, Massachusetts, United States
