= Ofira Air Battle =

1973 battle of the Yom Kippur War

Coordinates: 27°54′44″N 34°19′47″E

- Part of the Yom Kippur War
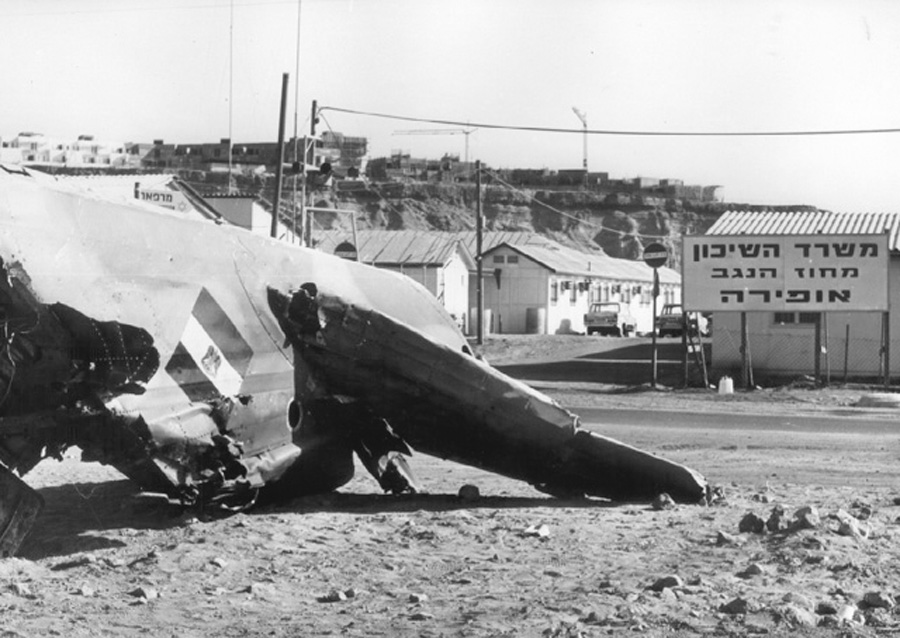
- Tail of an Egyptian MiG-17, one of the seven downed, at Ofira.
Date	October 6, 1973
Location	Sinai, Egypt
Result	Israeli victory

Belligerents
Israel	Egypt

Strength
2 F-4 Phantom II aircraft	20 MiG-17 aircraft 8 MiG-21 aircraft

Casualties and losses
None	7 aircraft shot down

The Ofira Air Battle was one of the first air battles of the Yom Kippur War. On 6 October 1973, Egypt launched a massive surprise attack on Israel that included over 200 Egyptian aircraft participating in an opening airstrike. The Israeli Air Force (IAF) Base Ofira at Sharm el-Sheikh came under attack by 20 Egyptian Air Force MiG-17s and their eight MiG-21 escorts. Not realizing the extent of the attack, Israel quickly scrambled two F-4E Phantom II fighter jets. The Israeli pilots proceeded to jettison their external fuel tanks and engage all 28 MiGs in aerial combat. In just under six minutes, seven Egyptian MiGs had been shot down and the remaining Egyptian planes disengaged and returned to Egypt. The Israeli Phantoms returned to their base. The Egyptians dispute the Israeli account of the battle, but they never did provide their own version of what happened. One of the Egyptian pilots killed was Egyptian President Anwar Sadat's half-brother, Atef.

== Prelude ==
In the summer of 1973, Libyan Arab Airlines Flight 114 accidentally flew over the Sinai. It was intercepted by the IAF and ordered to land but refused and was subsequently shot down. IAF high command feared this might lead to a reprisal against El-Al aircraft en route to South Africa and back and therefore maintained fighter aircraft on quick reaction alert (QRA) at Ofira. These aircraft were also meant to counter the threat posed to the small Israeli Navy Red Sea flotilla and the Hawk missile batteries guarding the Red Sea straits from Egyptian MiGs at Hurghada. Base commander at the time was Ya'acov 'Yak' Nevo.

Two IAF 107 Squadron F-4E Phantoms were present at Ofira on Yom Kippur, October 6, 1973, when war broke out. These were manned by four airmen: pilot Amir Nahumi with navigator Yossi Yavin and pilot Daniel Shaki with navigator David Regev, all relatively inexperienced at the time. At 9:00 AM they were issued a red alert by the controller. At 1:50 PM the sirens were sounded. Several approaching low-flying formations were spotted on radar, yet the controller did not scramble the pair, failing to realise the significance of the attack. No longer waiting for the order to scramble, Nahumi ordered the mechanics to start up the planes and took off. Shaki joined him. Nahumi later described the scene:

I decided to take off, and seconds later the runway was bombed. Had we waited any longer we would have been unable to do so. There were seven four-ship formations of MiG-17s and MiG-21s.

== Battle according to the Israeli account ==
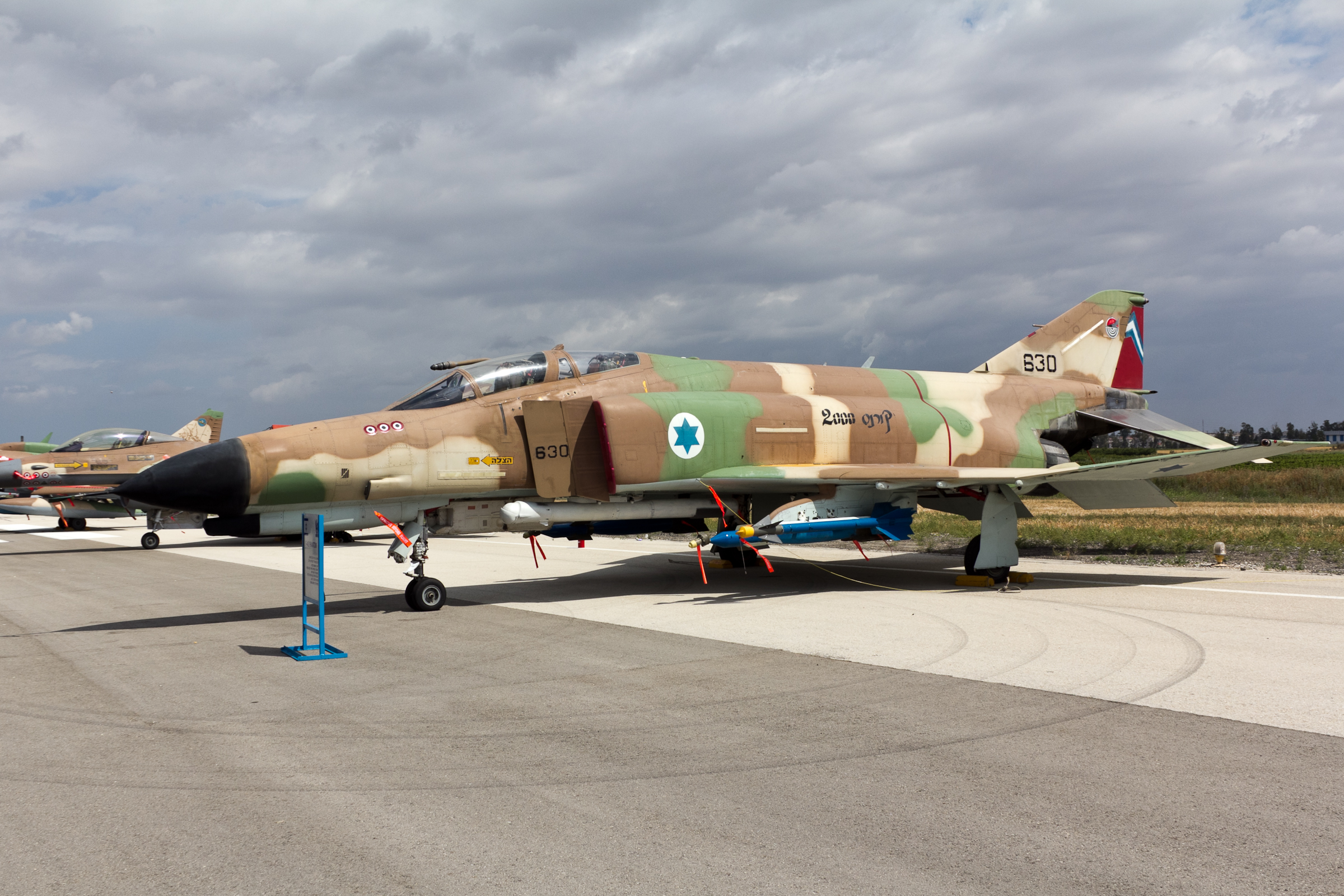
Israeli F-4E Phantom. Flag markings on nose credit the aircraft with 3 combat kills.

Soon after the Israeli F-4s took off, the MiGs began bombing the runways. Nahumi ordered Shaki to dump the detachable fuel tanks and to take the west end of the base while he would take the east one. Nahumi then shot down one MiG with a Sidewinder missile. He turned back toward the base and crossed the path of two MiGs bombing it. These rose and flew away. The base's MIM-23 Hawk battery held fire to avoid hitting the Israeli aircraft, and two MiGs dived down to destroy it. Nahumi started to chase the leading MiG flying as low as possible and fired his M61 Gatling gun but missed. The MiG aborted its bombing mission. Nahumi tried to chase it, but found out his left engine had suffered a compressor stall, presumably following a cannon burst. After a short period of flying on one engine he managed to restart the engine and broke away from the MiG to attack its partner's tail. The MiG turned sharply toward him. Nahumi pulled up until he was facing the MiG and shot it down as it passed by. The second MiG fled.

Nahumi then saw another pair of MiG-17s attacking a communications unit near the bay. These were startled to encounter Nahumi and one of them fired its air-to-surface missiles at the Phantom. The Phantom shot down that MiG with a guided missile from a distance of 600 meters. Shaki, meanwhile, had shot down three planes and was looking for the fourth, when MiG-21s attacked. One of them found itself in an inferior position and descended at a speed of 500 knots (930 km/h) to sea level, hit the water and bounced back up twice, before pulling up and flying away. Shaki was running out of fuel and decided to land on the damaged runway. Nahumi was then blinded by a flash of light reflecting from another pair of MiGs trying to escape. Nahumi shot one down and its partner fled to the safety of the mountains. Nahumi had also almost run out of fuel and decided not to give chase.

== Aftermath ==
Nahumi and Shaki consulted the forward air controller and decided to land on the parallel runway, which was shorter but less damaged. Once on the ground, they began preparing their planes for another Egyptian attack, which never materialized. The four airmen were later awarded the Distinguished Service Medal for their performance during the battle.

== Egyptian account ==
According to the Egyptians, Ras Nasrani Air Base, the former Egyptian name of Ofir, was indeed among several Israeli bases in the Sinai targeted by the Egyptian air strike on October 6, in which around 220 aircraft took part. The MiG-21 aircraft escorting the MiG-17s in the airstrike against Ras Nasrani were part of the No. 25 Sqn of the EAF's 102nd Air Wing. The MiG-21s did not participate in the ground attack, and according to the pilots, no aerial opposition was ever encountered.

Egyptian commanders claim that five aircraft were lost in the opening airstrike of the war altogether; Saad El Shazly, the Egyptian Chief of Staff, stated that total losses from October 6 up to the morning of October 7 were five aircraft. Another Egyptian commander, Abdel Ghani el-Gamasy, reported just five aircraft losses for the entire air strike as well, as do other sources. Another source mentions the loss of seven aircraft to Israeli fighters and several others to anti-aircraft fire.
