= Ze'ev Drukman =

Israeli architect

Ze'ev Druckman
- זאב דרוקמן
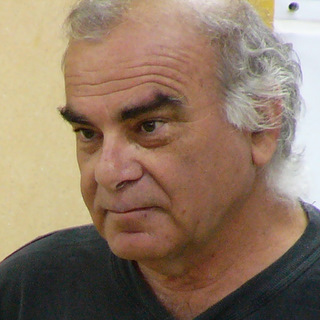
- Born: 1945 (age 80–81); Mandatory Palestine
- Education: Technion – Israel Institute of Technology (Faculty of Architecture and Town planning)
- Occupation: Architect
- Projects: Yamit

Professor Ze’ev Druckman (He: זאב דרוקמן; born 1945) is an Israeli architect and academic. He is the founder of the graduate program in Architecture and Urban Design at the Bezalel Academy of Arts and Design in Jerusalem.

Druckman was one of the principal designers of Yamit, an Israeli settlement in the Sinai Peninsula.

== Career ==
Druckman studied at the Faculty of Architecture and Town Planning at the Technion – Israel Institute of Technology in Haifa, starting in 1966. Immediately after graduating in 1971, he joined the planning team of the Ministry of Housing and Construction. Several years later, he became the chief architect of the ministry's Northern District and led experimental development projects in the Planning and Engineering Department until 1987.

Beginning in 1977, he taught for two years at the Technion's Faculty of Architecture and Town Planning. In 1990, he was appointed head of the Department of Environmental Design at the Bezalel Academy of Arts and Design in Jerusalem. Two years later, under his leadership, the Council for Higher Education recognized the department as a full-fledged School of Architecture. Druckman headed the department for over a decade.

In 2009, Druckman established Bezalel's master's degree in Urban Design (M.Urb.Des), which he led until 2013. The program was formally accredited by the Council for Higher Education in 2011.

Prof. Druckman has lectured at faculties of architecture and urban planning across the globe, including in Hong Kong, India, France, Slovakia, Germany, Austria, and the United States. He leads international seminars on architecture and urban design.

He represents Israel at the International Union of Architects (UIA), within the working group for education and cultural buildings. In 2008, he received the “Architects Association Honor Award” for his contribution to architectural education in Israel.

In April 2008, Druckman was appointed by Central Command Major General Gadi Shamni to serve on the Council for Higher Education (Judea and Samaria).

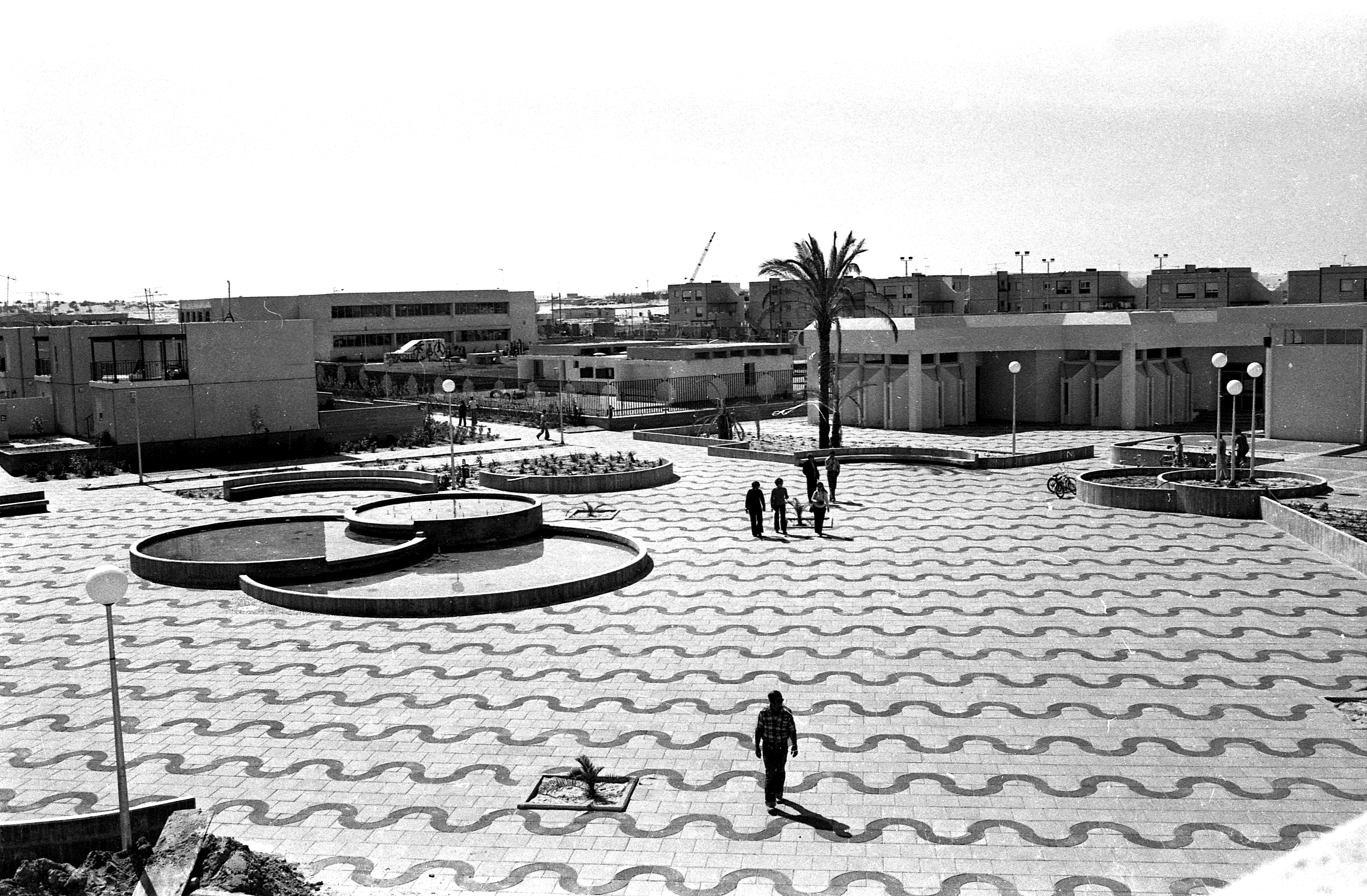
Yamit, Sinai

A book composed of a collection of his dialogues called a House is not zero was written on his thought.

== Notable projects ==
- Urban and architectural planning of the city of Yamit (1971–1975)
- Master plans for development towns in the Galilee
- KIAH School for the Deaf, Jerusalem
- Jerusalem Bilingual School
- High school in Karmiel
- Sports stadium in Nazareth Illit
- Special education elementary school in Modi'in-Maccabim-Re'ut (in collaboration with architects Adam and Danny Eil)
- Planning of Independence Square (Netanya)
- Urban design for northern Acre
- City hall, Tirat Carmel
- Urban renewal and design of Ajami neighborhood, Jaffa
- Beit Eliezer Elementary and High School, Hadera
- Public elementary school, Hadera
- Yaakov Cohen Elementary School, Kiryat Ono (2009; built in phases)

He has also planned many residential neighborhoods in Ashkelon, Tirat Carmel, Tikva neighborhood (Tel Aviv), Nazareth Illit, and housing clusters in Tiberias, Hatzor HaGlilit, and Kiryat Shmona.
