= Pri'el =

Former Israeli settlement in Sinai, Egypt

Coordinates: 31.20533°N 34.25914°E

Pri'el (Hebrew: פריאל) was a moshav and Israeli settlement in the Sinai Peninsula. The moshav was established in early 1978 in the Yamit region of Sinai by a group of Jewish immigrants from the Soviet Union.

As a result of the Egypt–Israel peace treaty in 1979, Israel was required to evacuate all its settlements in the peninsula. As a result, in 1982 all the homes were evacuated and bulldozed.
