= Closure of the Suez Canal (1956–1957) =

Part of the 1956 Suez Crisis

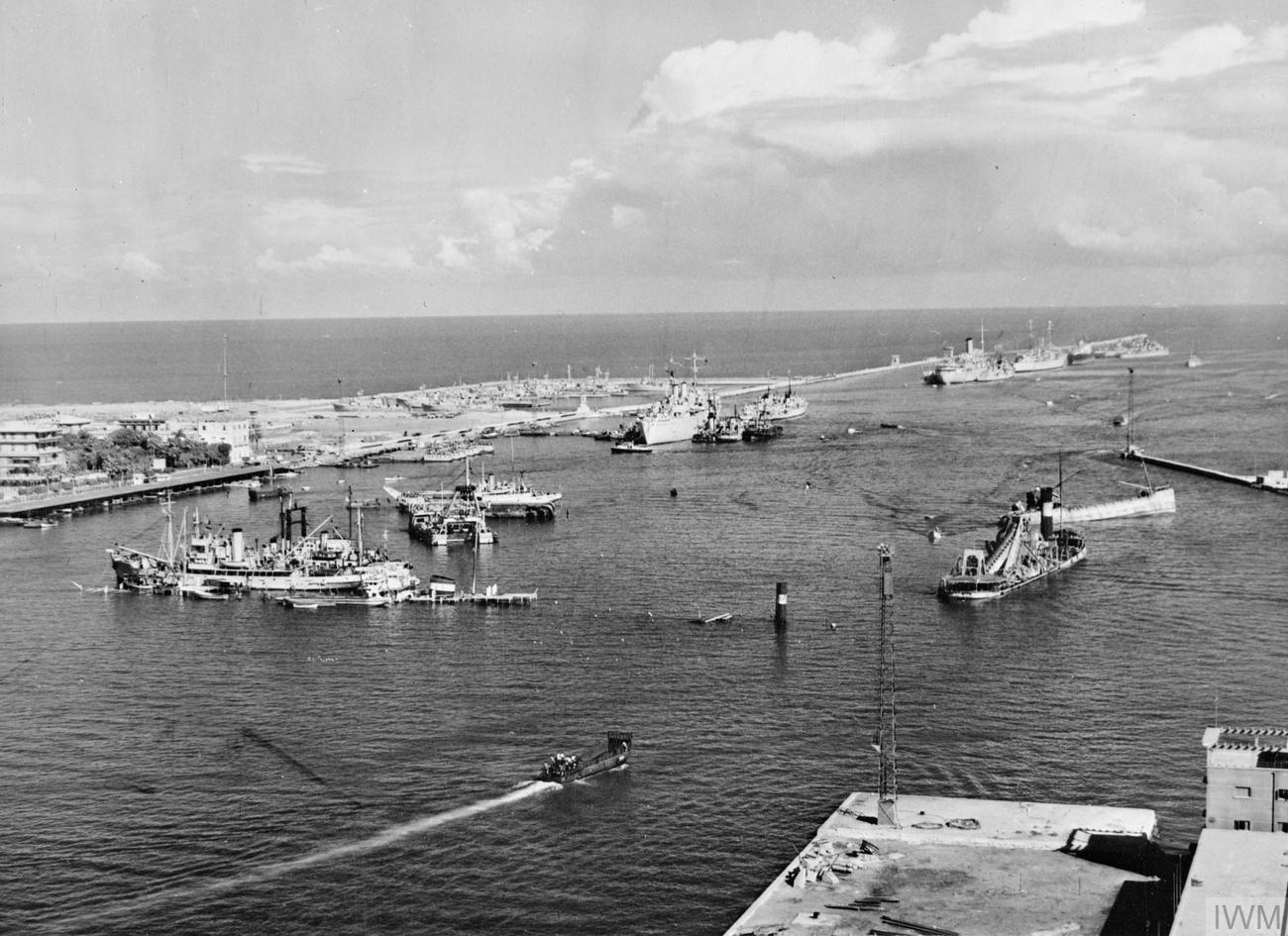
Port Said, Suez Canal blockade

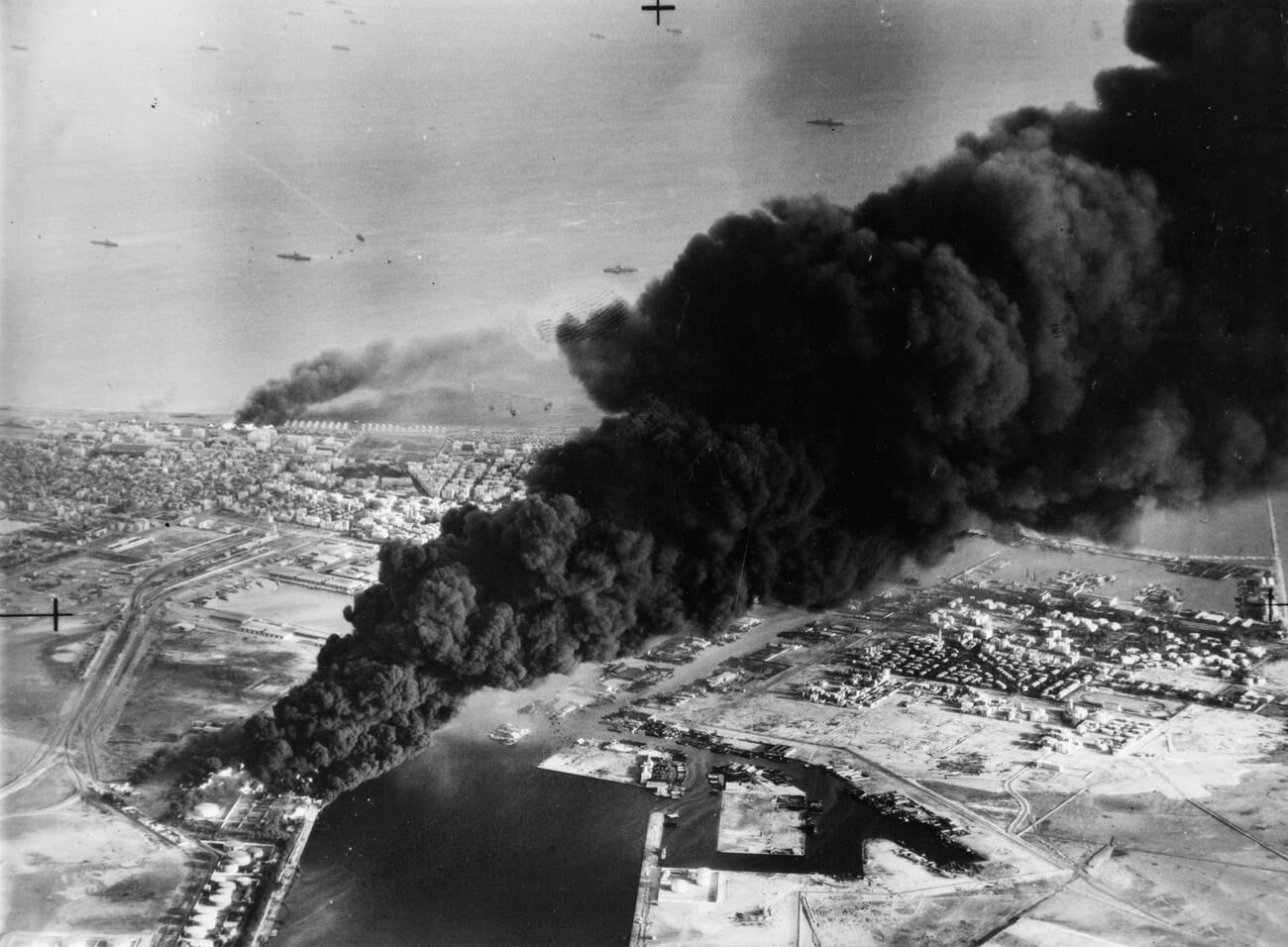
Suez Canal invasion, 1956 Operation Musketeer

The closure of the Suez Canal from November 1956 to April 1957 was caused by the Second Arab–Israeli war, also known as the Suez Crisis, in 1956. On 26 July 1956 Egyptian president Gamal Abdel Nasser nationalized the Suez Canal from British and French investors who owned the Suez Canal Company, causing Britain and France to devise a military operation with the help of Israel to invade the Egyptian Sinai Peninsula and have British and French paratroopers drop in to protect the Suez Canal, but the objective was to take the canal back. The United States and Soviet Union condemned the invasion and de-escalated the situation by early 1957.

== Oil supply through the canal ==
Around 67% of oil that Europe consumed at the time came through the Suez Canal from mostly Arab states.

== Aswan Dam project ==
The United States was initially going to help fund the Aswan Dam but reneged on their earlier commitment because they believed Egypt was becoming closer to the Soviet Union, through such actions as purchasing arms from Czechoslovakia, and recognizing the Chinese Communist Party as the government of China. Gamal Abdel Nasser nationalized the Suez Canal to get the transit fees from that to help fund the Aswan Dam project.

== Egypt blockade of Straits of Tiran ==
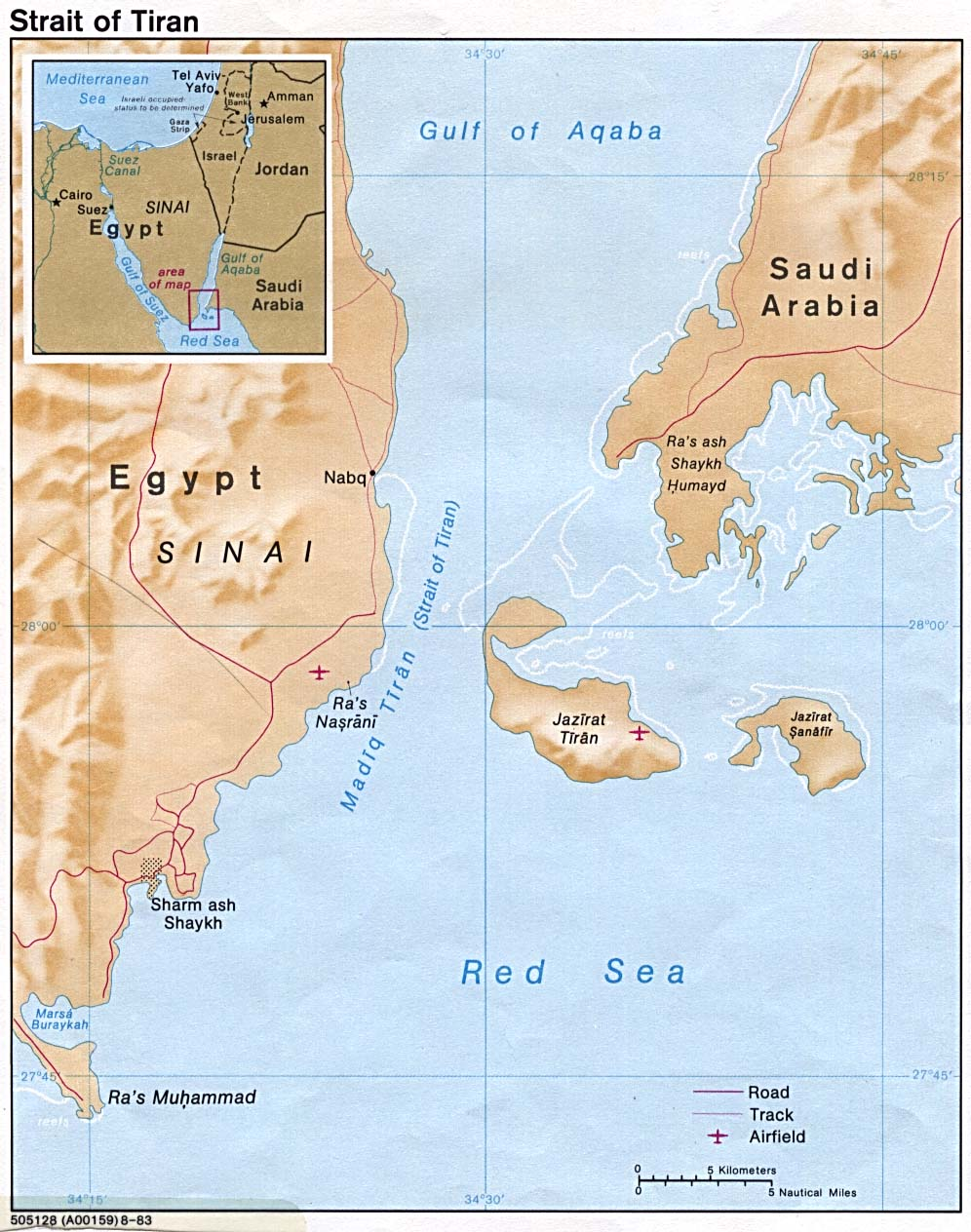
Straits of Tiran from the Red Sea that leads to Gulf of Aqaba and the southern port of Israel Port of Eilat

In the aftermath of the Israeli reprisals against the Palestinian fedayoun and the Egyptian forces in Gaza Strip, growing tensions between Egypt and Israel resulted in the strengthening of Egyptian blockade of the Straits of Tiran in September 1955. This action was followed by diplomatic protests by the Israeli government, as the blockade prevented passage through this international waterway and blocking safe passage of civilian ships to the Port of Eilat, Israel's southern port, and was contradictory to an Egyptian proclamation of freedom of access on 28 January 1950.

The Israel government followed through with stated warnings that it considered the blockade of the Straits of Tiran a casus belli, launching attacks on Egyptian forces in the Sinai. In the ensuing Six-Day War (5–10 June 1967), Israel gained control of Sinai Peninsula. Egypt launched the 1973 Yom Kippur War (6 to 25 October 1973) to try and regain control of the Suez Canal, then the postwar negotiations resulted in renewed diplomatic negotiations via the Kilo 101 talks, which eventually lead to the 1979 peace talks.

In 1982, the Sinai was returned to Egypt and diplomatic relations normalized through the successful Egypt–Israel peace treaty.

== See also ==
- Closure of the Suez Canal (1967–1975)
- 2021 Suez Canal obstruction
- Arab–Israeli conflict
- Israeli passage through the Suez Canal and Straits of Tiran
- Six-Day War
