= Yamit =

Israeli settlement in the Sinai Peninsula

Yamit ימית
- Former Israeli settlement
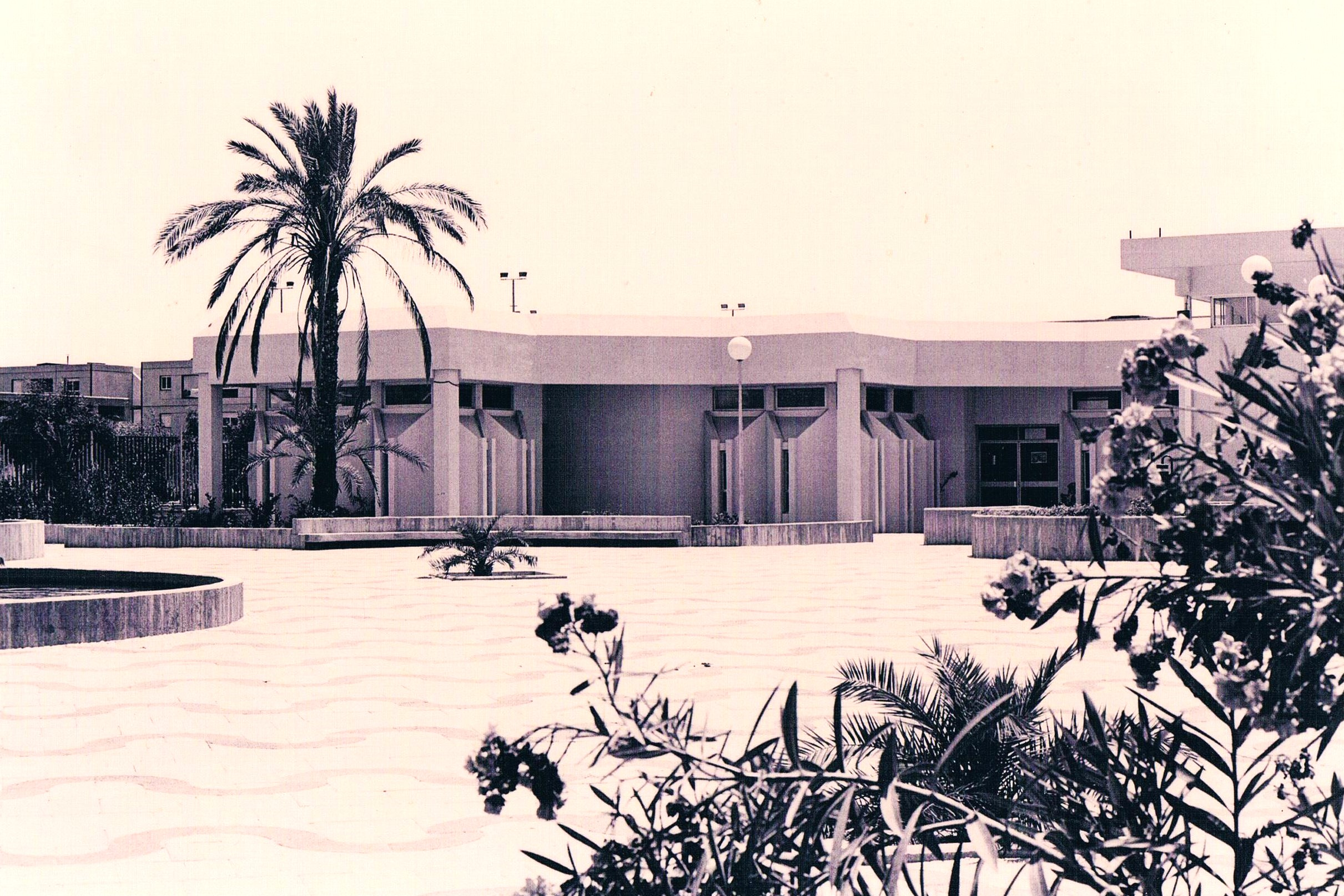
- Yamit community shopping center

- Location of Yamit Yamit (Egypt) Yamit (Israel)
- Coordinates: 31°16′32″N 34°10′2″E
- Country: Egypt
- Currently located in: North Sinai

Population (1979)
  - Total: 2,500

Yamit (Hebrew: ימית) was an Israeli settlement in the northern part of the Sinai Peninsula with a population of about 2,500 people. Yamit was established during Israel's occupation of the peninsula from the end of the 1967 Six-Day War until that part of the Sinai was handed over to Egypt in April 1982, as part of the terms of the 1979 Egypt–Israel peace treaty. It was the largest Jewish town in Sinai. Prior to the return of the land to Egypt, all the homes were evacuated and bulldozed.

== History ==
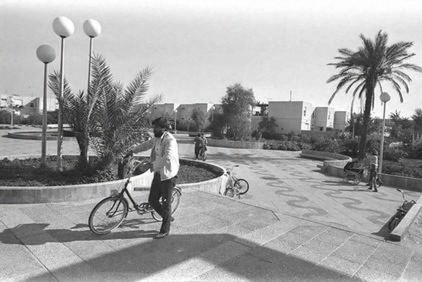
Yamit town plaza

Located in the Rafah Plain region south of the Gaza Strip, Yamit was envisioned as a large city for 200,000 people that would create a buffer zone between the Gaza Strip and the Sinai Peninsula. It was built on land in a 140,000 dunam (14,000 hectare) area from which some 1,500 Bedouin families of the Al-Ramilat tribes were ordered to leave by Moshe Dayan and Southern Command head Ariel Sharon. Construction of Yamit began in January 1975. When the first fifty residents arrived there were no buildings, roads, electricity or water. Nevertheless, ambitious plans were drawn up for a port, a flour mill, a Dead Sea canal, a hotel and a university. A cornerstone was laid for a yeshiva. By the second year, the population reached 100.

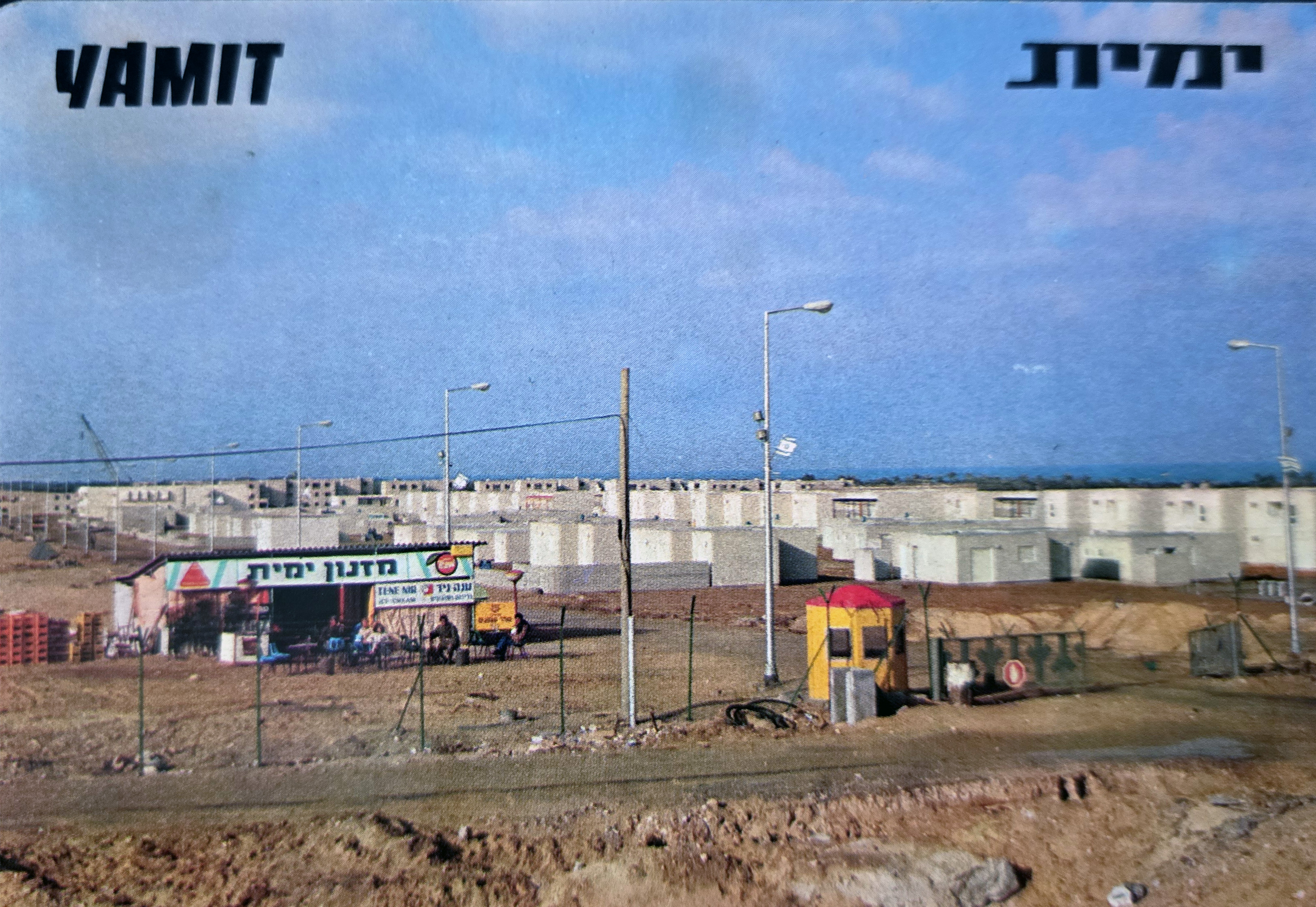
Entrance to the settlement in the 1970s

Upon the signing of the Egypt–Israel peace treaty in 1979, it was clear that Yamit's days were numbered. Most of the residents accepted compensation and relocated to other cities. Those who chose to stay were joined by nationalist supporters who moved in to boost their numbers. When the order came to evacuate Yamit, the remaining residents barricaded themselves inside their homes, while others climbed up to their roofs as soldiers broke down their doors.

Before the establishment of Yamit, the area south of Gaza known as the Rafah salient was farmed by Bedouin who grew almond, peach, olive and castor-oil trees, as well as wheat. Other crops were grown near the coastline, where groundwater rose almost to the surface. They also herded sheep and goats. Some lived in tents, but others lived in tin shacks and concrete houses'.

=== Expulsion of the Bedouin ===
On January 14, 1972, Ariel Sharon ordered the expulsion of the Bedouins of the Rafah Plain, about 18 square miles (47 km^{2}) of land in northeast Sinai. According to Eyal Weizman, their orchards and water wells were also destroyed. The tribal sheikhs claimed 20,000 people were affected although Israeli army statistics put the number at 4,950. Those living in tents were given a day to remove them. Those in concrete houses were given an extra day to leave before the structures were razed. Following a map drawn by Sharon, bulldozers were employed to remove all structures that remained. The establishment of Yamit was formally approved by the Israeli government in September 1973.

Settling northeastern Sinai was an idea strongly promoted by Moshe Dayan. The idea was subsequently proposed in a document on Israeli policy in the occupied territories by Yisrael Galili in an attempt to bridge the gap between hardliners and moderates in the Israeli Labor Party. According to an Israeli kibbutznik who visited the area immediately after the expulsion, a group from kibbutzim "were stunned by the dimensions of the wreckage, and by the number of persons who were expelled." The IDF claimed that it had merely evacuated a few nomads from state lands onto which nomads had recently encroached. A month later, the head of the International Committee of the Red Cross raised the issue with Dayan's viceroy in the territories, Shlomo Gazit, who knew nothing about it. The IDF chief of staff David Elazar, on being informed, flew over the area by helicopter to see for himself and subsequently appointed a commission to investigate what Ariel Sharon had done.

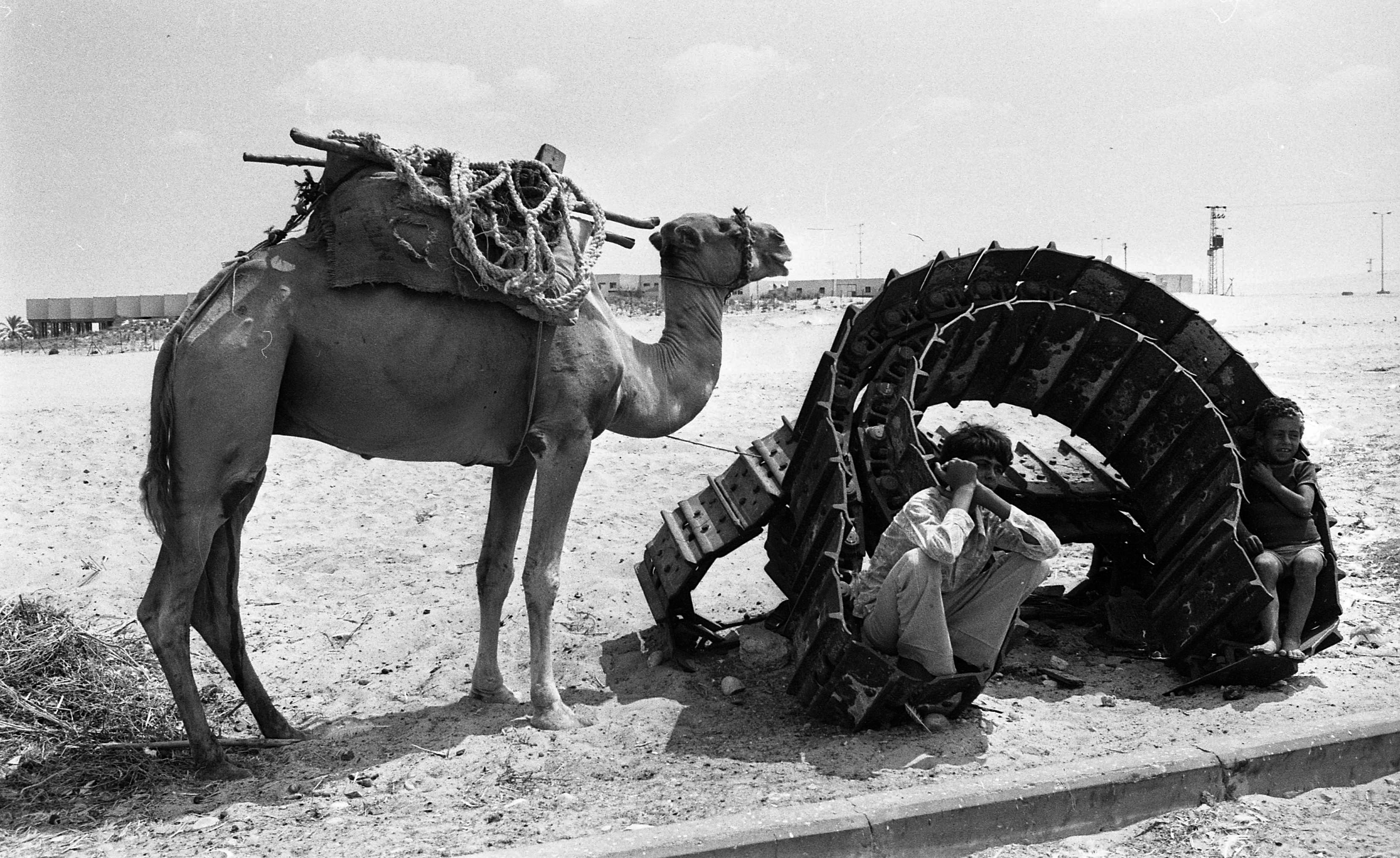
Bedouin with his camel at Yamit

The subsequent inquiry revealed that the expulsion of the Bedouins had occurred under Dayan's initiative and without government authorization. Golda Meir's government implemented the pre-prepared plan for settlements on this Bedouin territory. According to one source, it was this official decision to establish a large Israeli city at Yamit which, for Anwar Sadat and senior Egyptian officials, "was the straw that broke the camel's back", eventuating in the loss of hopes for a peace agreement and the onset of the Yom Kippur War. Avi Shlaim argues however that the Arab decision to go to war preceded the Galilee Document's publication. Nonetheless, Dayan made public remarks about his intention to build a deep-water port at Yamit, cutting Egypt off from the Gaza Strip, and Sadat is on record as saying, "Every word spoken about Yamit is a knife pointing at me personally and at my self-respect."

Local kibbutzniks were outraged by the destruction and, in consultation with the tribal chief, Suleiman Hussein Uda Abu Hilo, arranged for a human rights lawyer to appeal on their behalf. Some kibbutzniks, among them Oded Lifshitz and Latif Dori, were also activists in the left-wing Mapam party and ran Rafiah tours to show Israelis the destruction that had taken place, and to bring to public attention the fact that the image of the Bedouin as nomads were inexact, and that their orchards were being bulldozed. In July 1972, nine Bedouin sheikhs from the area petitioned the Supreme Court of Israel to obtain an order permitting them to return to their homes. Their case was presented by a Mapam man, Haim Holzman, who argued that the evacuation had no legal or military rationale, and violated the Geneva Convention. Ariel Sharon was ordered by the court to show cause for the expulsion. General Israel Tal gave a deposition arguing that the Rafiah Plain area had been used by terrorists, who had attacked Israelis, as a shelter. A buffer zone, involving "Jewish settlement and presence" between Egypt and the Gaza Strip, was required for security reasons. Holzmann replied, arguing that Tal's maps showed terrorist attacks had been in decline, and the incidents enumerated lay outside the zone where the expulsion had taken place. Holzmann died of a heart attack before his summation, later given by his law partner, could be delivered. While the case was still pending, Dayan secretly asked Tel Aviv architects Yehuda Drexler and Ze'ev Drukman to draw up a blueprint for the projected port town of Yamit. The design brochure they produced was then sequestered by the IDF to ensure that the material would not come to the court's attention.

Dayan envisaged a metropolis whose population would be expanded to a quarter of a million people by the year 2000. His plan was shelved because its cost would have had serious consequences for Israel's poor. The first residents arrived in August 1975 and the population quickly expanded. Two settlement blocs surrounded it: to the east lay Pri'el, Talme Yosef, Netiv Ha-Asara, Ugda, Nir Avraham, Prigan, Sadot, Diqua, and the block centre Avshalom, while south of Yamit, settlements were made at Atzmona, Tarsag and Ne'ot Sinai. (Note: According to Noam Chomsky, the Yamit plan foresaw the construction of 9 villages, 6 kibbutzim, together with Yamit.) Most of the population was composed of secular Israelis who were attracted to the pristine settings near the Mediterranean and the low cost of housing. The settlement was positioned about half a kilometre away from the shore, adjacent to Bedouins who lived nearby along the shoreline itself.

== Evacuation ==
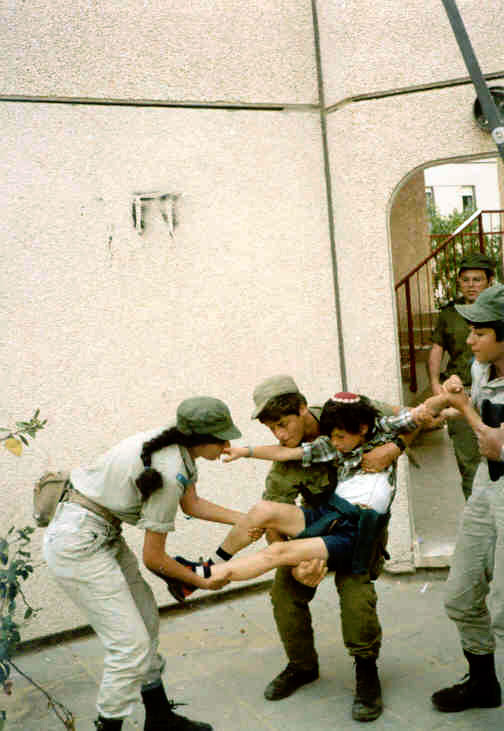
Israeli soldiers evacuating Yamit by force

The evacuation of Yamit was part of the final stage of Israeli evacuation from Sinai. It was carried out in the face of powerful domestic opposition in Israel. Moshe Arens (of the Likud party), the head of the Knesset's Foreign Affairs and Defense Committee, and professor Yuval Ne'eman, the leader of the right-wing Tehiya party, led that opposition. They wanted to stop the evacuation and revoke the peace treaty with Egypt, arguing, that once Egypt had the entire Sinai, it would cancel the peace treaty with Israel and rejoin the rest of the Arab world. Yamit was evacuated on April 23, 1982, amid resistance by some Yamit settlers and other supporters. Some residents barricaded themselves on the rooftops before being dragged into buses by Israeli soldiers. Political extremists from the rest of the country infiltrated Yamit to demonstrate their solidarity and sabotage the withdrawal. Among the more extreme examples of resistance were the disciples of Rabbi Meir Kahane, who vowed to take their own lives rather than surrender. After the personal intervention of Kahane, they agreed to leave.

The initial agreement between Israel and Egypt stipulated that Egypt would pay $80 million for the houses and infrastructure of Yamit. Ariel Sharon decided to destroy the settlement. Sharon claimed that he decided in response to an Egyptian request, but this was not the case. According to the Israeli ambassador to Egypt at the time, Moshe Sasson, Begin feared that the Israeli settlers would return to their homes surreptitiously and that a disastrous clash between them and the Egyptians might occur. One suggestion was that Sharon deliberately made the whole process more traumatic than it needed to be so that the Israeli public would refuse the dismantling of other settlements even for the sake of peace.

Since the demolition, the only structure that remains visible is the skeleton of the main synagogue, which contains no visible Jewish symbols.

== Sources ==
- Gorenberg, Gershom (2006). The Accidental Empire: Israel and the Birth of the Settlements, 1967–1977. Henry Holt & Company.
- Shlaim, Avi (2001). The Iron Wall: Israel and the Arab World. Penguin Books.
