= Closure of the Suez Canal (1967–1975) =

Part of the Six-Day War and Yom Kippur War

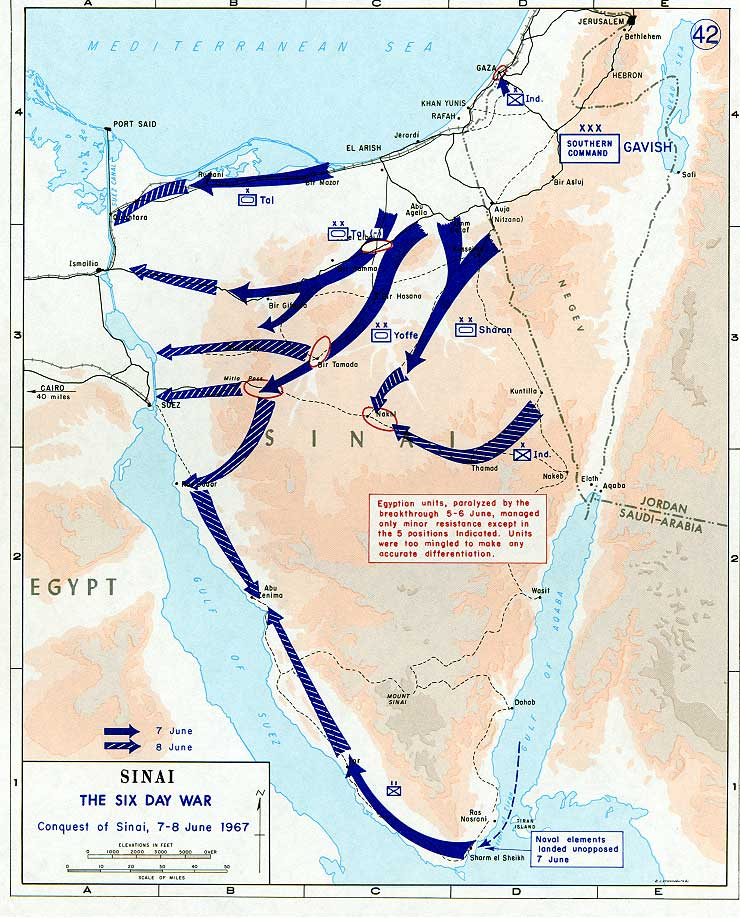
Israeli capture of the Egyptian Sinai Peninsula, 7–8 June 1967, during the Six-Day War

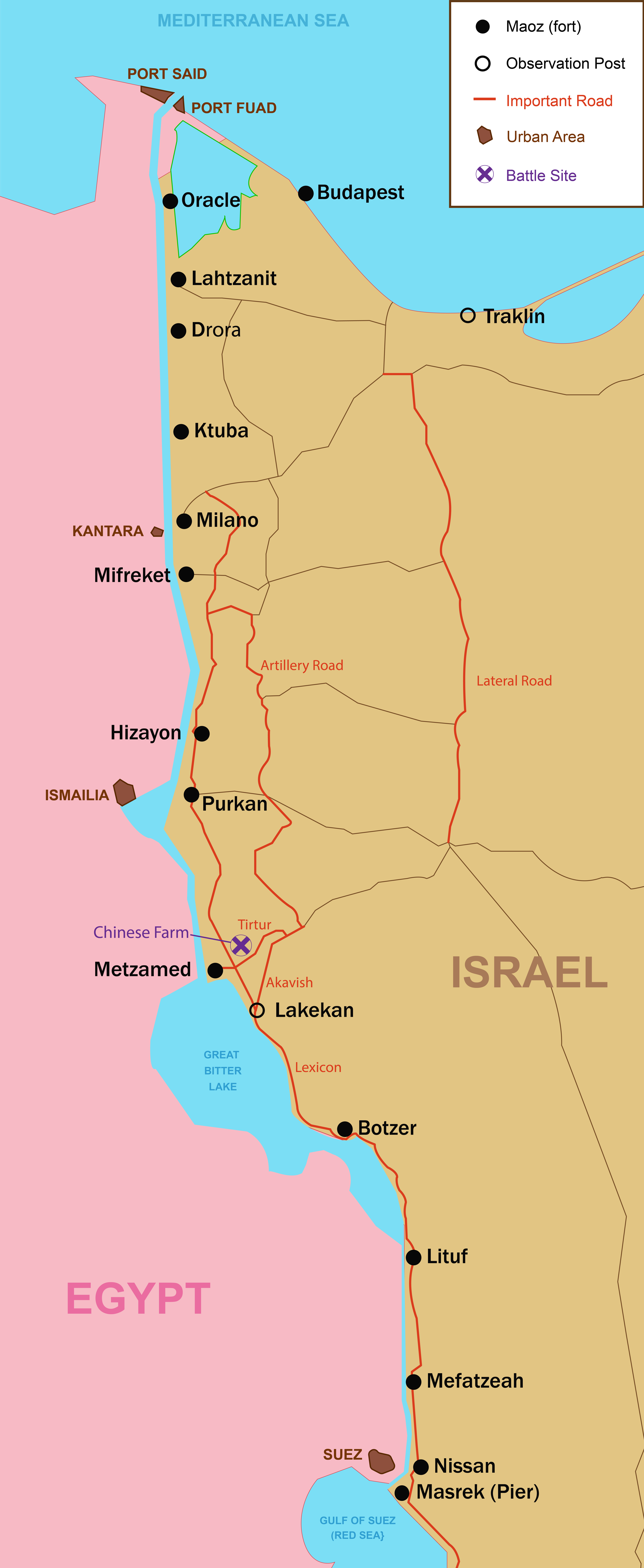
Israeli fortifications on the Suez Canal (1973) known as the Bar Lev Line

On 6 June 1967, after the start of the Six-Day War, Egypt closed the Suez Canal, which it owned and operated, and kept it closed until 5 June 1975, through most of the Israeli occupation of the Sinai Peninsula including the east bank of the Canal. The Six-Day War had begun the day before the closure on 5 June 1967 between Israel and several Arab states including Egypt. In a surprise attack, Israel preemptively bombed most of Egypt's airfields and then entered and occupied the Sinai Peninsula including the entire east bank of the Suez Canal. The Suez Canal was the frontline between the Israeli and Egyptian military forces. Israel built the Bar Lev Line of fortifications along the east bank of the canal. In 1966, 60% of Italy's, 39% of France's, and 25% of the United Kingdom's total oil consumption passed through the Suez Canal.

== 1956–1957 closure ==
The Canal had been closed before, from October 1956 until March 1957 during the Suez Crisis, when Gamal Abdel Nasser, the president of Egypt at the time, was aligning himself with the Soviet Union and he nationalized the Suez Canal, seizing it from French and British investors.

== War of Attrition, 1967–1970 ==
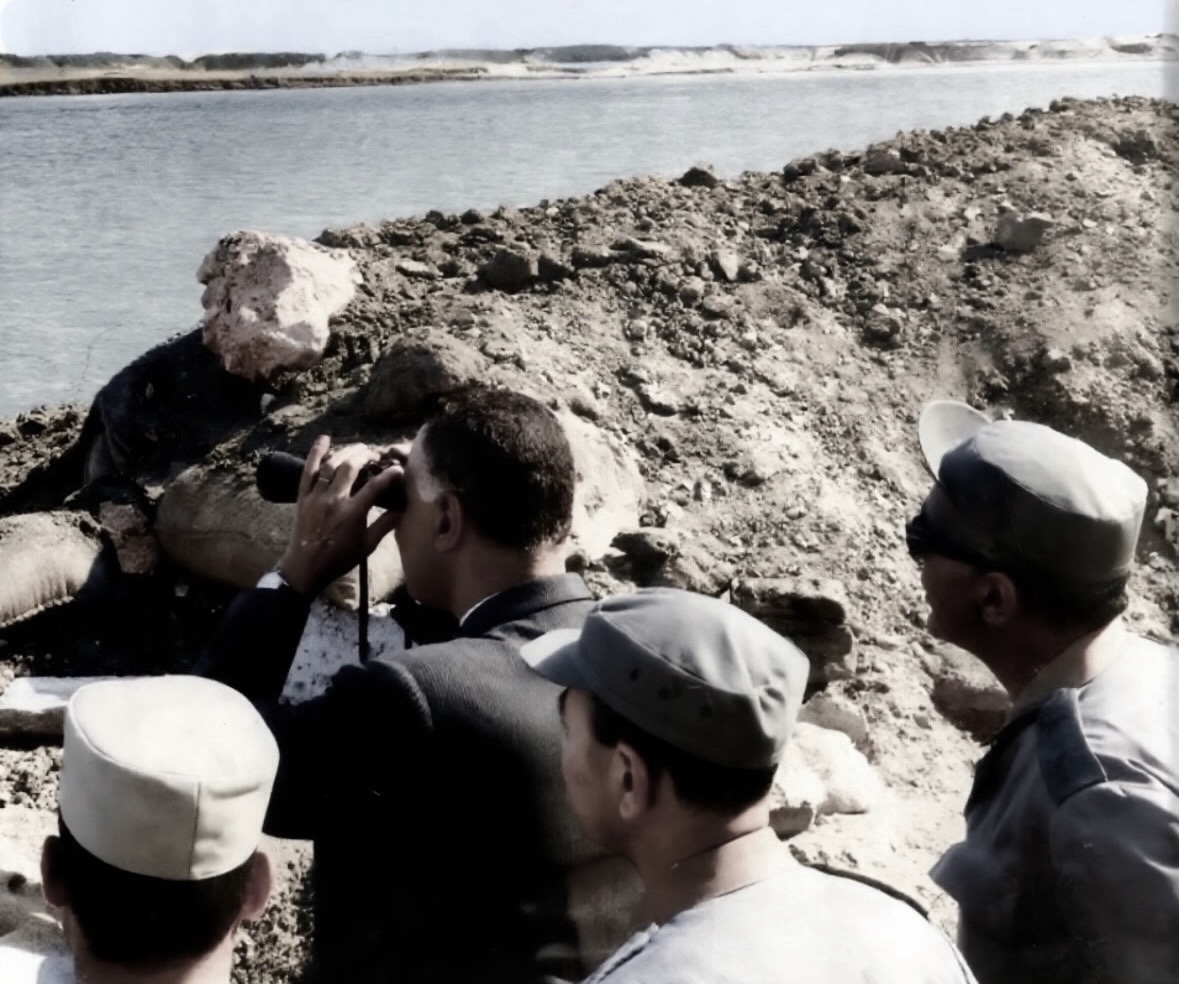
President Nasser's visit to the Suez front with Egypt's top military commanders during the War of Attrition. Directly behind him is General Commander Mohamed Fawzi and to his left Chief of Staff Abdul Munim Riad, 16 November 1968.

After the Israeli victory in the Six-Day War, Egypt waged a War of Attrition against the Israelis across the canal from 1967 to 1970, in coordination with Jordan and the Palestine Liberation Organization. Hostilities initially took the form of limited artillery duels and small-scale incursions into Sinai, but by 1969, the Egyptian Army judged itself prepared for larger-scale operations. On March 8, 1969, Nasser proclaimed the official launch of the War of Attrition, characterized by large-scale shelling along the Suez Canal, extensive aerial warfare and commando raids. Hostilities continued until August 1970 and ended with a ceasefire. The frontiers remained the same as when the war began, with no real commitment to serious peace negotiations.

== Yom Kippur War ==
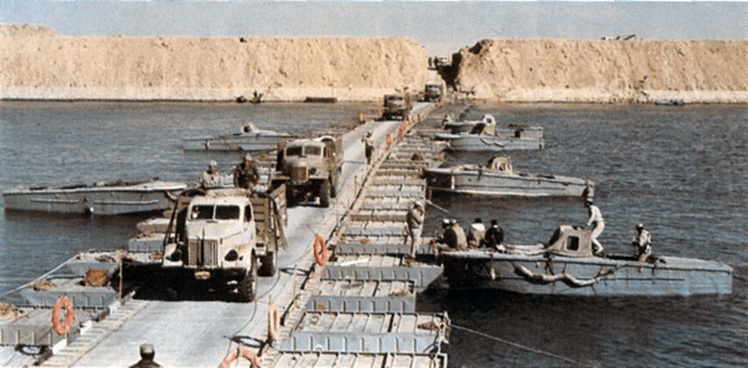
Egypt crossing the Suez Canal during the Yom Kippur War

On 6 October 1973, Egypt and Syria began the Yom Kippur War with an attempt to take back the entire Sinai Peninsula and the Golan Heights from the Israelis, by crossing the Suez Canal in Operation Badr. The attempt partly succeeded in that Egypt regained control of the east bank of the canal, but Israel retained control of the rest of the Sinai Peninsula.

== Re-opening ==
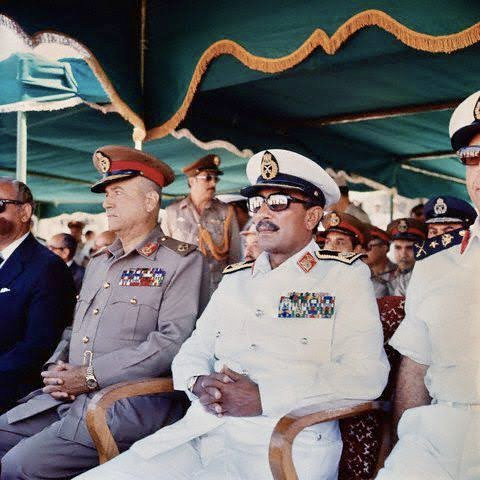
President Anwar Sadat and Minister of Defense Ahmed Ismail in the re-opening ceremony of the Canal, June 5, 1975

After the Yom Kippur War with inconclusive results, the canal opened again in a ceremony attended by Egyptian President Anwar Sadat, senior members of the government and foreign dignitaries in June 1975 after the 1974 Suez Canal Clearance Operation cleared the canal of mines and debris.

== See also ==
- Bab al-Mandab Strait
- Houthi takeover of Yemen
- Closure of the Suez Canal (1956–1957)
- Yellow Fleet — a group of fifteen ships trapped in the canal from 1967 to 1975 as a result of the Six-Day War
- Operation Abirey-Halev
- Israeli passage through the Suez Canal and Straits of Tiran
- Red Sea crisis
- 2026 Strait of Hormuz crisis
