= Egypt–Israel peace treaty =

Peace Treaty Between the State of Israel and the Arab Republic of Egypt
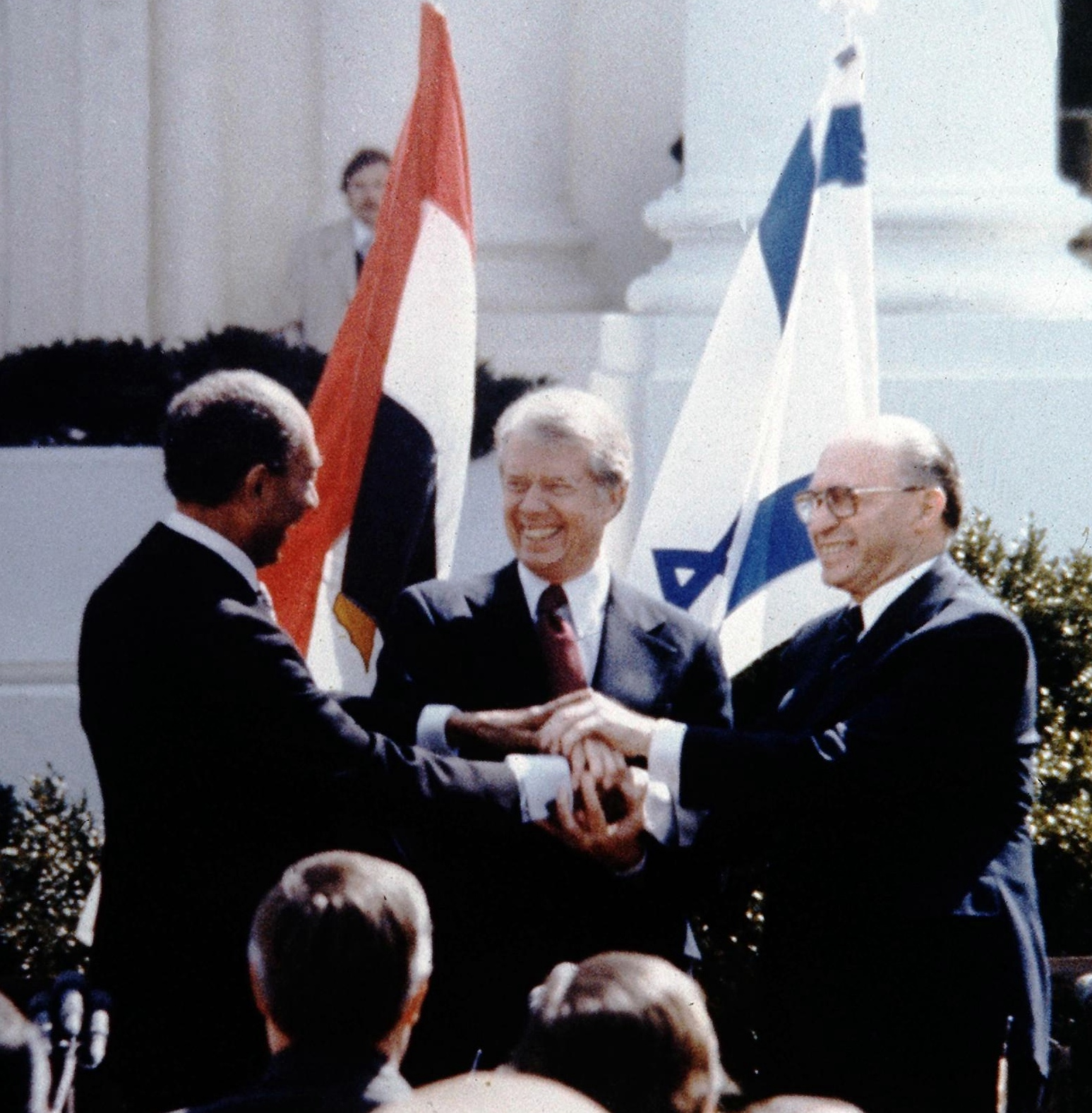
- Sadat, Carter and Begin at the signing ceremony
- Type: Peace treaty
- Signed: 26 March 1979; 47 years ago
- Location: Washington, D.C., US
- Effective: January 1980; 46 years ago
- Signatories: Menachem Begin, Prime Minister of Israel; Anwar Sadat, President of Egypt; Jimmy Carter, President of the United States
- Depositary: Secretary-General of the United Nations
- Citations: UNTS 17813
- Language: English

The Egypt–Israel peace treaty was signed in Washington, D.C., United States, on 26 March 1979, following the 1978 Camp David Accords. The treaty was signed by Anwar Sadat, President of Egypt, and Menachem Begin, Prime Minister of Israel, and witnessed by Jimmy Carter, President of the United States.

== History ==
The peace treaty between Egypt and Israel was signed 16 months after Egyptian president Anwar Sadat's visit to Jerusalem in 1977, after intense negotiations. The main features of the treaty were mutual recognition, cessation of the state of war that had existed since the 1948 Arab–Israeli War, normalization of relations and the withdrawal by Israel of its armed forces and civilians from the Sinai Peninsula, which Israel had captured during the Six-Day War in 1967. Egypt agreed to leave the Sinai Peninsula demilitarized. The agreement provided for free passage of Israeli ships through the Suez Canal, and recognition of the Strait of Tiran and the Gulf of Aqaba as international waterways, which had been blockaded by Egypt in 1967. The agreement also called for an end to Israeli military rule over the Israeli-occupied territories and the establishment of full autonomy for the Palestinian inhabitants of the territories, terms that were not implemented but which became the basis for the Oslo Accords.

The agreement notably made Egypt the first Arab state to officially recognize Israel, although it has been described as a "cold peace".

== Compliance ==
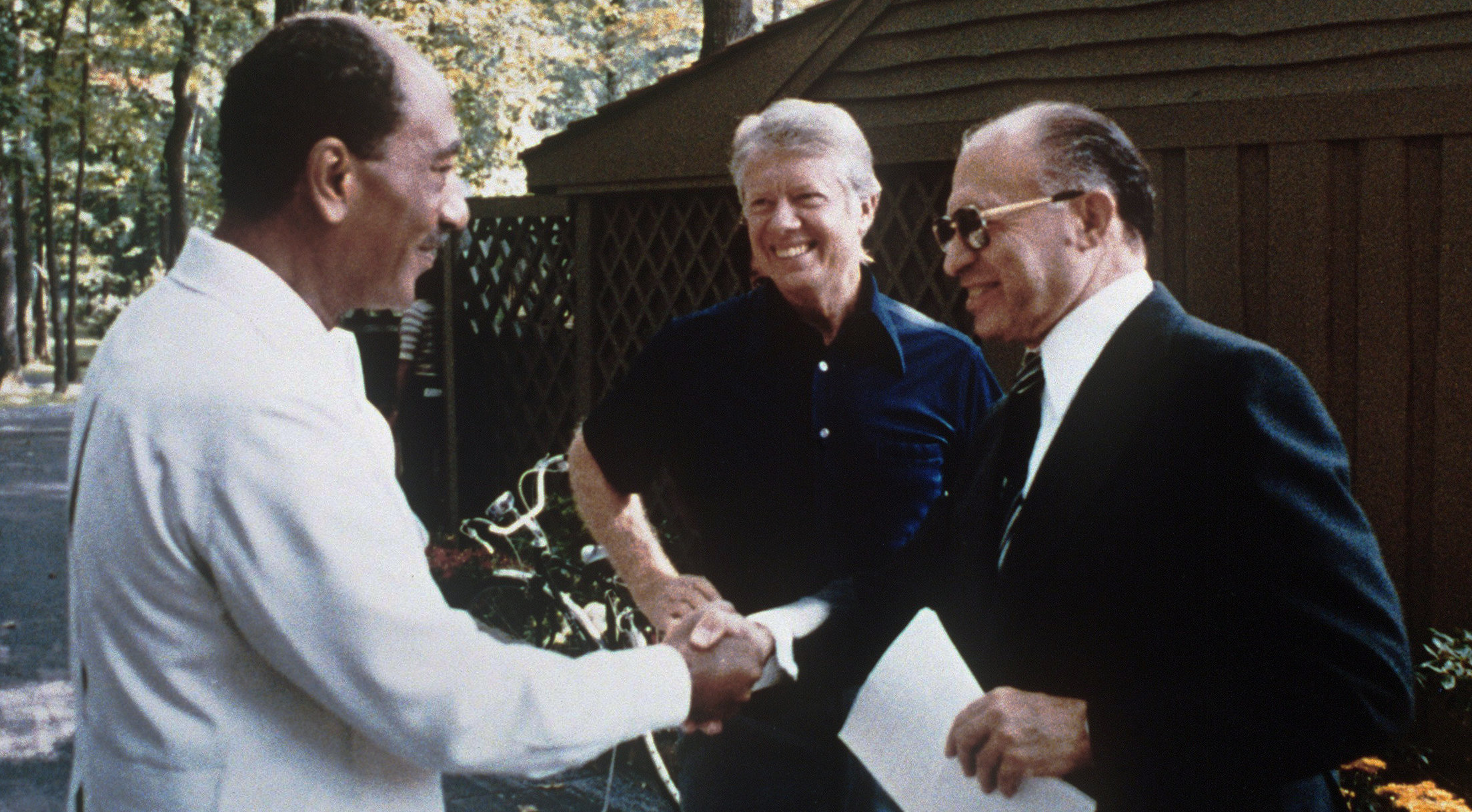
Menachem Begin, Jimmy Carter and Anwar Sadat at Camp David, 1978.

=== Normalization ===
The normalization of relations between Israel and Egypt went into effect in January 1980. Ambassadors were exchanged in February. The boycott laws were repealed by Egypt's parliament the same month, and some trade began to develop, albeit less than Israel had hoped for. In March 1980 regular airline flights were inaugurated. Egypt also began supplying Israel with crude oil.

=== Demilitarization of Sinai ===
On 18 May 1981, the President of the United Nations Security Council indicated that the UN would be unable to provide an observation force, due to the threat of a veto of the motion by the Soviet Union. As a result of the impasse, Egypt, Israel and the United States opened negotiations to set up a peacekeeping organization outside the framework of the UN. On 3 August 1981, the Protocol to the Treaty of Peace was signed, establishing the Multinational Force and Observers (MFO). This observation force monitors both parties to ensure compliance with the treaty.

=== Agreed Activities Mechanism ===
The peace treaty includes a stipulation, called the Agreed Activities Mechanism, that allows Egypt and Israel to jointly alter the arrangements of Egyptian troops in the Sinai without having to officially review the treaty itself. Israel has allowed Egypt to deploy forces to central and eastern Sinai out of mutual security concerns, such as the presence of jihadi militant groups in these areas. These alterations are coordinated through the MFO.

In January 2011, during widespread protests by Egyptians against their government, Israel agreed to allow Egypt to move several hundred troops into the Sinai Peninsula for the first time since the peace treaty was signed. With Israel's agreement, Egypt moved two battalions, about 800 soldiers, into the Sharm el-Sheikh area on Sinai's southern tip, far from Israel.

In August 2012, Israel agreed that Egypt could deploy additional forces, including attack helicopters, in the northern Sinai to combat militants who had carried out an attack on Egyptian border guards that left 16 dead. Later that month, Egypt moved additional heavy weaponry into the demilitarized zone without Israeli approval, in violation of the peace treaty terms. Egypt said that the deployment of these troops and weapons was in keeping with agreements reached with Israel in 2011. Israel reportedly asked the United States to mediate this dispute. Shortly thereafter, Egyptian defense minister Abdel Fattah el-Sisi reportedly assured his Israeli counterpart, Ehud Barak, that Egypt was committed to maintaining the 1979 Camp David peace treaty with Israel.

In July 2013, after a number of violent incidents in the Sinai Peninsula, Israel agreed to the deployment of additional Egyptian troops.

=== Free Navigation of Waterways ===
During the wars that pitted Egypt against Israel, the Egyptian government closed the Suez Canal on two separate occasions (between 1956 and 1957 and between 1967 and 1975), with severe economic repercussions for local commerce and global trade alike. The Egypt–Israel peace treaty thus also aimed to avoid further crises involving the key waterway in the future. According to the treaty's fifth article, Israeli ships and ships destined to or coming from Israel are entitled to the right of free passage through the Suez Canal and the neighboring areas (the Gulf of Suez and the Mediterranean Sea) on the basis of the Constantinople Convention of 1888. Both Egypt and Israel agreed to recognize the Strait of Tiran and the Gulf of Aqaba as being international waterways, where any nation may enjoy freedom of navigation and overflight. In order to facilitate this process, international peacekeeping forces were deployed to the Suez Canal by the United Nations. Later, these were replaced by the Multinational Force and Observers (MFO), which remains active to this day.

== Aftermath ==
=== Reaction in the Arab world ===
This treaty was received with enormous controversy across the Arab world, where it was condemned and considered a stab in the back. The sense of outrage was particularly strong amongst Palestinians, with the leader of the Palestine Liberation Organization, Yasser Arafat, stating: "Let them sign what they like. False peace will not last". On the other hand, the treaty led both Egyptian president Anwar Sadat and Israeli prime minister Menachem Begin to share the 1978 Nobel Peace Prize for bringing peace between the two states. In order to regain legitimacy in the eyes of the other Muslim-majority countries after the peace treaty with Israel, Egypt appealed to Islamic justifications based on the sacred scriptures of Islam to facilitate its efforts to describe its innovative peace policy, and simultaneously to refute the anti-peace campaign led by Islamist organizations in the Arab world and the Middle East.

However, as a result of the treaty, Egypt was suspended from the Arab League in 1979–1989, and Sadat was assassinated on 6 October 1981 by members of the Egyptian Islamic Jihad. Syrian President Hafez al-Assad severed all relations with Egypt after the signing of the peace deal, and diplomatic relations were not re-established until 2005, when Egypt once again enjoyed warm relations with Syria under the rule of Bashar al-Assad.

=== Long-term effects in Egypt ===
The peace between Egypt and Israel has lasted since the treaty went into effect, and Egypt has become an important strategic partner of Israel. Binyamin Ben-Eliezer, a former Israeli defense minister known for his close ties to Egyptian officials, has stated that "Egypt is not only our closest friend in the region, the co-operation between us goes beyond the strategic."

As part of the agreement, the U.S. began economic and military aid to Egypt, and political backing for its subsequent governments. From the Camp David peace accords in 1978 until 2000, the United States has subsidized Egypt's armed forces with over $38 billion worth of aid. Egypt receives about $1.3 billion annually.

Nevertheless, the peace is often described as a "cold peace", with many in Egypt skeptical about its effectiveness. The Arab-Israeli conflict has kept relations cool.

The Egyptian revolution of 2011 led to fears in Israel about the future of the treaty, although the Israeli prime minister Benjamin Netanyahu stated that he expected any new Egyptian government to keep the peace treaty with Israel, as it has served both countries well. After the Egyptian Army took power on 11 February 2011, it announced that Egypt would continue to abide by all its international and regional treaties. However, Ayman Nour, an influential Egyptian opposition figure and likely presidential candidate called for Cairo's peace treaty with Israel to be "reassessed". On 15 September 2011, the then Egyptian prime minister Essam Sharaf said that "A peace deal with Israel was not sacred". Rashad al-Bayumi, the deputy chief of Egypt's largest party, the Muslim Brotherhood, said that they would not recognize Israel and that the treaty could be put to a referendum, emphasizing that while they respected all of their international agreements, they "had the right to review the peace deal" and that the Egyptian people "have yet to speak their mind". Representatives of the group had told U.S. diplomats that they did not intend to revoke the treaty.

Addressing Israeli concerns on 31 July 2014, Egyptian president Abdel Fattah el-Sisi pledged to continue the peace with Israel.

During the Gaza War of 2023–2025, Israel violated the treaty by taking control of the Philadelphi Corridor. Israel stated that Hamas had been smuggling weapons through the corridor. Egypt denied this claim and also rejected the appointment of a new Israeli ambassador in September 2024.

== See also ==
- 1949 Armistice Agreements
- Israel–Jordan Treaty of Peace (1994)
- List of Middle East peace proposals
- Oslo Accords (1993)
- Yamit
