= Suez Crisis =

1956 British–French–Israeli invasion of Egypt

- Part of the Cold War and the Arab–Israeli conflict
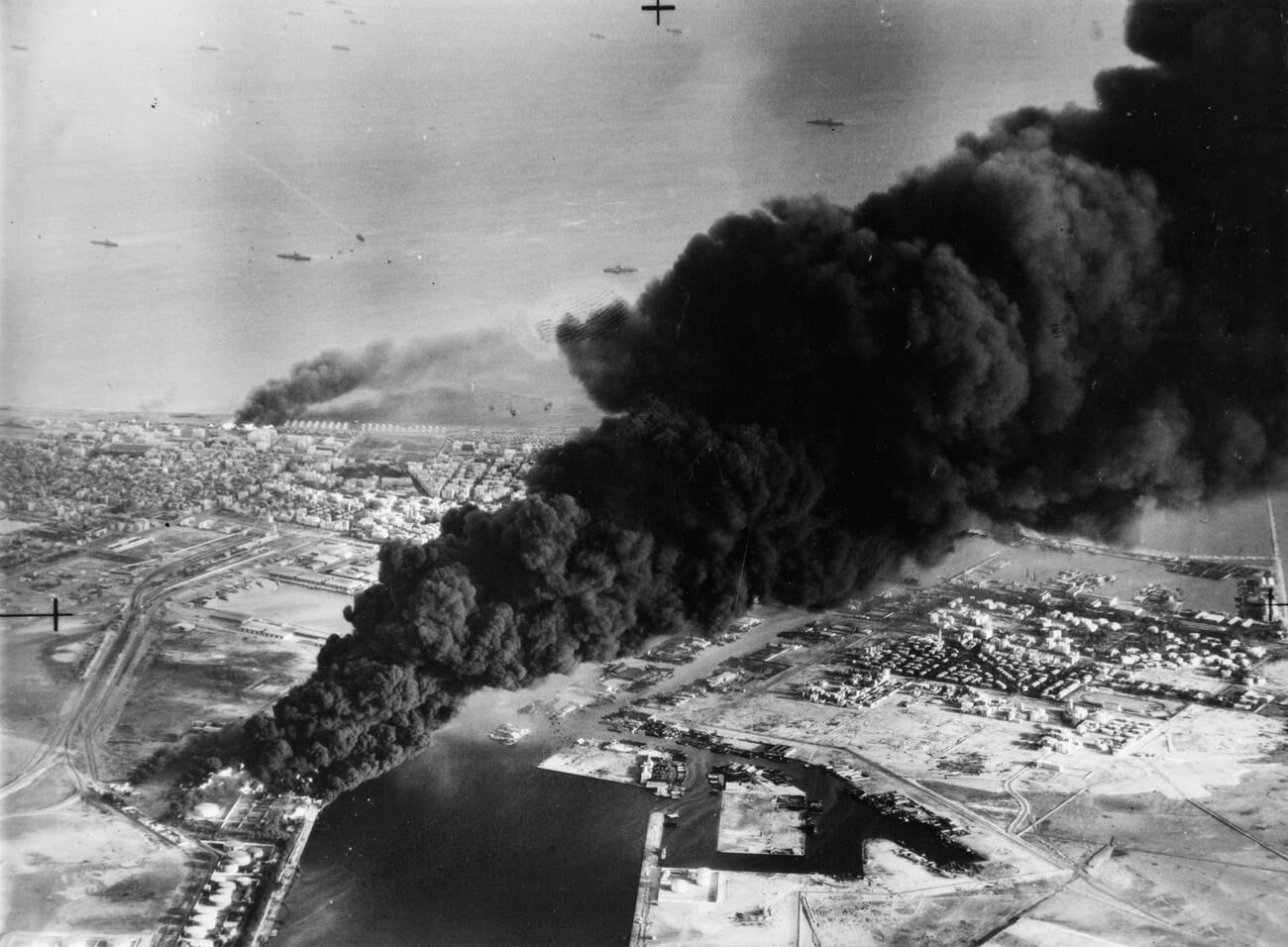
- Smoke rising from oil tanks on the Suez Canal, hit during the initial Anglo-French assault on Port Said
Date	29 October – 7 November 1956 (1 week and 2 days)
Location	Egypt (from the Gaza Strip to the Suez Canal)
Result	See § Aftermath
Territorial changes	Israeli occupation of the Sinai Peninsula and the Gaza Strip until March 1957

Belligerents
Israel; United Kingdom; France	Egypt

Commanders and leaders
David Ben-Gurion; Moshe Dayan; Asaf Simhoni †; Haim Bar-Lev; Avraham Yoffe; Israel Tal; Ariel Sharon; Uri Ben-Ari; Anthony Eden; Gerald Templer; Charles Keightley; Hugh Stockwell; Denis Barnett; Manley Power; René Coty; Guy Mollet; Pierre Barjot; André Beaufre; Jacques Massu	Gamal Abdel Nasser; Abdel Hakim Amer; Saadedden Mutawally; Sami Yassa; Jaafar al-Abd; Salahedin Moguy; Raouf Mahfouz Zaki

Strength
175,000; 45,000; 34,000	90,000

Casualties and losses
Israel: 172 killed; 817 wounded; 1 captured; United Kingdom: 22 killed; 96 wounded; France: 10 killed; 33 wounded	1,650–3,000 killed; 4,900 wounded; 5,000–30,000+ captured; 215+ aircraft destroyed; 125 tanks destroyed
- 1,000 civilians killed

The Suez Crisis, (Note: French: Crise du canal de Suez; Arabic: أزمة السويس; Hebrew: מַשְׁבֵּר תְּעָלַת סוּאֵץ) also known as the second Arab–Israeli war, the Tripartite Aggression (Note: Arabic: العدوان الثلاثي, romanised: Al-ʿUdwān aṯ-Ṯulāṯiyy) in the Arab world and the Sinai War (Note: Hebrew: מִלְחֶמֶת סִינַי, romanised: Milkhemeth Sinai, lit. 'Battle of Sinai') in Israel, (Note: Other names include the Suez Canal Crisis, Suez War, 1956 War, Suez–Sinai war, 1956 Arab–Israeli war, Suez Campaign, and Sinai Campaign.) was a British–French–Israeli invasion of Egypt in 1956. Israel invaded on 29 October, with the primary objective of re-opening the Straits of Tiran and the Gulf of Aqaba as the recent tightening of the eight-year-long Egyptian blockade prevented Israeli passage. After issuing a joint ultimatum for a ceasefire, the United Kingdom and France joined the Israelis on 31 October in an attempt to depose Egyptian President Gamal Abdel Nasser and regain control of the Suez Canal (which Nasser had nationalised earlier that year). (Note: From an Intelligence perspective and according to CIA original operative, Miles Copeland, CIA's internal and external disagreements (with its British counterparts) of the impending Suez Crisis rendered it indecisive by the western powers; Copeland described the uncoordination with British Intelligence at the time as "Our British counterparts were apparently in ignorance of what my CIA team had been doing in Cairo during the previous two years". And the only political move of Nasser that the CIA did not acknowledge preemptively (against Frank Wisner's insistences): "Secretary Dulles failed to understand rule number one: 'you can hardly win a game if you don't even know you're in one.' But a winning strategy can come to a sad end if it fails to take into account radical changes in the gameboard itself. Nasser used to say, 'I don't act; I only react.' That made it easy for us—what the hell, let's not mince words: made it easy for me. (one can be too self-effacing, you know.) Oh, yes, there was one move of Nasser's which Kim and I both failed to predict. When Secretary Dulles announced that we weren't going to help Nasser with his Aswan Dam, we were called to a meeting at the State Department to help figure out how he would react. There were many suggestions, but only Frank Wisner, our beloved boss, mentioned the possibility of Nasser's nationalizing the Suez Canal Company. Kim and I both kicked him under the table (we loved Frank, and didn't want him to make a fool of himself), but he persisted as one or another of the State Department people sitting around the table explained to him, patronizingly, why such an action was unlikely. Well, as everybody now knows, Nasser did eventually nationalize the canal company (not the canal itself, as has been erroneously reported, but the company), and Frank called us to his office to crow. 'When you come', he said, 'would you please bring your notes on the State Department meeting.' Frank was in high I-told-you-so spirits—until he looked through the notes seeking a reference to his prediction. He couldn't find it! 'Don't you remember?' he said, his voice rising. 'I said two or three times how I thought Nasser might nationalize the canal company.' Kim looked at me; I looked at Kim. 'Frank, I don't remember you saying anything like that. Do you, Miles?' 'I didn't hear him,' I said to Kim, then to Frank, 'Are you sure you didn't just think about suggesting it? After all, it would have been a very prescient suggestion, but ...' 'You know I said it!' Frank kept insisting, but Kim and I, with bewildered looks on our faces, kept saying that we didn't remember. It was a dirty trick, and we've had guilty thoughts about it often, especially after Frank died of his own hand less than a year later after seeing his pet operation, the revolution in Hungary, go sour. I would like to go on record as saying that Frank Wisner unknown to most Americans, was a truly great man and a perfect boss. Stewart Alsop said that he 'died as much a victim of war as any soldier killed in battle', and his friends and underlings were 100 per cent in agreement." "When nationalization of the Canal Company was announced, the British immediately took and held the initiatives. We played along with them despite our awareness that British intelligence, for all its superior competence throughout the rest of the Middle East, was grossly uninformed on all that had been going on inside the Nasser government and on the general situation in Egypt. In one of the what-to-do-about-Nasser meetings some of my CIA colleagues and I had with SIS officers a month or so before the Anglo—French—Israeli attack on Egypt, an officer showed me a highly secret document purporting to be a chart showing the organization of the Mukhabarat, the Egyptian intelligence service. I thought he was pulling my leg! It was the chart my BA&H colleagues and I had drawn up, translated from the Arabic into what we Americans liked to call 'Anglicized English'. The interesting part was the list of the section heads, all friends of mine, some of them misspelled, some without first names, and some entirely wrong due to faulty interpretation of footnotes. Our British counterparts were apparently in ignorance of what my CIA team had been doing in Cairo during the previous two years. What bothered us most, however, was the fact that the British weren't reacting at all like seasoned, cold-blooded gameplayers. Everything our colleagues in SIS and the Foreign Office said to us showed that they had no information that made any sense at all on which Egyptian officers or civilians might constitute a new government if Nasser were to be eliminated, or on the general situation inside Egypt. They were only guessing and making assumptions. And they didn't seem to care. They thought they should just get rid of Nasser, hang the practical consequences, just to show the world that an upstart like him couldn't get away with so ostentatiously twisting the lion's tail. It was as though a chess Grand Master, embarrassed at having been outmaneuvered by an opponent whom he considered an inferior player, wanted to kick over the table.") The countries came under heavy political pressure from the United States, the Soviet Union and the United Nations, prompting their withdrawal from Egypt.

The crisis demonstrated that the United Kingdom and France could no longer implement independent foreign policies without U.S. consent. Israel's four-month-long occupation of the Egyptian-occupied Gaza Strip and Egypt's Sinai Peninsula enabled it to freely navigate the Straits of Tiran, but the Suez Canal was closed from October 1956 to March 1957.

The crisis strengthened Nasser's standing, internationally humiliating the British (as historians questioned its role as a superpower) and the French during the Cold War. The UN established an emergency force to police the Egypt–Israel border. For his diplomatic efforts to resolve the conflict through the UN, Canadian external-affairs minister Lester B. Pearson received the Nobel Peace Prize. Analysts have said that the crisis may have emboldened the USSR, facilitating the Soviet invasion of Hungary.

== Background ==
=== Before 1945 ===
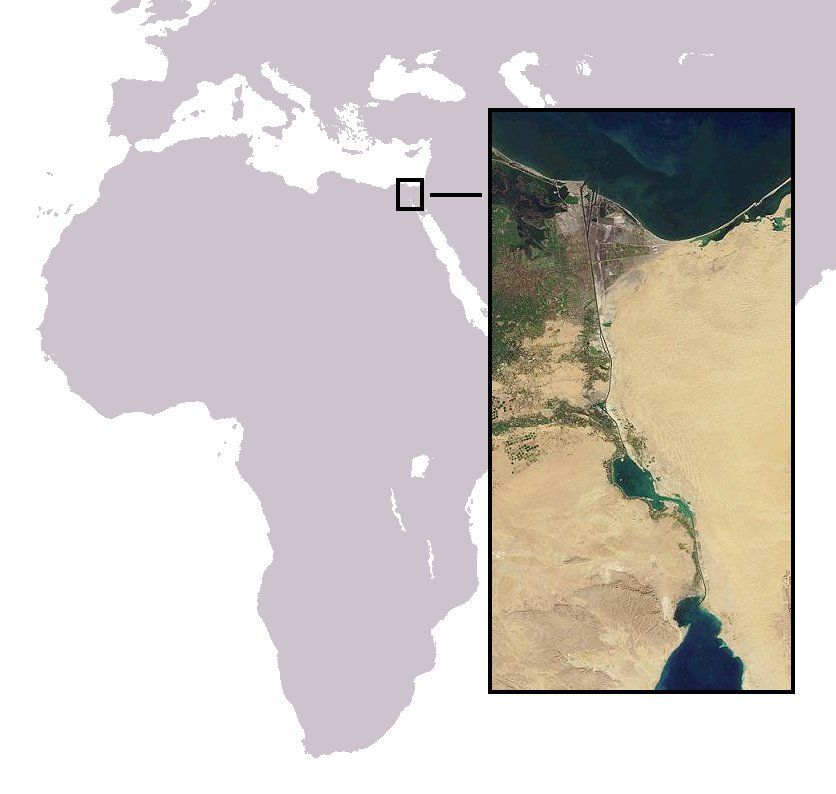
The Suez Canal connects the Mediterranean and the Indian Ocean via the Red Sea.

The Suez Canal opened in 1869, financed by the French and Egyptian governments. The canal was operated by the Suez Company, an Egyptian-chartered company; the area surrounding the canal remained Egyptian territory. The canal was strategically important, as it provided the shortest ocean link between the Mediterranean Sea and the Indian Ocean.

In 1875, as a result of a financial crisis, Egypt sold its shares in the company to the British government. They obtained a 44-percent share in the company for £4 million (equivalent to £399 million in 2025). With the 1882 invasion and occupation of Egypt, the UK took de facto control of the country and the canal. The 1888 Convention of Constantinople declared the canal a neutral zone under British protection, and the Ottoman Empire agreed to permit international shipping to pass freely through the canal.

Despite the convention, Britain closed the canal several times. During the 1904–05 Russo-Japanese War, the British denied the Russian Baltic Fleet use of the canal after the Dogger Bank incident and forced it to sail around Africa (giving the Imperial Japanese Armed Forces time to consolidate their position). During the First World War, Britain and France closed the canal to non-Allied shipping. During World War II, Britain stationed warships in the Suez Canal and used it to move Allied troops and military supplies, while neutral shipping was limited. In 1942, Axis forces advanced towards the Suez Canal, but Allied forces halted their offensive in July.

=== 1945–1952 ===
After World War II, Britain's Suez complex was one of the world's largest military installations. The base was an important part of Britain's strategic position in the Middle East, but became a source of growing tension in Anglo-Egyptian relations.

The canal's strategic importance for oil shipment continued after the war. Western Europe imported two million barrels daily from the Middle East: 1,200,000 by tanker through the canal, and another 800,000 via pipeline from the Persian Gulf (Trans-Arabian Pipeline) and Kirkuk (Kirkuk-Baniyas pipeline) to the Mediterranean. The pipelines were prone to instability, and British leaders preferred the sea route through the canal.

Egypt's domestic politics were changing radically. Unrest began with the growth of radical political groups, such as the Muslim Brotherhood in Egypt, and an increasingly-hostile attitude towards Britain and its presence. Added to the anti-British fervour was the role Britain had played in the creation of Israel.

The Egyptian government unilaterally abrogated the Anglo-Egyptian treaty of 1936, whose terms gave Britain a lease on the Suez base for 20 more years, in October 1951. Britain refused to withdraw from Suez, relying on the treaty and its Suez garrison.

=== 1952 Egyptian revolution ===
In January 1952, British forces tried to disarm an auxiliary-police barracks in Ismailia; 41 Egyptians died. This led to anti-Western riots in Cairo, resulting in property damage and the deaths of foreigners. This was a catalyst for the removal of the Egyptian monarchy. On 23 July 1952, a military coup by the Egyptian nationalist Free Officers movement led by Muhammad Neguib and Gamal Abdul Nasser overthrew King Farouk. After a brief regency under the infant Fuad II, the monarchy was replaced by the Republic of Egypt.

=== After the revolution ===
==== Egypt and the United States ====
American policy was torn between the desire to maintain good relations with NATO allies (such as Britain and France, major colonial powers) and aligning Third World nationalists such as Nasser, who resented British and French influence, with the Free World. The Eisenhower administration saw the Near East as a gap into which Soviet influence could project, which required an American-supported NATO-type organisation (the Middle East Treaty Organization, or METO). The CIA offered Nasser $3 million if he would join the defence organization; Nasser took the money, but did not join.

John Foster Dulles told Eisenhower in May 1953 that the Arab states believed that the United States would back Israel in expansion, and the prestige of Western democracy in the Middle East was low. The consequence was a new policy of "even-handedness", where the United States publicly sided with the Arab states in disputes with Israel and Britain from 1953 to 1955. Nasser wanted the United States to supply Egypt with arms, but his anti-Zionism made it difficult for the Eisenhower administration to obtain Congressional approval for weapons sales.

==== Egypt and Britain ====
Britain's desire to mend Anglo-Egyptian relations in the wake of the coup led to an attempt at rapprochement in 1953-54. In October 1954, Britain and Egypt concluded the Anglo-Egyptian Agreement on the phased evacuation of British troops from the Suez base. Great Britain would withdraw all troops within 20 months, maintain the base, and retain a right to return for seven years. The Suez Company would revert to the Egyptian government in 1968.

==== Baghdad Pact ====
Under Nasser, Egypt saw the Middle East as Egypt's sphere of influence and opposed Western security initiatives in the region. Nasser and Iraqi prime minister Nuri al-Said vied for Arab leadership. The 1955 Baghdad Pact (later the Central Treaty Organization), an anti-Communist alliance of Pakistan, Iran, Turkey, Iraq and the UK, seemed to confirm Nasser's fears that Britain was trying to draw the eastern Arab World into a bloc centred on Iraq. The pact was almost simultaneous with 28 February 1955 Israeli reprisal operations on the Gaza Strip during the Palestinian Fedayeen insurgency.

The closeness of the two events was mistakenly interpreted by Nasser as part of a coordinated Western effort to push him into joining the Baghdad Pact. The signing of the pact and the Gaza raid were the beginning of the end of Nasser's good relations with the U.S. In 1955 and 1956, he pursued policies which would frustrate British aims in the Middle East and result in increasing hostility between Britain and Egypt. Nasser also began to align Egypt with Saudi Arabia, whose rulers were hereditary enemies of the Hashemites, in an effort to frustrate British efforts to draw Syria, Jordan and Lebanon into the Baghdad Pact.

==== Egypt and the communist world ====
Nasser first broached the subject of buying weapons from the Soviet Union in 1954 to encourage the Americans into selling him arms. Instead of siding with either superpower, Nasser tried to have them compete for his friendship. During secret talks with the Soviets in 1955, his demands for weapons were granted. The September news of the Egyptian purchase of a large quantity of Soviet arms via Czechoslovakia was seen by the West as an increase in Soviet influence in the Near East. In Britain, increasing Soviet influence was seen as a threat to British influence in the region.

==== Egypt and Israel ====
Before 1955, Nasser pursued peace efforts with Israel and worked to prevent cross-border Palestinian attacks. After the February 1955 Israeli raid on Egyptian Army headquarters in Gaza in retaliation for a Palestinian fedayeen attack which killed an Israeli civilian, Nasser began allowing raids into Israel by Palestinian militants. Egypt established fedayeen bases in Gaza, Jordan and Lebanon. The raids triggered a series of Israeli reprisal operations.

Israel wanted to occupy and annex the Gaza Strip and the Sinai and control the Gulf of Aqaba. The Israelis were concerned about Egypt's procurement of large amounts of Soviet weaponry, which altered an already-shaky balance of power. Israel believed that it had a narrow window of opportunity to hit Egypt's army, and believed that Egypt had a secret alliance with Jordan and Syria.

==== Egypt and France ====
France and Israel were allied against Egypt, partially due to Egyptian support of the Algerian National Liberation Front (FLN) rebels against the French. The French saw Nasser as a major threat. By early 1955, France was shipping large amounts of weapons to Israel and, by 1956, agreed to disregard the Tripartite Declaration and supply more weapons to Israel. In 1956, Israeli director general of defence Shimon Peres told the French that Israel had decided upon war with Egypt that year. Peres described Nasser as a genocidal maniac intent on destroying Israel and exterminating its people; Israel wanted a war before Egypt received more Soviet weapons, when an Israeli victory was still possible.

== Egyptian policies in 1956 ==
In January 1956, to end an arms race between Egypt (armed by the Soviet Union) and Israel (armed by France) which he saw as opening the Near East to Soviet influence, Eisenhower launched an effort to make peace between Egypt and Israel. He sent his friend Robert B. Anderson, who offered American aid in exchange for a peace treaty with Israel, as a secret envoy. Nasser and Israeli prime minister David Ben-Gurion had conflicting demands, and the meetings were unsuccessful.

A second round of secret diplomacy by Anderson in February 1956 was equally unsuccessful. It is unclear if Nasser was interested in peace or saying what the Americans wanted to hear in the hope of obtaining American funding for the Aswan High Dam and American weapons. British historian P. J. Vatikitos said that Nasser's determination to promote Egypt as the world's foremost anti-Zionist state to reinforce his claim to Arab leadership meant that peace was unlikely.

Nasser sponsored demonstrations in Amman which led King Hussein of Jordan to dismiss the British Commander of the Arab Legion, John Bagot Glubb (known to the Arabs as Glubb Pasha), in March 1956. After Glubb was sacked, British prime minister Anthony Eden developed an antipathy against Nasser and was privately committed to his removal. A British politician recalled,

For Eden ... this was the last straw.... This reverse, he insisted was Nasser's doing. ... Nasser was our Enemy No. 1 in the Middle East and he would not rest until he destroyed all our friends and eliminated the last vestiges of our influence. ... Nasser must therefore be ... destroyed.

American historian Donald Neff wrote that Eden's hysterical, overwrought views of Nasser reflected the amphetamines to which he became addicted after a botched operation in 1953 and sustained sleep deprivation; Eden slept an average of about five hours per night in early 1956. Nasser recognised the People's Republic of China on 16 May 1956, which angered the U.S. and Secretary Dulles. This move, and his impression that the project was beyond Egypt's economic capabilities, caused Eisenhower to withdraw American financial aid for the Aswan Dam project on 19 July.

== Nationalisation of the Suez Canal ==
Nasser announces the nationalisation of the canal (Universal Newsreel, 30 July 1956).

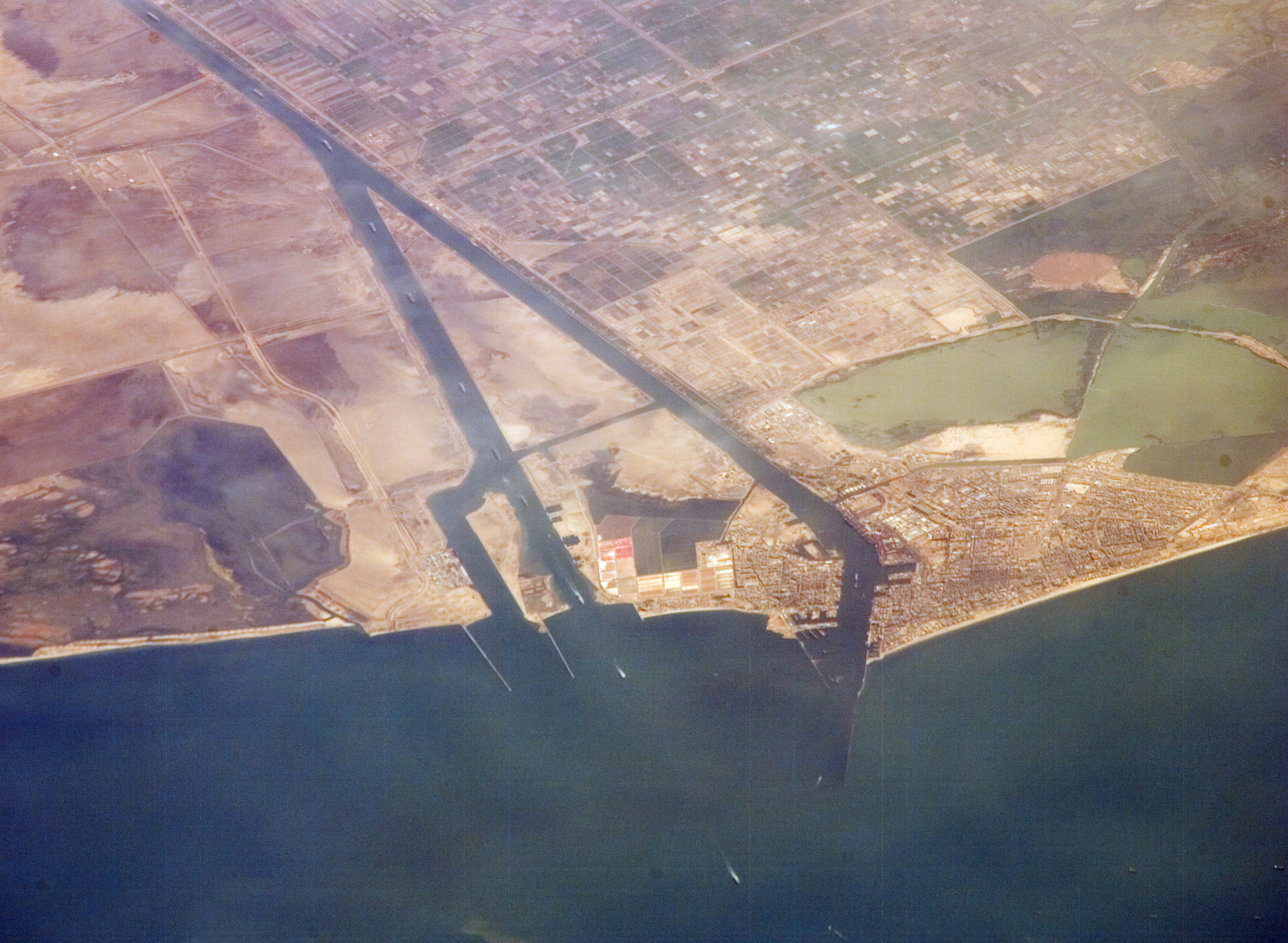
Port Said, at the Mediterranean entrance to the Suez Canal

In a 26 July 1956 speech in Alexandria, Nasser announced the nationalisation of the canal; he used the name of Ferdinand de Lesseps, who built the canal, as a code word ordering Egyptian forces to seize control of the canal. Egypt closed the canal (and the Straits of Tiran) to Israeli shipping, and blockaded the Gulf of Aqaba in contravention of the 1888 Convention of Constantinople; it was also said to violate the 1949 Armistice Agreements. Egyptian historian Abd al-Azim Ramadan cited Nasser's decision to nationalise the canal without political consultation as an example of his predilection for solitary decision-making.

=== British response ===
The nationalisation surprised Britain and the Commonwealth; there had been no discussion of the canal at the Commonwealth Prime Ministers' Conference in London in late June and early July. Egypt's action threatened British economic and military interests in the region.

Prime Minister Eden was under domestic pressure from Conservative MPs who compared the events of 1956 with those of the Munich Agreement in 1938. Since the US government did not support the British protests, the British government decided in favour of military intervention against Egypt to keep oil flowing and avoid the collapse of British influence in the region.

Eden hosted a dinner for King Faisal II of Iraq and his prime minister at which opposition leader Hugh Gaitskell was also a guest. Gaitskell agreed that military action might be inevitable, and advised Eden to keep the Americans informed. Eden believed that Parliament would support him, and Gaitskell called the nationalisation a "high-handed and totally unjustifiable step". When Eden made a broadcast about the nationalisation, Labour did not exercise its right to reply.

Gaitskell's support became more cautious. In letters to Eden on 3 and 10 August 1956, he condemned Nasser but warned that he would not support any action that violated the United Nations Charter (including an armed attack).

Two dozen Labour MPs issued an 8 August statement that forcing Nasser to denationalise the canal against Egypt's wishes would violate the UN charter. Former Labour Foreign Minister Herbert Morrison hinted that he would support unilateral action by the government. Jo Grimond, who became leader of the Liberal Party that November, said that if Nasser went unchallenged the Middle East would go his way.

The nationalisation was viewed as a threat to British interests. In a 10 September 1956 letter to the British ambassador, Foreign Office permanent under-secretary Ivone Kirkpatrick wrote:

If we sit back while Nasser consolidates his position and gradually acquires control of the oil-bearing countries, he can and is, according to our information, resolved to wreck us. If Middle Eastern oil is denied to us for a year or two, our gold reserves will disappear. If our gold reserves disappear, the sterling area disintegrates. If the sterling area disintegrates and we have no reserves, we shall not be able to maintain a force in Germany, or indeed, anywhere else. I doubt whether we shall be able to pay for the bare minimum necessary for our defence. And a country that cannot provide for its defence is finished.

=== French response ===
1956 newsreel about Western reactions to the nationalisation (pictured) US secretary of state John Foster Dulles and British foreign secretary Selwyn Lloyd at a London conference

French prime minister Guy Mollet, outraged by Nasser's move, determined that he would not get his way. French public opinion supported Mollet; except for the French Communist Party, criticism of his government came from the right (who doubted that a socialist like Mollet would go to war with Nasser).

On 29 July 1956, the French Cabinet decided on military action against Egypt in alliance with Israel. Britain was informed and invited to co-operate if interested. Mollet was offended by what he considered the lackadaisical attitude of the Eisenhower administration to the nationalisation; France had remained loyal to NATO after the USSR offered it a deal earlier that year in which Paris would remain in NATO but become "semi-neutralist" in the Cold War if Moscow ended its support of the FLN in Algeria.

=== Commonwealth response ===
By 1956, the Panama Canal was more important than the Suez to Australia and New Zealand; however, many called the Suez Canal their "lifeline" to Britain. Australian prime minister Robert Menzies and New Zealand Prime Minister Sidney Holland supported Britain in the first weeks after the seizure. Menzies travelled to London from the United States after hearing about the nationalisation, and became an informal member of the British Cabinet discussing the issue.

The "non-white dominions" saw Egypt's seizure of the canal as an act of anti-imperialism, and Nasser's Arab nationalism as similar to Asian nationalism. Since India was a major user of the canal, Indian prime minister Jawaharlal Nehru remained publicly neutral except for warning that any threats or use of force could be "disastrous". Pakistan was also cautious about supporting Egypt, given their rivalry as leading Islamic nations, but its government said that Nasser had the right to nationalise.

== Diplomatic solutions ==
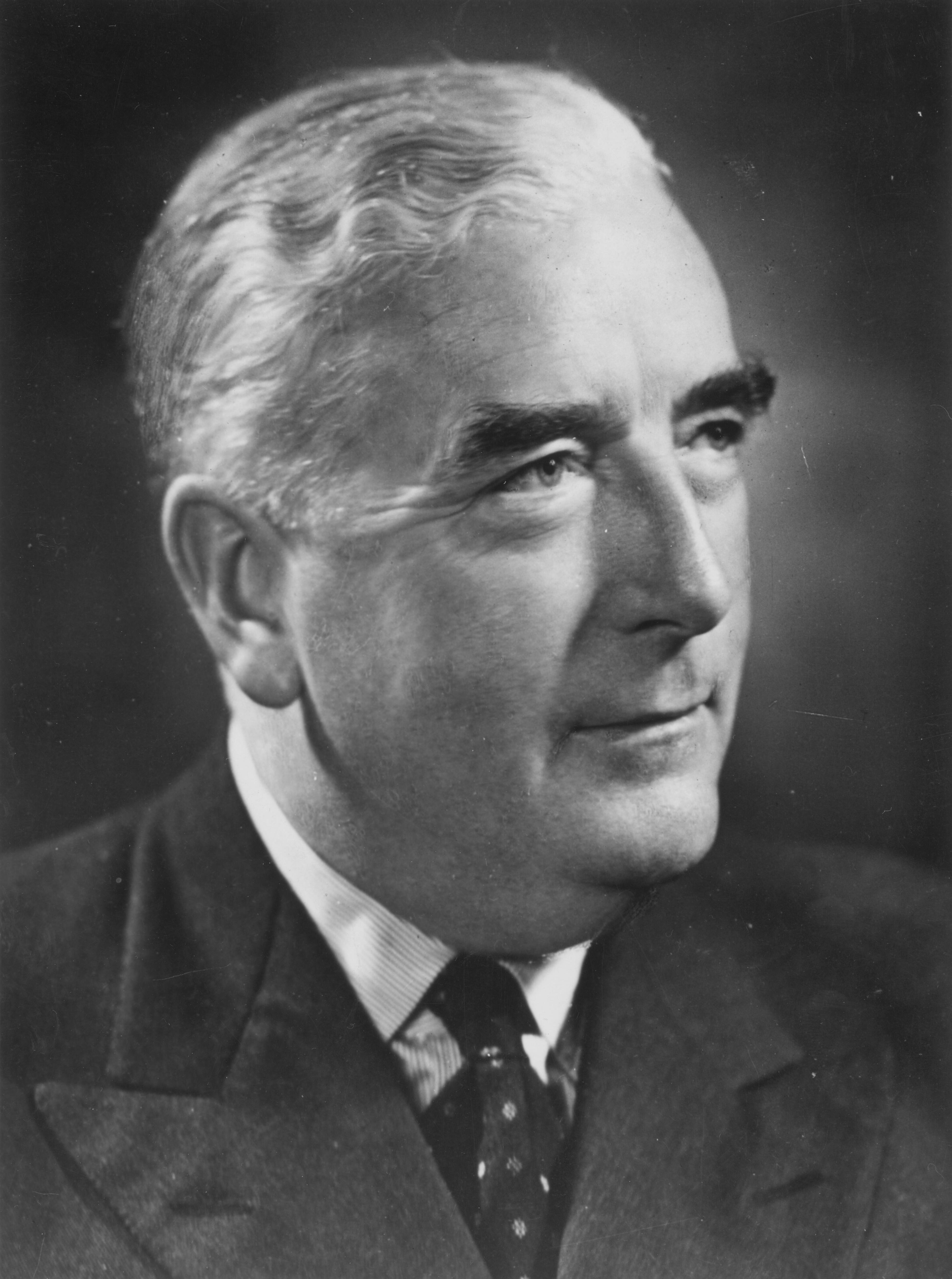
Australian prime minister Robert Menzies led an international committee in futile negotiations with Nasser in September 1956 which sought international management of the Suez Canal.

Almost immediately after nationalisation, Eisenhower suggested to Eden a conference of maritime nations which used the canal. The British wanted to invite the most important countries, but the Americans believed that inviting as many as possible with good publicity would affect world opinion. The eight signatories of the Constantinople Convention and the 16 largest users of the canal were invited: Australia, Ceylon, Denmark, Egypt, Ethiopia, France, West Germany, Greece, India, Indonesia, Iran, Italy, Japan, the Netherlands, New Zealand, Norway, Pakistan, Portugal, Soviet Union, Spain, Sweden, Turkey, the United Kingdom, and the United States. All except Egypt (which sent an observer, and used India and the Soviet Union to represent its interests) and Greece accepted the invitation, and the 22 nations' representatives met in London from 16 to 23 August.

Fifteen of the nations supported the American-British-French position of international operation of the canal. Ceylon, Indonesia, and the Soviet Union supported India's competing proposal—which Nasser had preapproved—of international supervision only. India criticised Egypt's seizure of the canal, but insisted that its ownership and operation remain in Egyptian hands. The majority of 18 chose five nations to negotiate with Nasser in Cairo, led by Menzies, and their proposal for international operation of the canal would go to the Security Council.

Menzies argued to compensation for the Suez Canal Company and the "establishment of principles" for the future use of the canal in a 7 September communique to Nasser. He called for a convention to recognise Egyptian sovereignty of the canal and establish an international body to run the canal. Nasser rejected Menzies' proposals. Menzies hinted to Nasser that Britain and France might use force to resolve the crisis, but the US opposed the use of force and Menzies left Egypt without success.

The United States proposed an association of canal users which would set rules for its operation. Fourteen of the other nations (not including Pakistan) agreed. Britain believed that violation of the association rules would result in military force. Eisenhower believed that the crisis had to be handled peacefully; he told Eden that American public opinion, and the international community, "would be outraged" unless all peaceful routes had been exhausted.

"The British and French reluctantly agreed to pursue the diplomatic avenue but viewed it as merely an attempt to buy time, during which they continued their military preparations." The British disregarded Eisenhower's argument that the American people would not accept a military solution, and doubted that Eisenhower had a determination to avoid war.

== Military preparations ==
=== Anglo-French planning ===
Anthony Eden began planning for an invasion in July 1956. Eden's plan called for the Cyprus-based 16th Independent Parachute Brigade Group to seize the canal zone. The prime minister's plan was rejected by Templer and the other service chiefs, who suggested a sea power-based contingency plan which called for the Royal Marines to take Port Said as a base for three British divisions to overrun the canal zone.

In early August, the plan was modified by including a strategic bombing campaign intended to destroy Egypt's economy, bring about Nasser's overthrow, and achieve air superiority. The 16th Independent Parachute Brigade would lead the assault on Port Said in conjunction with the Royal Marine landing.

This operation (code-named Musketeer) would require thousands of troops, leading the British to seek France as an ally. Instead of Port Said, Musketeer called for the capture of Alexandria. When that city was taken by sea, British armoured divisions would engage in a battle of annihilation south of Alexandria and north of Cairo. To destroy the 300,000-strong Egyptian Army in his planned battle, Hugh Stockwell estimated that he needed 80,000 troops. The most the British Army could spare was 50,000 troops, but the French could supply the necessary 30,000 troops and make up the shortfall.

On 11 August 1956, General Charles Keightley was appointed commander of Musketeer with French Admiral Pierre Barjot as his deputy commander. André Beaufre would command the French forces. Most of the officers of the Anglo-French Task Force expressed regret that it was Beaufre who was Stockwell's deputy, rather than the other way around.

A political and military problem was the one-week interval between sending troops to the eastern Mediterranean and the beginning of the invasion. In late August 1956, Admiral Barjot suggested that Port Said again be made the main target; this lessened the number of troops needed and reduced the interval between sending forces to the eastern Mediterranean and the invasion. Beaufre warned that merely capturing the canal zone was a dangerously-ambiguous goal.

The coming of winter weather to the Mediterranean in late November would render the invasion impossible. An additional problem was Eden, who interfered with the planning and was so obsessed with secrecy that he refused to tell Keightley whether he wanted to retake the Suez Canal, topple Nasser or both.

In early September, Keightley embraced Barjot's idea of seizing Port Said and presented Revise. On 8 September 1956, Revise was approved by the British and French cabinets. Stockwell and Beaufre were opposed to it as an open-ended plan with no clear goal beyond seizing the canal zone, but Revise was supported by Eden and Mollet as offering greater political flexibility and (possibly) fewer Egyptian civilian casualties.

=== Franco-Israeli planning ===
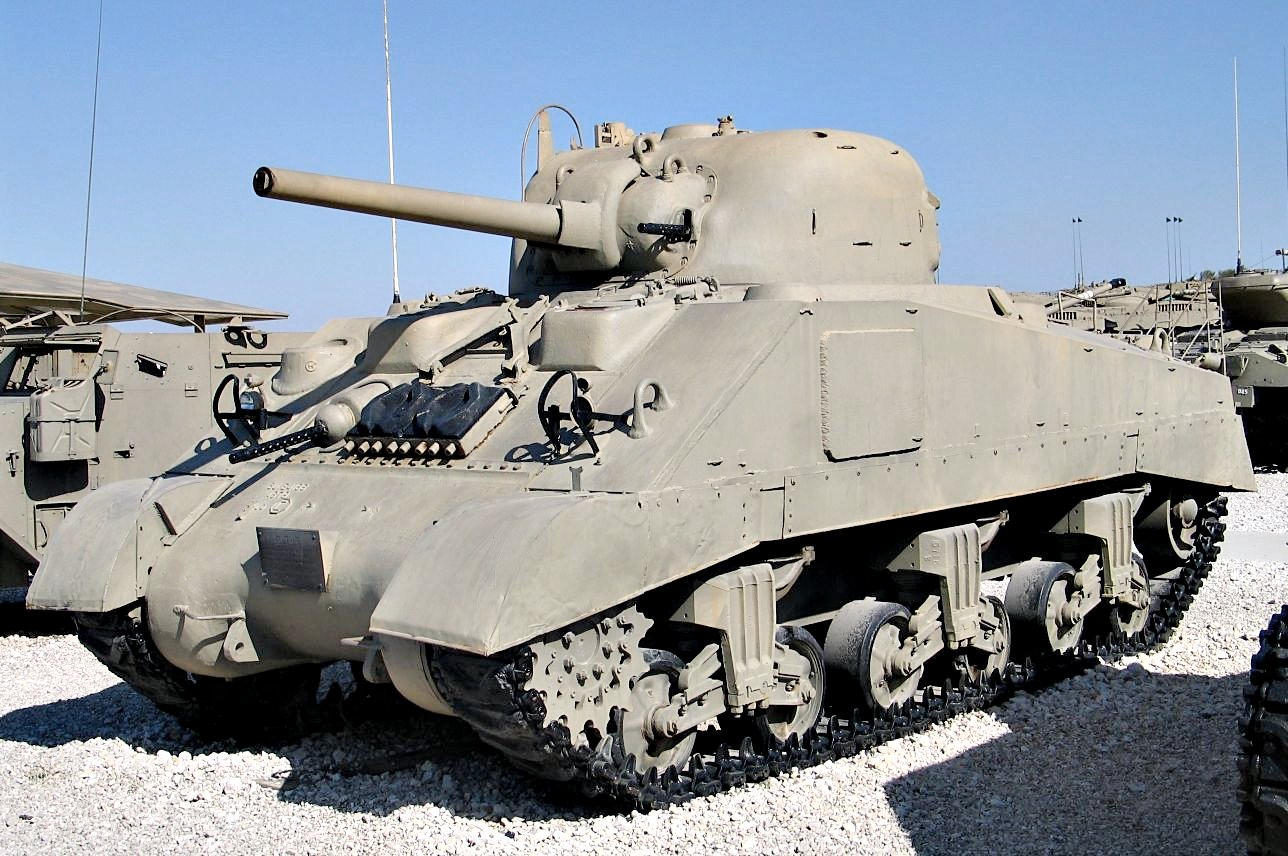
Israeli M4A4 Shermans were also used in the Sinai campaign.

Guy Mollet decided in late September 1956 to attack Egypt with Britain and, if the British backed out (as Mollet believed that they might), with Israel. On 7 August, the French asked Ben Gurion if Israel would attack Egypt with France; Israel agreed, and joint planning began. On 30 September, secret Franco-Israeli talks (based on British non-involvement) began in Paris. The French wanted to use British airfields in Cyprus to bomb Egypt, but wanted to use Israeli airfields if those in Cyprus were unavailable. On 5 October, the British were informed about the Franco-Israeli alliance.

=== Israeli planning ===
In July 1956, IDF chief of staff Moshe Dayan advised Prime Minister David Ben-Gurion that Israel should attack Egypt at the first opportunity. Ben-Gurion said that he preferred to attack Egypt with French aid.

Operation Kadesh called for the Israeli Air Force to attain air superiority, followed by "one continuous battle". Israeli forces would swiftly encircle and take the four Egyptian strong points in the Sinai: Sharm el-Sheikh, Arish, Abu Uwayulah (Abu Ageila), and the Gaza Strip.

After the capture of these objectives, Israel hoped that the Egyptian Army would retreat into Egypt. British and French forces would be able to push the army against an Israeli advance, crushing it.

== Protocol of Sèvres ==
France, Israel and the United Kingdom reached a secret agreement about political and military cooperation to overthrow Nasser and de-nationalise the Canal during discussions from 22 to 24 October 1956 in Sèvres, France. According to the protocol, Israel would attack Egypt on 29 October. The British and French governments would issue a joint appeal for Egypt and Israel to cease firing and withdraw 10 miles from the canal. If one of the forces rejected this demand (a guarantee, since Israel was already aware of it), the French and British would attack on 31 October.

== Forces ==
=== British ===
6 August Universal Newsreel about the departure of British and French ships for Egypt

The 16th Independent Parachute Brigade Group, intended as the main British strike force against Egypt, had neglected paratroop training in favour of counter-insurgency operations. The Royal Navy had formidable power with the guns of its warships and aircraft flown from its carriers, but lacked amphibious capability.

The Royal Air Force (RAF) introduced two long-range bombers, the Vickers Valiant and the English Electric Canberra, but had not established proper bombing techniques for these aircraft. General Charles Keightley, the commander of the invasion force, believed that air power alone was sufficient to defeat Egypt. Hugh Stockwell, the task force ground commander, believed that methodical, systematic armoured operations centred on the Centurion tank were the key to victory.

=== French ===
French paratroopers from the elite Regiment de Parachutistes Coloniaux (RPC) were experienced soldiers who had distinguished themselves in Indochina and in Algeria. The main French (and Israeli) tank, the AMX-13, was lightly-armoured but agile – designed for mobile flanking operations. The French Navy had a powerful carrier force but, like its British counterpart, lacked landing craft.

=== Israeli ===
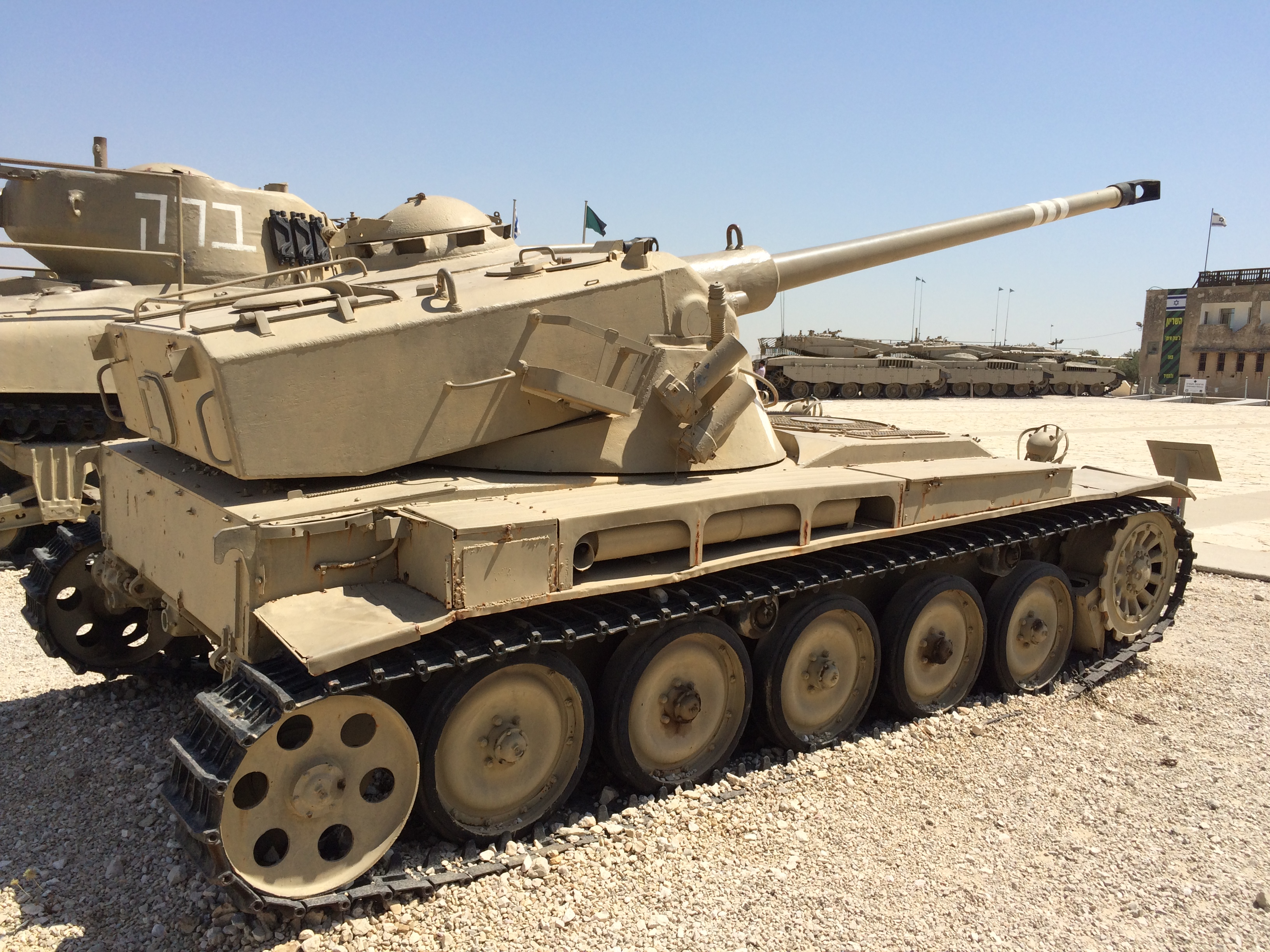
An Israeli AMX-13 tank

American military historian Derek Varble called the Israel Defense Forces (IDF) the best military force in the Middle East, with deficiencies such as "immature doctrine, faulty logistics, and technical inadequacies". IDF chief of staff Moshe Dayan encouraged aggression, initiative, and ingenuity by the Israeli officer corps but ignored logistics and armoured operations. Dayan preferred infantry at the expense of armour.

The IDF had a disorganised logistics arm, which was put under strain when the IDF invaded the Sinai. The main IDF tank was the AMX-13, and the main aircraft were the Dassault Mystère IVA and the Ouragan. Superior pilot training gave the Israeli Air Force an edge over their Egyptian opponents.

=== Egyptian ===
In the Egyptian Armed Forces, politics instead of military competence was the main criterion for promotion. Egyptian commander Abdel Hakim Amer was a heavy drinker who was close friends with Nasser and was incompetent as a general during the crisis. In 1956, the Egyptian military had weapons from the Soviet Union such as T-34 and IS-3 tanks, MiG-15 fighters, Ilyushin Il-28 bombers, SU-100 self-propelled guns and assault rifles.

Lines between officers and men in the Egyptian Army led to "mistrust and contempt" between officers and the men who served under them. Egyptian troops were excellent in defensive operations, but had little capacity for offensive operations due to a lack of "rapport and effective small-unit leadership".

== Operation Kadesh ==
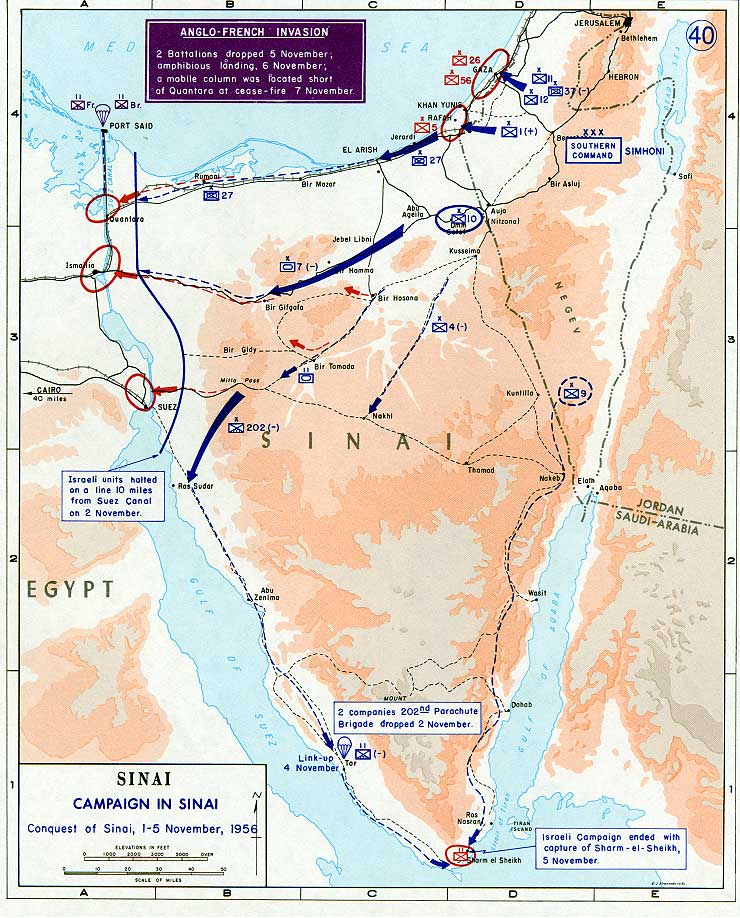
Anglo-French parachute drops on the Suez Canal and the Israeli conquest of Sinai

Operation Kadesh began on 29 October 1956. At about 3:00 pm, Israeli Air Force Mustangs attacked Egyptian positions throughout the Sinai. Egyptian commander Abdel Hakim Amer first treated reports of an Israeli incursion into the Sinai as a raid, not an invasion, and did not order a general alert. By the time Amer realised his mistake, the Israelis had made significant advances into the Sinai.

Because Israeli intelligence expected Jordan to enter the war on Egypt's side, the Israel Border Police militarised the Israel-Jordan border (including the Green Line) with the West Bank. Israeli-Arab villages along the Jordanian border were placed under curfew. This resulted in the killings of 48 civilians in the Arab village of Kafr Qasim in an event known as the Kafr Qasim massacre.

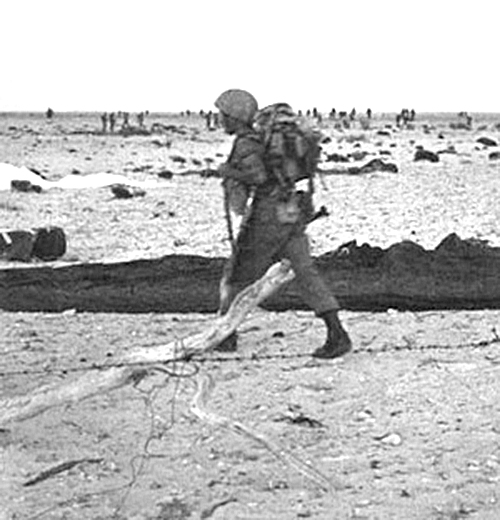
Israeli paratrooper near the Mitla Pass

The Israeli 9th Infantry Brigade captured Ras al-Naqb, an important staging ground for the attack on Sharm el-Sheikh during the night of 29–30 October. That night the 4th Infantry Brigade also stormed al-Qusaymah, a jumping-off point for the assault on the village of Abu Uwayulah.

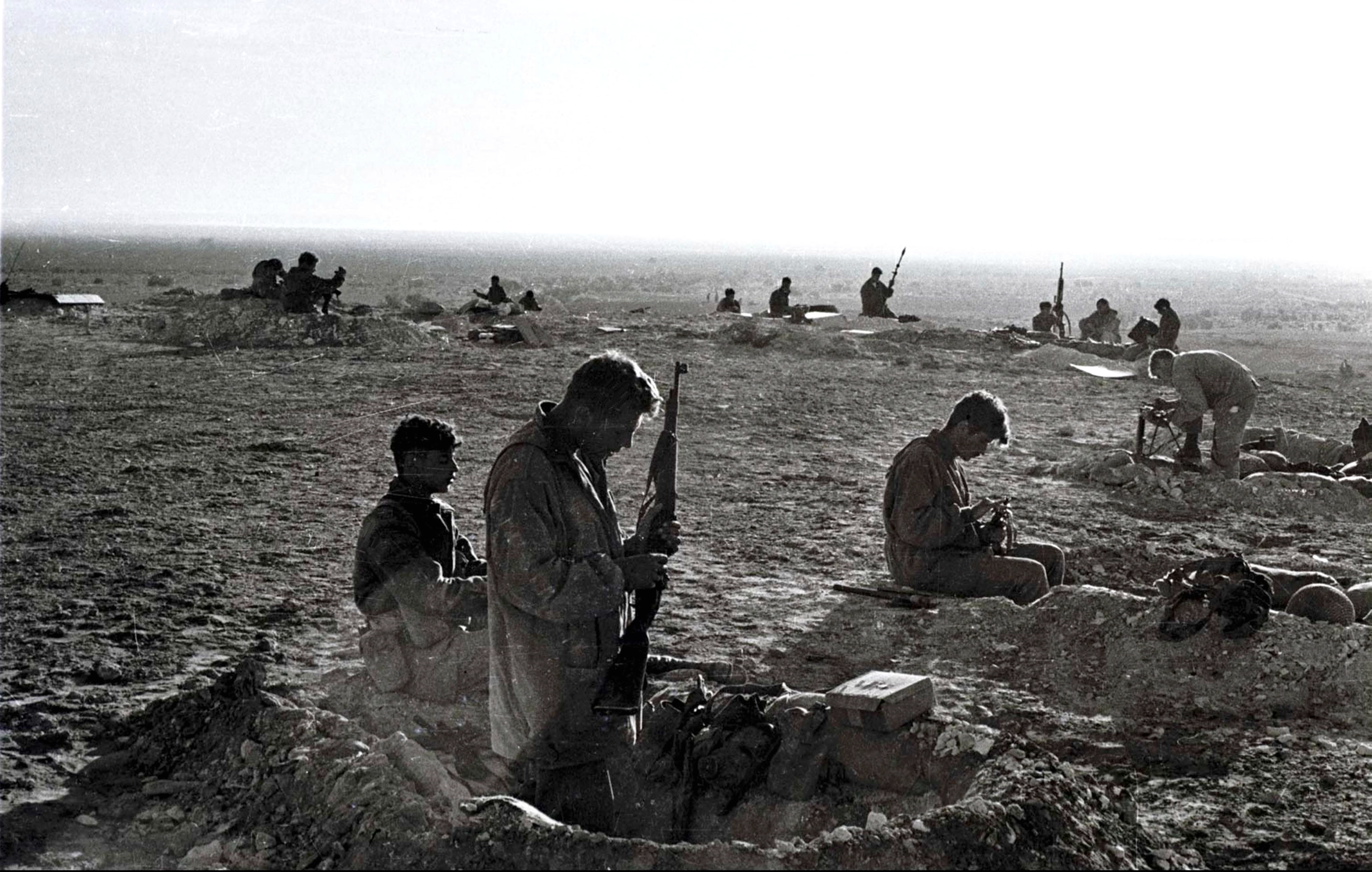
Israeli paratroopers dig in near the Parker Memorial.

A group of paratroopers under Ariel Sharon advanced to meet the 1st Brigade. Sharon assaulted Themed in a dawn attack, storming the town with his armour, and decided to attack the Egyptian positions at Jebel Heitan. The Egyptians, defeated, were forced to retreat. A total of 260 Egyptian and 38 Israeli soldiers were killed in the battle. Although it was an Israeli victory, the casualties would haunt Sharon.

Abu Uwayulah, the road hub of the Sinai, was a key Israeli target. East of Abu Uwayulah were several ridges that formed a natural defensive zone known to the Israelis as the Hedgehog. Holding the Hedgehog were 3,000 Egyptians from the 17th and 18th battalions of the 3rd Infantry Division, commanded by Colonel Sami Yassa. From 30 October to 1 November, the Israeli military repeatedly assaulted the position. Eventually, lack of ammunition and water forced the Egyptians to retreat.

=== Air ===
In air combat, Israeli aircraft shot down seven to nine Egyptian jets and lost one plane. On 1 November, Nasser ordered his pilots to disengage and fly their planes to bases in southern Egypt.

Israeli Dassault Mystère fighter jets attacked a British warship, the Black Swan-class sloop HMS Crane, two days later as it patrolled the approaches to the Gulf of Aqaba after it was mistaken for an Egyptian Navy warship. Three crewmen were wounded. The ship used heavy anti-aircraft fire, and accounts differ about whether it shot down an attacking jet.

=== Navy ===
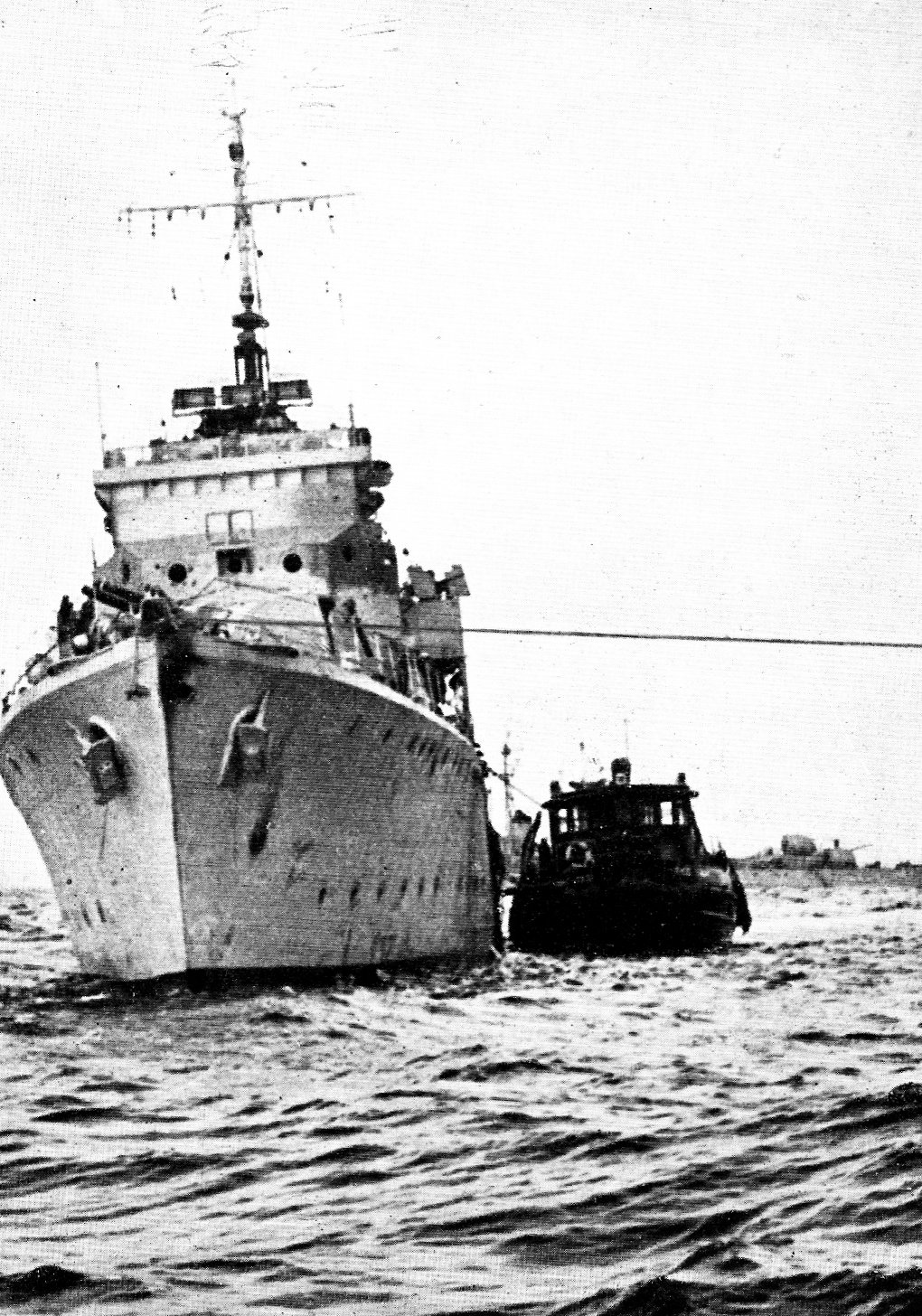
The destroyer Ibrahim el Awal (left) after its capture by the Israeli navy

The Egyptian Navy's Ibrahim el Awal, an ex-British Hunt-class destroyer, was damaged by the Israeli navy and captured on 31 October after shelling Haifa. That day, the Egyptian frigate Domiat was also destroyed by a British light cruiser. On 4 November, a squadron of Egyptian motor torpedo boats attacked a British destroyer off the northeast coast of the Nile delta. Three torpedo boats were sunk, and the rest retreated.

=== Gaza Strip ===
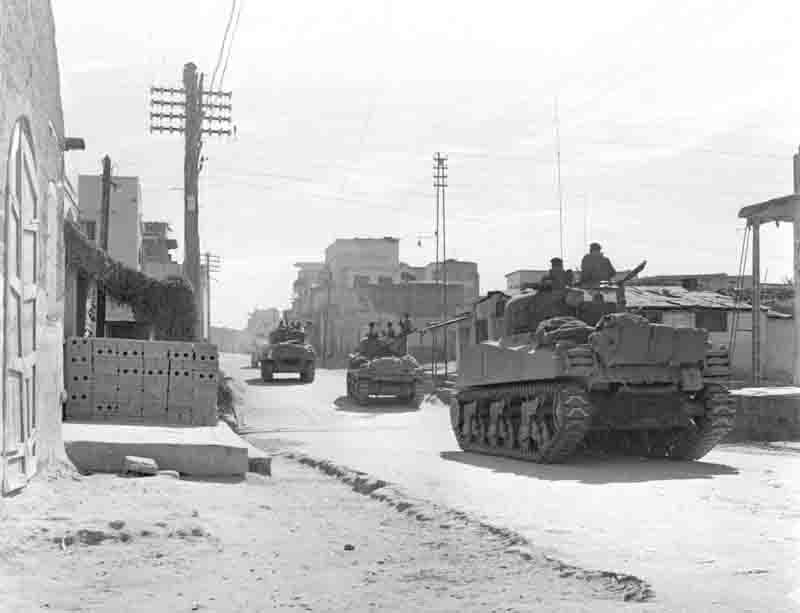
Israeli tanks in Gaza

U.S. newsreel on the Sinai and Gaza invasions

The city of Rafah was strategically important to Israel. Dayan ordered the IDF to focus on breaking through, rather than reducing every Egyptian strongpoint. French warships led by the cruiser Georges Leygues provided fire support. On the morning of 1 November, Israeli tanks encircled the city. Egyptian commander General al-Abd ordered his forces to abandon their posts outside Rafah and retreat into the city.

With Rafah more or less cut off and Israeli forces controlling the northern and eastern roads into the city, the 27th Armored Brigade went west to take al-Arish. Nasser had ordered his forces to fall back towards the Suez Canal, so at first Bar-Lev and his men met little resistance as they advanced across the northern Sinai.

Hearing about the order to withdraw, General al-Abd and his men left Rafah on the morning of 1 November through a gap in the Israeli lines. Three hours later, the Israelis took Rafah. Israeli troops then killed 111 people, including 103 refugees, in Rafah's Palestinian refugee camp. The circumstances surrounding the killings are disputed. On 2 November, Bar-Lev's forces took al-Arish.

The IDF attacked the Egyptian defences outside Gaza City late on 1 November. Infantry and armour attacked the al-Muntar fortress outside Gaza City, killing or capturing 3,500 Egyptian National Guard troops. By noon on 2 November, there was no Egyptian opposition in the Gaza City area. By noon of 3 November, The Israelis controlled nearly the entire Gaza Strip by noon the following day except for a few isolated strong points, which were soon attacked and taken.

The UN estimated that 447 to 550 Palestinian civilians were killed by Israeli troops during the first weeks of Israeli occupation of the strip. The manner in which these people were killed is disputed. A number of Palestinians were killed after the town of Khan Yunis was taken on 3 November. Israel maintains that the Palestinians were killed in street fighting, and the Palestinians said that they were unarmed civilians executed by Israeli troops. The director of the United Nations Relief and Works Agency later reported that 275 people were killed.

In Gaza City and Khan Yunis, street fighting led to the deaths of "dozens, perhaps hundreds, of non-combatants". Food and medicine distribution for refugees was complicated when some Palestinians ransacked warehouses belonging to the United Nations Relief and Works Agency. This was compounded by a widespread Israeli view that responsibility for the Palestinian refugees rested with the UNRWA (not Israel), which led the Israelis to be slow providing aid.

=== Sharm el-Sheikh ===
By 3 November, Sharm el-Sheikh was the last Israeli objective. The Egyptian forces there had the advantage of holding one of the most strongly-fortified positions in the Sinai, but had been subjected to heavy Israeli air attacks since the beginning of the war. The main difficulty faced by Colonel Abraham Yoffe's 9th Infantry Brigade was logistical; there were no good roads linking Ras an-Naqb and Sharm el-Sheikh.

After a number of skirmishes on the outskirts of Sharm el-Sheikh, Yoffe ordered an attack on the port around midnight on 4 November. Following four hours of heavy fighting, he ordered his men to retreat. On the morning of 5 November, Israeli forces launched an artillery barrage and napalm strikes against Egyptian forces defending Sharm el-Sheikh. At 9:30 am on 5 November, Egyptian commander Raouf Mahfouz Zaki surrendered Sharm el-Sheikh. The Israelis had 10 killed and 32 wounded, and the Egyptians had lost about 100 with 31 wounded. Another 864 Egyptian soldiers were taken prisoner.

=== Casualties ===
Israeli losses were 172 dead and 817 wounded; the number of Egyptians killed was "never reliably established". Egyptian casualties in the Israeli invasion were estimated at 1,000–3,000 dead and 4,000 wounded, and estimated losses in the Anglo-French operation were 650 dead and 900 wounded. An estimated 1,000 Egyptian civilians died.

== Anglo-French canal invasion ==
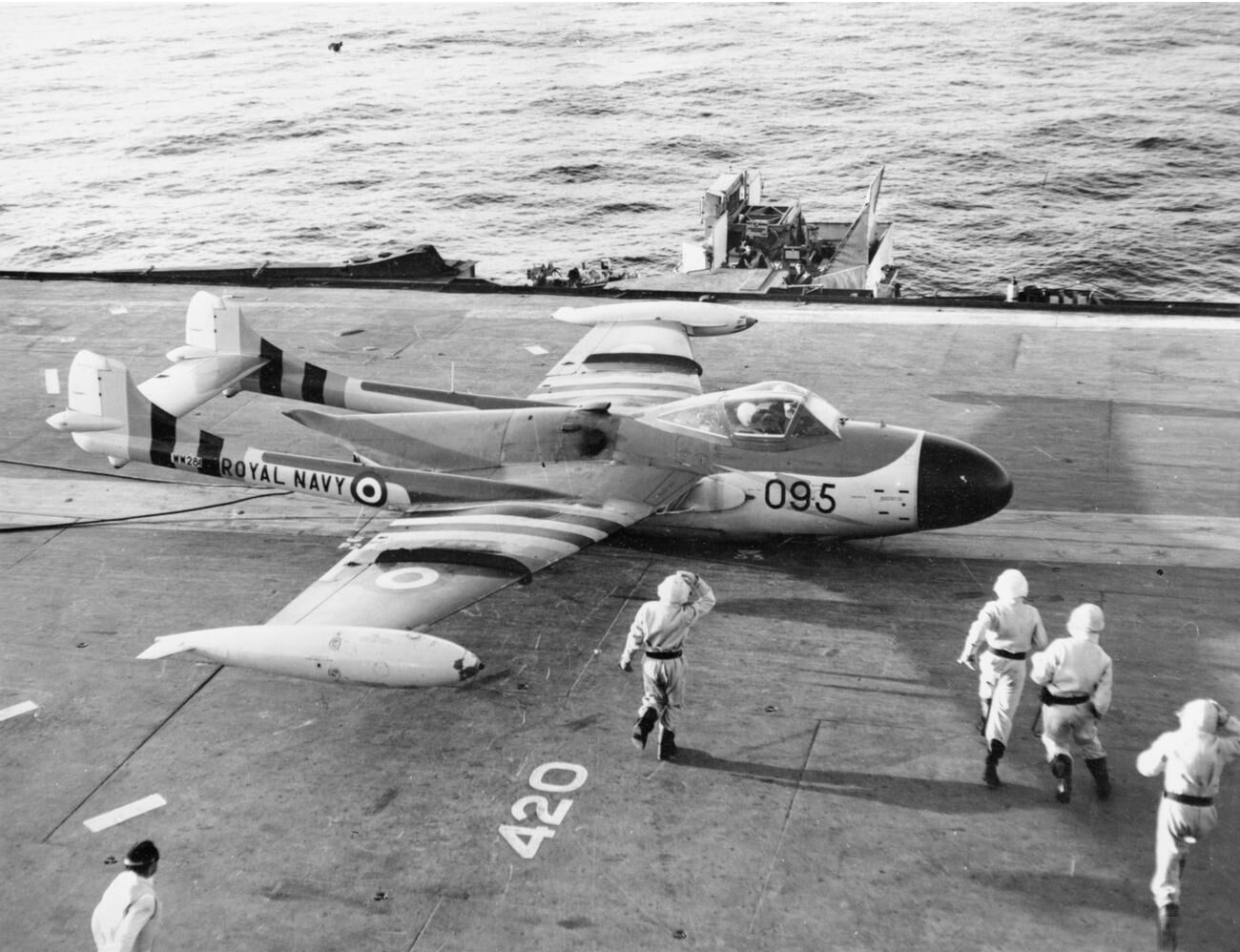
A battle-damaged de Havilland Sea Venom on HMS Eagle

The Anglo-French military action had two phases: Operation Musketeer and Operation Telescope. Operation Musketeer (also known as Operation Revise) had two phases:

- Phase I: Anglo-French air forces gain air supremacy over Egypt's skies.
- Phase II: Anglo-French air forces launch a 10-day "aero-psychological" campaign that would destroy the Egyptian economy.

To support the invasion, large air forces were deployed to Cyprus and Malta by Britain and France with many aircraft carriers were deployed. The two airbases on Cyprus were so congested that a third field, in poor condition, had to be brought into use for French aircraft. Operation Telescope consisted of air- and sea-borne landings to capture the Canal Zone.

=== Operation Revise ===
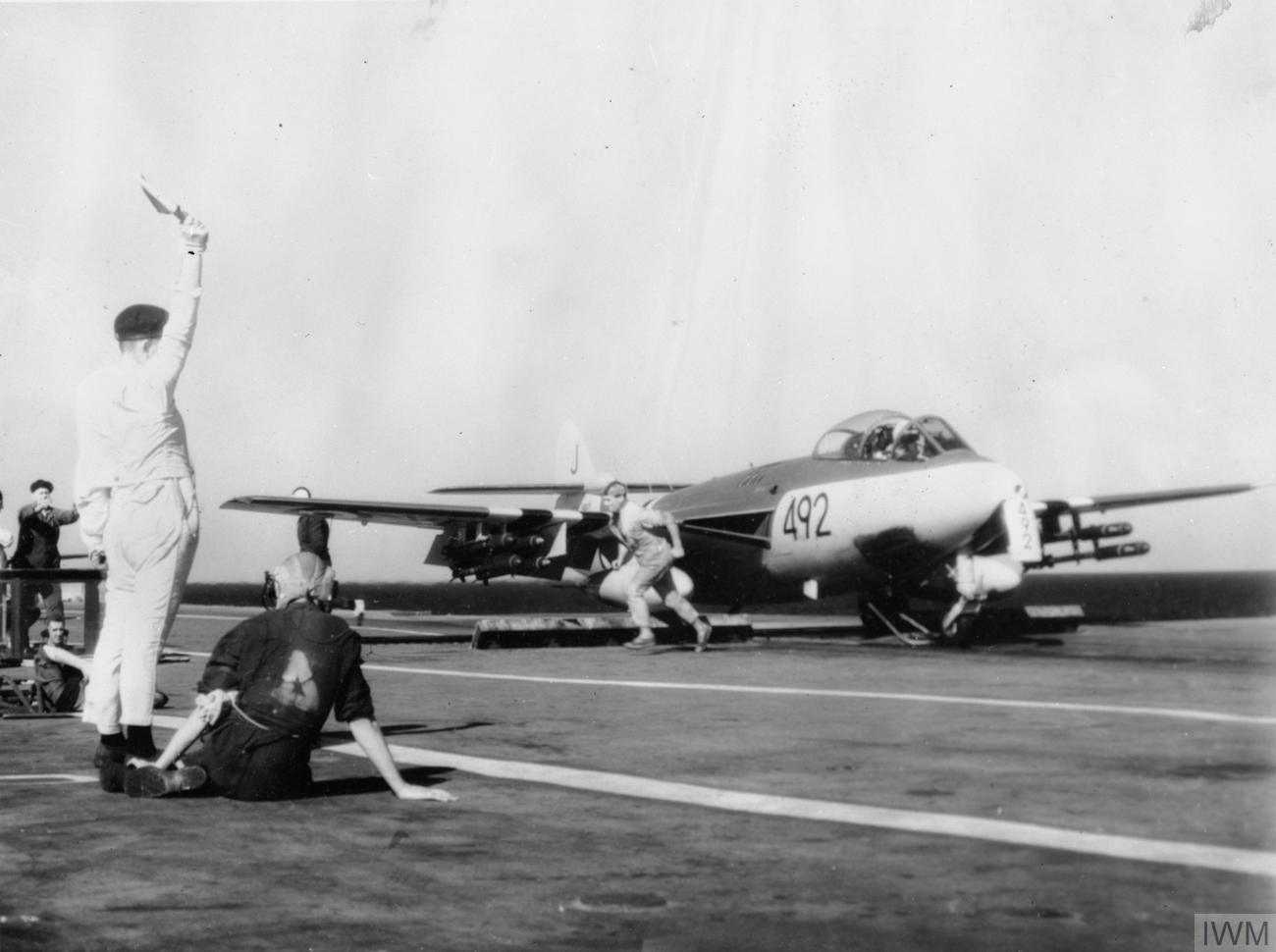
An 899 Naval Air Squadron Hawker Sea Hawk, armed with rockets, about to be launched from HMS Eagle to strike an Egyptian airfield

On the morning of 30 October, Britain and France sent ultimatums to Egypt and Israel. Eden and Mollet ordered Phase I of Operation Revise to begin with a bombing campaign 13 hours after the Anglo-French ultimatum.

Field Marshal Abdel Hakim Amer ordered Egyptian troops in the Sinai to stay put; he assured Nasser that the Egyptians could defeat the Israelis in the Sinai and then defeat the Anglo-French forces when they came ashore in the canal zone. Amer advised Nasser to send more troops into the Sinai to defeat Israel. Late on 31 October, Nasser disregarded Amer's rosy assessment and ordered his forces to disengage in the Sinai and retreat to the canal zone to face the expected Anglo-French invasion.

British night bombing was ineffective. On the morning of 1 November, carrier-based planes began a series of daytime strikes on Egypt. By that night, the Egyptian Air Force had lost 200 planes.

Keightley ordered the beginning of Revise Phase II, a wide-ranging interdiction campaign. By 3 November, Beaufre convinced Keightley and Stockwell to seize the canal zone with airborne landings (instead of waiting the planned ten days for Revise II) and received approval for Operation Telescope, as Beaufre code-named the airborne assault on the canal zone.

=== Paratroop attack on Port Said ===
In the early morning of 5 November, an advance element of the 3rd Battalion of the British Parachute Regiment led by Brigadier M.A.H. Butler dropped on the El Gamil airfield. At the same time, Lieutenant Colonel Pierre Chateau-Jobert landed with a force of the 2nd RPC at Raswa.

The British forces moved towards Port Said with air support before digging in at 13:00 to hold until the beach assault. The British paratroopers decisively defeated the Egyptians, with four dead and 32 wounded.

The French paratroopers swiftly secured the western bridge. With close air support, they stormed and took Port Said's waterworks that morning. Chateau-Jobert followed this success with an attack on Port Fuad which became a rout. During the canal-zone fighting, French paratroopers often executed Egyptian POWs.

General Salahedin Moguy, the Egyptian commander at Port Said, then proposed a truce. Moguy had no interest in surrendering, and proposed the truce to buy time for his men to dig in. Since the paratroopers alone were unable to take the city, Beaufre and British Admiral Manley Laurence Power urged the acceleration of sea-borne landings and for Allied forces to land the following day.

=== Royal Marines at Port Said ===
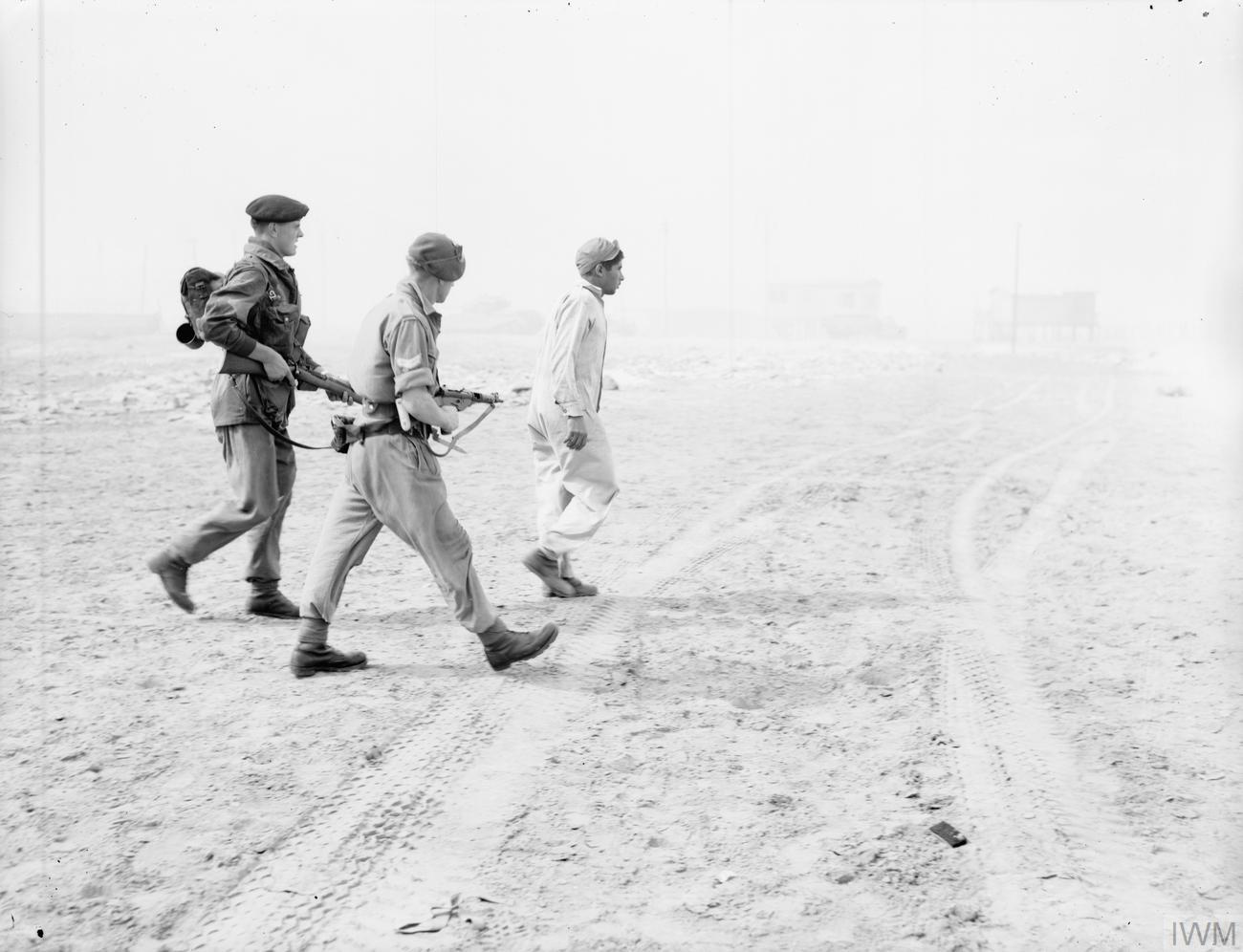
Troops of the Parachute Regiment escort a captured Egyptian soldier at Port Said.

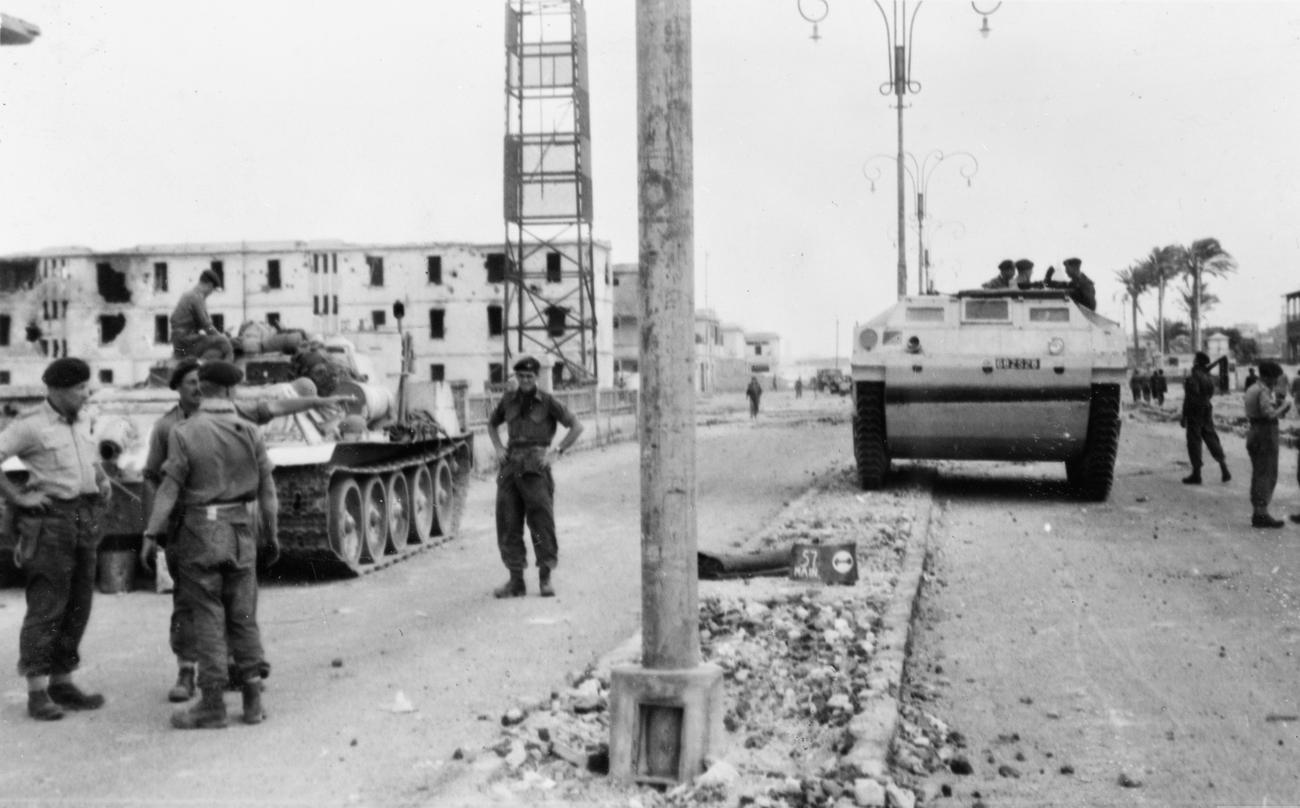
A British linkup between the 3rd Battalion, the Parachute Regiment, and the commandos at the Coast Guard barracks in Port Said. The paratroopers have a captured SU-100 tank destroyer, and the commandos a Buffalo amphibious assault vehicle.

At first light on 6 November, Royal Marines of No. 42 and 40 Commando stormed the beaches. The battle group offshore opened fire, providing covering fire for the landings. The town of Port Said sustained damage, and was seen to be ablaze.

The men of 42 Commando, as much as possible, by-passed Egyptian positions and focused on trying to break through inland. Entering downtown Port Said, the Marines engaged in urban combat. In the afternoon, 522 French paratroopers were dropped near Port Fuad; they were supported by French Aéronavale corsairs and AMX-13 light tanks.

British Royal Marines of No. 45 Commando assaulted by helicopter, meeting stiff resistance with shore batteries striking several helicopters; friendly fire from British carrier-borne aircraft also mistakenly hit 45 Commando and HQ. One Marine was killed and 15 wounded when a carrier-based Wyvern mistakenly fired into a concentration of marines. This was the first time helicopters were used by British forces to lift men into a combat zone.

Nasser called the Suez War a "people's war". Egyptian troops were ordered to wear civilian clothes, and guns were given to Egyptian civilians. From Nasser's point of view, this presented the British and French with an unsolvable dilemma: kill innocent civilians and bring world sympathy to his cause (weakening morale in Britain and France), or fall prey to snipers attacking "with near impunity by hiding among crowds of apparent non-combatants".

These tactics worked well against the British. British leaders, especially Eden and First Sea Lord Lord Mountbatten, tried to limit Egyptian civilian deaths. Despite Eden's efforts, British bombing killed hundreds of Egyptian civilians during Revise II; these deaths were due more to imprecise aiming, rather than a deliberate policy of "area bombing" such as that used against Germany in World War II.

Most Egyptian soldiers wore civilian clothing and operated in small groups, but remained organised. Civilians who took up arms as guerrillas were organised into eight groups, with five additional groups joining them from outside the city. The Egyptians were gradually pushed back as the British took key objectives. Egyptian sniper attacks and the need to clear every building led 3 Para to be slowed in their attempts to link up with the Royal Marines.

Stockwell and Beaufre spent the day in Port Said, and were cut off from the news; late in the day, they learn about the acceptance of the United Nations ceasefire. The British forces were at al-Cap, a small village four miles north of al-Qantarah at 2:00 am, when the ceasefire became effective. The Royal Marines had nine killed and 60 wounded in the Port Said landings.

== Responses ==
=== Britain ===
12 November 1956 newsreel about the end of the invasion

Eden's obsession with secrecy meant that the government did nothing in the months before the attack to explain to the British people or those called up for national service in the summer and fall of 1956 why the war was necessary. However, only one British soldier refused to fight.

Some historians said that most of the British people were on Eden's side. According to public-opinion polls, 37 percent of the British people supported the war and 44 percent were opposed. A 10–11 November opinion poll found that 53 percent supported the war and 32 percent opposed it.

Although the public believed the British government's justification of the invasion to separate Israeli and Egyptian forces, protests occurred in Britain after the war began. Stormy debates in the House of Commons on 1 November 1956 almost degenerated into fist-fights after several Labour MPs compared Eden to Hitler. The British government pressured the BBC to support the war, and considered taking over the network. Most Conservative constituency associations passed resolutions of support for "Sir Anthony", but most letters to MPs from constituents opposed the Suez attack; many were from voters who identified as Conservatives.

Nation-wide anti-war protests organised by the Labour Party and the Trade Union Congress began on 1 November. At a 4 November Trafalgar Square rally attended by 30,000 people (the largest London rally since 1945), Labour MP Aneurin Bevan accused the government of "a policy of bankruptcy and despair". Inspired by Bevan's speech, the crowd marched on 10 Downing Street chanting "Eden Must Go!" and attempted to storm the prime minister's residence. Televised clashes between police and demonstrators demoralised the Eden cabinet, which was meeting there.

The conflict exposed Labour Party division between the middle-class, internationalist intelligentsia who opposed the conflict and working-class voters who supported it. (Note: "As late as 1956 it was the middle class, not the working class, who opposed the Anglo-French invasion of Egypt".) Labour MP Richard Crossman said that "when the Labour Party leadership tried to organise demonstrations in the Provinces of the kind they'd held in Trafalgar Square, there was great reluctance among the working classes, because we were at war. It was Munich in reverse." Another Labour MP, Barbara Castle, recalled that Labour's protest against the conflict was "drowned in a wave of public jingoism". The Suez crisis played a key role in the reconciliation of the Gaitskellite and Bevanite factions of the Labour Party (both of which condemned the invasion) after the 1955 leadership election.

=== International responses ===
==== Western governments ====
9 August Eisenhower press conference about the crisis

The United States was also dealing with the nearly-simultaneous Hungarian Revolution. Vice-President Richard Nixon later said, "We couldn't on one hand, complain about the Soviets intervening in Hungary and, on the other hand, approve of the British and the French picking that particular time to intervene against Nasser". Eisenhower believed that if the United States supported the attack on Egypt, a backlash in the Arab world might win the Arabs over to the Soviet Union.

Eisenhower ordered his treasury secretary, George M. Humphrey, to prepare to sell part of the US government's sterling bond holdings. Britain's Chancellor of the Exchequer, Harold Macmillan, told Eden that Britain's foreign exchange reserves could not sustain the devaluation of the pound that would come after the U.S. actions; within weeks of such a move, the country would be unable to import sufficient food and energy supplies. There were suspicions in the cabinet, however, that Macmillan overstated the financial situation to force Eden out; what Treasury officials told Macmillan was less serious than what he told the cabinet.

When Israel refused to withdraw its troops from the Gaza Strip and Sharm el-Sheikh, Eisenhower sought UN-backed efforts to impose economic sanctions on Israel until it withdrew from Egyptian territory. The Democratic-controlled Senate would not co-operate with Eisenhower's position on Israel.

A rare example of support for the Anglo-French actions against Egypt came from West Germany. Although his cabinet was divided, chancellor Konrad Adenauer told them on 7 November that Nasser was a pro-Soviet force who needed to be cut down to size and the attack on Egypt was justified. Adenauer feared that the United States and Soviet Union would "carve up the world" to benefit their interests, and strengthened his relationship with Mollet and France.

==== Muslim world ====
The attack on Egypt offended many in the Muslim world. In Pakistan, 300,000 people took part in a rally in Lahore to show solidarity with Egypt; a violent mob in Karachi, chanting anti-British slogans, burned down the British High Commission. In Syria, the government blew up the Kirkuk–Baniyas pipeline which had allowed Iraqi oil to reach tankers in the Mediterranean to punish Iraq for supporting the invasion and cut Britain off from a main route for taking delivery of Iraqi oil. In concert with US actions, Saudi Arabia began an oil embargo against Britain and France; the US refused to fill the gap until Britain and France agreed to a rapid withdrawal. Other NATO members refused to sell oil from Arab nations to Britain or France.

=== UN General Assembly Resolution 997 ===
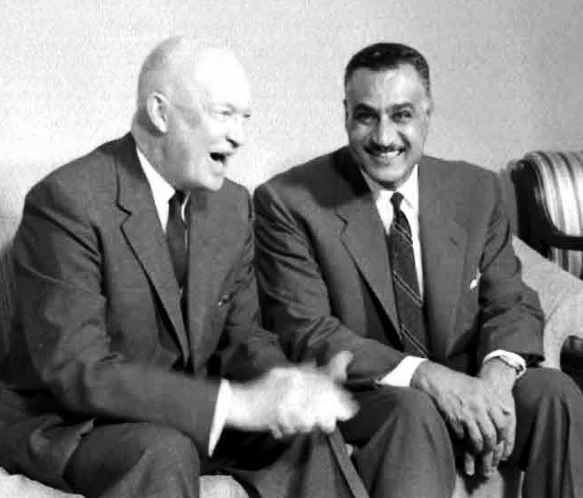
Presidents Eisenhower and Nasser meeting in New York, 1960

4 December Universal Newsreel about Dag Hammarskjöld's meeting with Nasser

On 30 October, the Security Council submitted a draft resolution calling on Israel to immediately withdraw its armed forces behind the established armistice lines; it was not adopted because of British and French vetoes. A similar draft resolution, sponsored by the Soviet Union, was also rejected. On 31 October, as planned, France and the UK launched attacks against targets in Egypt. The Security Council passed Resolution 119 later that day, calling an emergency special session of the General Assembly for the first time to make recommendations to end the fighting. The emergency special session was convened on 1 November. That day, Nasser requested diplomatic assistance from the US without requesting the same from the Soviet Union.

In the early hours of 2 November, the General Assembly adopted the United States proposal for Resolution 997. It called for an immediate ceasefire, the withdrawal of all forces behind the armistice lines, an arms embargo, and reopening of the blocked Suez Canal. The vote was 64 in favour and five opposed (Australia, New Zealand, Britain, France, and Israel), with six abstentions. The emergency special session established the first United Nations Emergency Force (UNEF).

=== Later Israeli initiatives ===
David Ben-Gurion addressed the Knesset on 7 November and declared victory, saying that the 1949 armistice agreement with Egypt was dead; the armistice lines were no longer valid, and could not be restored. Under no circumstances would Israel agree to the stationing of UN forces on its territory or in any area it occupied. Ben-Gurion obliquely referred to his intention to annex the Sinai Peninsula. According to Isaac Alteras, Ben-Gurion "was carried away by the resounding victory against Egypt" and, while "a statesman well known for his sober realism, [he] took flight in dreams of grandeur".

Ben-Gurion's speech began a four-month diplomatic struggle culminating in withdrawal from all territory under conditions less palatable than those envisioned in the speech, but with conditions for sea access to Eilat and a UNEF presence on Egyptian soil. It sparked increased international pressure on Israel to withdraw. That day in New York, the emergency session passed Resolution 1002 calling for the immediate withdrawal of Israeli troops behind the armistice lines and the immediate withdrawal of British and French troops from Egyptian territory. After a long Israeli cabinet meeting late on 8 November, Ben-Gurion told Eisenhower that Israel was willing to withdraw its forces from Sinai "when satisfactory arrangements are made with the international force that is about to enter the canal zone".

=== Soviet response ===
Premier Nikolai Bulganin threatened to intervene on the Egyptian side and launch rocket attacks on Britain, France and Israel. It was later learned that the Soviets did not have the ICBMs necessary to launch this attack, but the West did not know this at the time.

The Soviet threat to send troops to Egypt against the Allies led Eisenhower to fear that this might be the beginning of World War III, and he ordered Lockheed U-2 flights over Syria and Israel to search for Soviet air forces on Syrian bases. The Americans excluded Israel from the guarantee against Soviet attack, alarming the Israeli government. The U-2 showed that Soviet aircraft were not in Syria, despite the threats.

== Ceasefire ==
Israelis protesting the UN order to evacuate Gaza and Sinai, 14 February 1957

Anthony Eden announced a ceasefire on 6 November, warning neither France nor Israel beforehand. Troops were still in Port Said on operational manoeuvres. Port Said had been overrun, and the military assessment was that the Suez Canal could have been taken within 24 hours.

Eisenhower opposed an immediate withdrawal of British, French and Israeli troops until US ambassador to the United Nations Henry Cabot Lodge Jr. advocated it. Without further guarantees, the Anglo-French task force had to finish withdrawing by 22 December 1956 before its replacement by Danish and Colombian units of the UNEF.

The Israelis refused to host a UN force on Israeli-controlled territory, and withdrew from the Sinai and Gaza in March 1957. Before the withdrawal, Israeli forces destroyed infrastructure in the Sinai Peninsula such as roads, railways, telephone lines, and all houses in the villages of Abu Ageila and El Quseima. Israeli troops confiscated Egyptian National Railways equipment for use by Israel Railways.

The UNEF was formed by forces from countries which were not part of NATO or the Warsaw Pact. Canadian Armed Forces troops participated in later years, since Canada spearheaded the idea of a neutral force. By 24 April 1957, the canal was reopened to shipping.

== Aftermath ==
1957 newsreels about the aftermath of the crisis

The conflict was a military victory for the coalition and a political victory for Egypt, which maintained control of the canal.

=== Israel ===
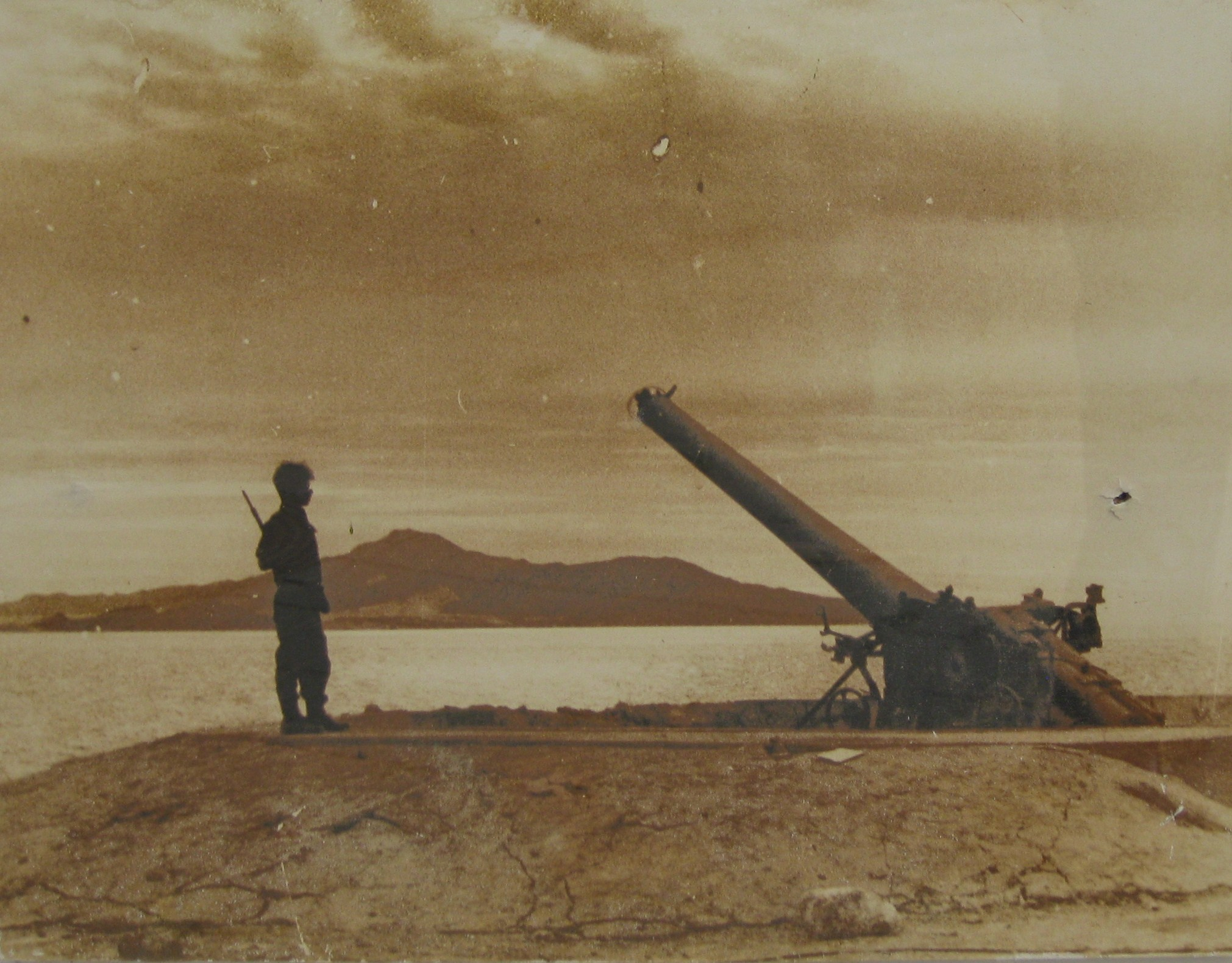
An Israeli soldier stands next to an Egyptian gun that blocked the Tiran Straits.

Because of the arming of Egypt via Czechoslovakia, Israel expected an Egyptian invasion in March or April 1957 and a Soviet invasion of Syria; neither occurred after this war. The fight over the canal laid the groundwork for the Six-Day War in 1967 due to the lack of a peace settlement after the 1956 war and rising tensions between Egypt and Israel. The Israel Defense Forces gained confidence from the campaign.

The Straits of Tiran, closed by Egypt since 1950, were re-opened to Israeli shipping. The Israelis also secured UN peacekeepers in Sinai. Operation Kadesh bought Israel an eleven-year lull in its southern-border conflict with Egypt.

Israel's refusal to withdraw without guarantees, defying the United States and the United Nations, ended Western efforts (primarily American and British) to impose a political settlement in the Middle East without considering Israel's security needs. In October 1965, Eisenhower told Jewish fundraiser and Republican Party supporter Max M. Fisher that he regretted forcing Israel to withdraw from the Sinai Peninsula.

=== Soviet Union ===
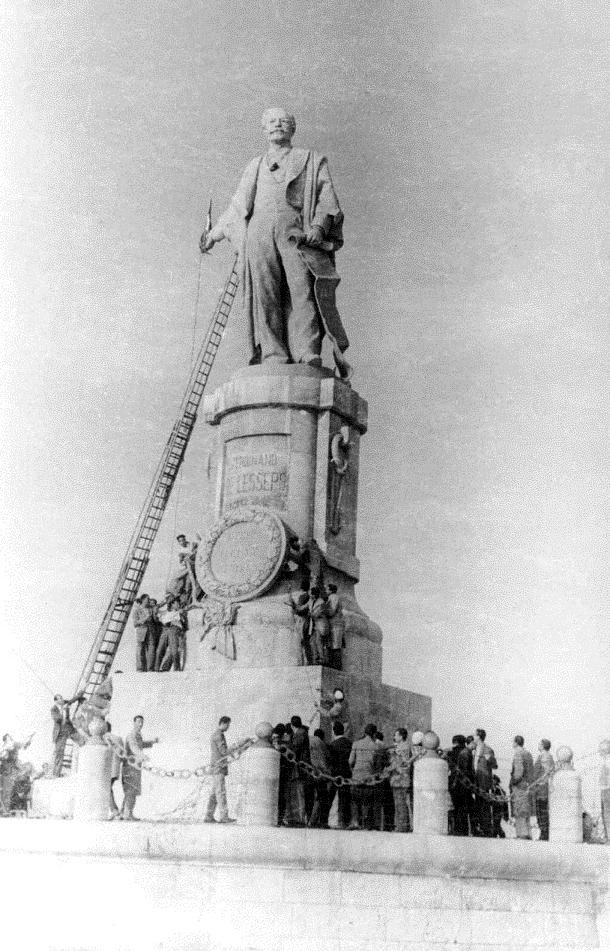
Statue of Ferdinand de Lesseps, who developed the Suez Canal, being removed after the canal's 1956 nationalisation

The Soviet Union increased its influence in the Middle East. Nikita Khrushchev's publicised threat, in letters written by Nikolai Bulganin, to begin rocket attacks on 5 November on Britain, France, and Israel if they did not withdraw from Egypt was believed at the time to have forced a ceasefire. Soviet prestige was enhanced in Egypt, the Arab world and the Third World, who believed that the USSR was prepared to launch a nuclear attack on Britain, France and Israel for Egypt. Although Nasser privately admitted that American economic pressure saved him, he publicly called Khrushchev (not Eisenhower) Egypt's saviour and special friend.

Khrushchev saw the Suez crisis as a triumph for Soviet nuclear brinkmanship, saying that his threat to use nuclear weapons saved Egypt. A long period of subsequent crises began with the November 1958 Berlin crisis and culminated in the 1962 Cuban Missile Crisis. The Soviet Union avoided most repercussions from its violent suppression of the Hungarian Revolution, presenting an image at the United Nations as a defender of small powers against imperialism.

=== United States ===
The crisis may have hastened decolonisation, since many remaining British and French colonies gained independence over the next few years. The imposed ending of the crisis may have led to over-hasty decolonisation in Africa, increasing the chance of civil wars and military dictatorships in newly-independent countries.

US secretary of state John Foster Dulles saw a power vacuum in the Middle East, and thought that the United States should fill it. To prevent further Soviet expansion in the region, Eisenhower asked Congress on 5 January 1957 for authorisation to use military force if requested by any Middle Eastern nation to check aggression and to set aside $200 million to help Middle Eastern countries desiring aid from the United States. Congress granted both requests, and this policy became known as the Eisenhower Doctrine.

Nasser saw the doctrine as a heavy-handed American attempt to dominate the Middle East, leading him to ally Egypt with the Soviet Union as a counter-weight. When the Eisenhower Doctrine was abandoned in mid-1958, Nasser began pulling away from the Soviet Union to resume his preferred role as an opportunist who tried to use both superpowers to his advantage. According to American historian Arthur L. Herman, the crisis ruined the usefulness of the United Nations in supporting American geopolitical aims.

=== Europe ===
The Bulganin letters demonstrated European dependence on the United States for security against Soviet nuclear threats, although the American nuclear umbrella may not have been as reliable as advertised. The French became determined to acquire their own nuclear weapons rather than rely upon the Americans, and Germany was interested in the idea of a European "third force" in the Cold War. This helped lead to the formation of the European Economic Community, intended to be the foundation of a European third force.

=== Egypt ===
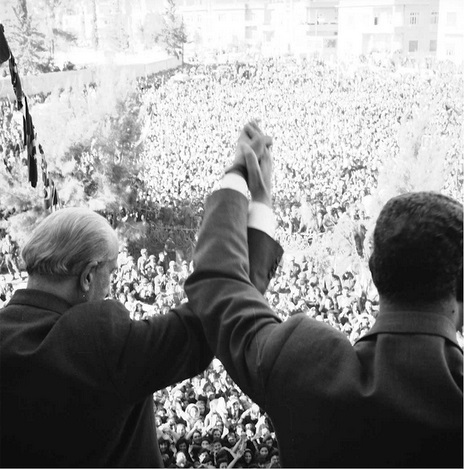
Presidents Shukri al-Quwatli (left) and Gamal Abdel Nasser clasp hands in front of crowds in Damascus days after the 1958 union of Syria and Egypt as the United Arab Republic

Egypt retained control of the Suez Canal. British historian D. R. Thorpe wrote that the outcome gave Nasser "an inflated view of his own power", thinking that he had overcome the combined forces of the United Kingdom, France and Israel and failing to attribute their withdrawal to pressure from the superpowers.

American historian Derek Varble said, "Although Egyptian forces fought with mediocre skill during the conflict, many Arabs saw Nasser as the conqueror of European colonialism and Zionism, simply because Britain, France and Israel left the Sinai and the northern Canal Zone." The fighting at Port Said became a symbol of Egyptian victory, linked to a global anti-colonial struggle.

==== Crackdown on Jews ====
In October 1956, Nasser introduced a set of sweeping regulations which abolished civil liberties, allowing Egypt to conduct mass arrests without charge and strip citizenship from any group it desired; these measures were primarily directed against Jews. As part of the new policy, 1,000 Jews were arrested and 500 Jewish businesses were seized by the government.

A statement calling the Jews "Zionists and enemies of the state" was read in the mosques of Cairo and Alexandria. Jewish bank accounts were confiscated, and many Jews lost their jobs. Lawyers, engineers, doctors and teachers were not allowed to work in their professions, and thousands of Jews were ordered to leave the country. They were allowed to take only one suitcase and a small amount of cash, and were forced to sign declarations "donating" their property to the Egyptian government. About 25,000 Jews (almost half the Jewish community) left Egypt, mainly for Israel, Europe, the United States and South America. By 1957, Egypt's Jewish population had fallen to 15,000.

=== Britain ===
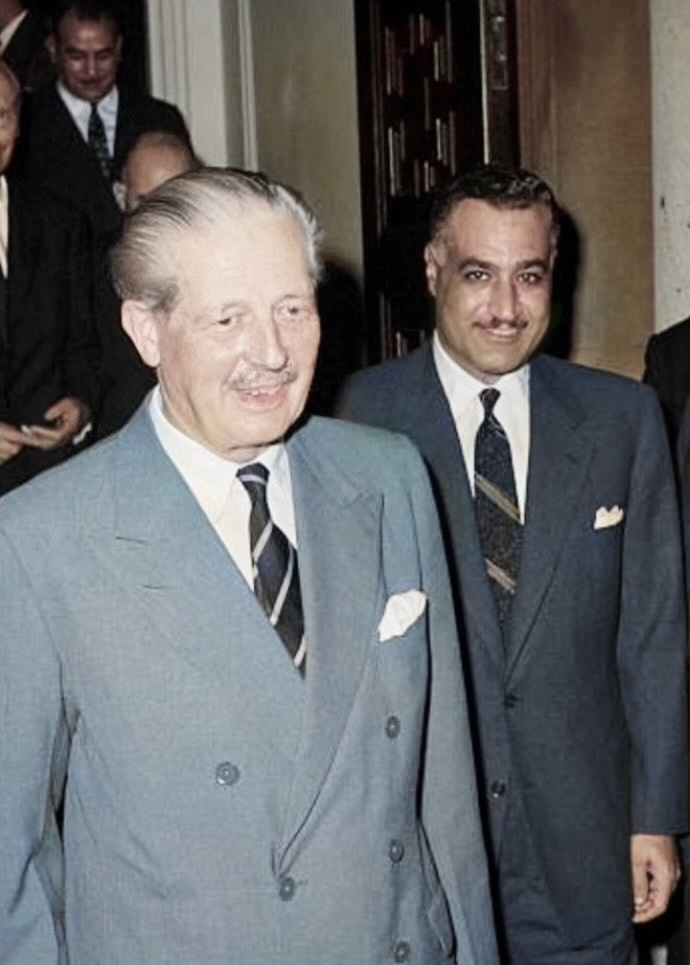
Nasser and Harold Macmillan in 1960

The political and psychological impact of the crisis impacted British politics. Anthony Eden was accused of misleading Parliament, and resigned from office on 9 January 1957. Although British influence continued in the Middle East, Suez was a blow to British prestige from which the country never recovered.

Eden's successor, Harold Macmillan, accelerated the process of decolonisation and sought to restore Britain's relationship with the United States. Benefiting from Macmillan's popularity and a healthy economy, his government increased its parliamentary majority in the 1959 general election.

During the 1960s, it was speculated that Prime Minister Harold Wilson's refusal to send British troops to the Vietnam War was partially due to lack of American support during the Suez Crisis. In 1973, Prime Minister Edward Heath refused to allow the US to resupply at UK air bases during the Yom Kippur War or to allow the Americans to gather intelligence from British bases in Cyprus.

The overall British relationship with the United States did not suffer as a result of the crisis. The Sputnik crisis and Britain's first hydrogen bomb test (Operation Grapple), both of which took place the following year, led to the 1958 US–UK Mutual Defence Agreement. Six years after the crisis, the Americans sold Britain state-of-the-art missile technology at moderate cost which became the UK Polaris programme. The war led to the eviction of GCHQ from several of its best foreign signals intelligence collection sites.

=== France ===
According to Thomas Risse-Kappen, Franco-American ties never recovered from the Suez crisis. The Franco-American relationship had been strained by what Paris considered US betrayal of the French war effort in Indochina in 1954. From General Charles de Gaulle's point of view, the Suez events demonstrated that France could not rely on its allies; the British initiated a ceasefire without consulting the French, and the Americans opposed Paris politically. Damage to ties between Paris and Washington "culminated in President de Gaulle's 1966 decision to withdraw from the military integration of NATO".

The crisis galvanised France to accelerate its nuclear-weapons program in the hope of again becoming a global power. French president René Coty decided to create the C.S.E.M., a nuclear testing facility in the French Sahara, the following year. Gerboise Bleue was conducted in 1960.

Much of the French Army officer corps felt betrayed by politicians in Paris on the verge of victory, as they believed they had been betrayed in Vietnam in 1954. The Suez crisis helped set the stage for military disillusionment with the Fourth Republic which led to the 1958 collapse of the republic.

=== Canada ===
Future Canadian prime minister Lester B. Pearson, who received the Nobel Peace Prize in 1957 for his efforts in creating a mandate for a United Nations peacekeeping force, is considered the father of the modern peacekeeping concept. The Suez crisis contributed to the adoption of a new national flag of Canada in 1965, since the Egyptian government objected to Canadian peacekeeping troops under a flag with a British ensign.

=== Military lesson ===
The military lesson reinforced by the Suez War was that the desert favoured fluid, mobile operations and aerial interdiction. To operate in open desert without air supremacy was suicidal for Egyptian forces in the Sinai, and the Royal Marine helicopter assault at Port Said "showed promise as a technique for transporting troops into small landing zones".

== See also ==
- 1956 riots in Iraq
- Closure of the Suez Canal (1967–1975)
- Egyptian National Military Museum
- Operation Tarnegol
- France–United Kingdom relations
- France–United States relations
- Israel–United States relations
- Israeli casualties of war
- List of modern conflicts in the Middle East
- United Kingdom–United States relations
