= Pierre Barjot =

French admiral

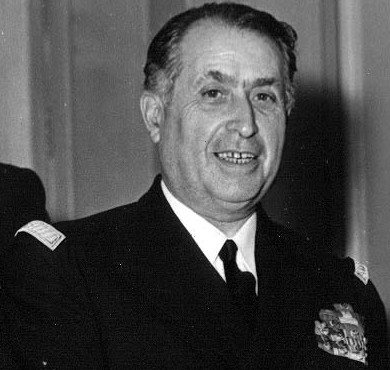
- Pierre Barjot, 1954
- Born: Pierre Emile Marie Johannes Barjot; 13 October 1899; Le Blanc, Indre, French Third Republic
- Died: 1 February 1960 (aged 60); Neuilly-sur-Seine, Paris, French Fifth Republic
- Military career
- Allegiance: France; Free French Forces
- Branch: French Navy; Free French Naval Forces
- Service years: 1918–1960
- Rank: Admiral
- Conflicts: World War II; Suez Crisis
- Awards: Grand Officer of the Legion of Honour; Médaille de la Résistance; Croix de guerre 1939–1945 (France); Commander of the Order for Maritime Merit

Pierre Emile Marie Johannes Barjot (French pronunciation: [pjɛʁ emil maʁi jɔanes baʁʒo]; 13 October 1899 – 1 February 1960) was a French admiral. He was the commander-in-chief of the French forces during the Suez Crisis.

== Biography ==
=== Early life ===
Barjot joined the Navy in 1918, and was commissioned as a ship-of-the-line Second Ensign on 1 October 1919, while serving in the harbor of Toulon. From January 1, 1921, he served aboard the ship Aldebaran of the Pacific Squadron, and was promoted to Ensign on 1 October. In 1924, he entered the School of Underwater Navigation in Toulon. During 1925, he was posted in the submarine station of the Cherbourg Naval Base. He was promoted to Lieutenant on 16 April 1926, while serving aboard the ship Baccarat in the Mediterranean. In 1929, he became deputy commander of the submarine Dauphin, and during the same year given the command of the submarine Naïade. In 1933, Barjot entered the École de Guerre navale. After graduation, he was posted as the commander of the submarine Bévéziers on 20 December 1935. On 7 September 1936, he was promoted to lieutenant commander. During 1937, he commanded the submarine Agosta.

=== World War II ===
In 1940, at the early stages of World War II, he served in the Anglo-Saxon Department of the French Admiralty. On 17 November 1940, after the Second Armistice at Compiègne, he was given the rank of commander and posted to Marseille, where he oversaw the local merchant fleet. There, he joined a covert network of the French Resistance. In August 1941, he was assigned as deputy commandant of the Richelieu. In 1942, he was arrested by the Vichy security services and retired from the Navy, moving to Algeria. There, he assisted the Allied forces in the preparation of Operation Torch; he was one of those present in the Cherchell conference. Barjot joined the Free French Naval Forces. On 15 November 1943, he was promoted to Ship-of-the-line captain. After Operation Overlord, he was appointed deputy chief-of-staff for national defense in August 1944. He became a Counter admiral on 15 May 1945.<

=== Post-war years ===
In December 1946, he was posted as the commander of the marine forces in Morocco up to October 1948. Then, he was transferred to command the French Navy's aircraft carrier group. He was promoted to vice admiral on 21 January 1951. From January 1951 to April 1952, he commanded the maritime forces in Tunisia. After leaving that office, he commanded the strategic zone in the Indian Ocean. In 1954, he headed a squadron in Toulon. In 1955, he served as a member of the Supreme Maritime Council. During the Suez Crisis, he commanded the French forces. Afterwards, he was the marine prefect of Toulon, an office he held until October 1958, when he was transferred to the post of Naval Adjutant to the Supreme Allied Commander in Europe, General Lauris Norstad. He was promoted to full admiral on 23 December 1958, and died little more than a year afterwards.
