= Convention of Constantinople =

1888 treaty regulating the Suez Canal

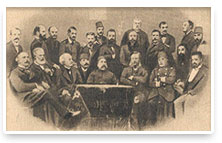
- Representatives of each respective country
- Type: Multilateral trade treaty
- Drafted: 2 March 1888
- Signed: 29 October 1888
- Location: Constantinople, Ottoman Empire
- Effective: 8 April 1904
- Expiration: N/A
- Signatories: United Kingdom; Russian Empire; French Republic; German Empire; Ottoman Empire; Austria-Hungary; Kingdom of the Netherlands; (Restoration (Spain)) Kingdom of Spain
- Depositary: Ottoman Empire
- Language: French

The Convention of Constantinople is a treaty concerning the use of the Suez Canal in the Ottoman-ruled Khedivate of Egypt. It was signed on 29 October 1888 by the United Kingdom, the German Empire, Austria-Hungary, Spain, France, Italy, the Netherlands, the Russian Empire and the Ottoman Empire. The Khedivate of Egypt, through whose territory the Canal ran and to which all shares in the Suez Canal Company were due to revert when the company's 99-year lease to manage the canal expired, was not invited to participate in the negotiations and did not sign the treaty.

The signatories comprised all the great European powers of the era, and the treaty was interpreted as a guaranteed right of passage of all ships through the Suez Canal during war and peace. During the 74 years of the United Kingdom's military presence in Egypt, from 1882 to 1956, the British government was in effective control of the Canal. In 1956, the Egyptian government nationalised the Suez Canal Company. Future wars between Egypt and Israel would see the canal blocked and unusable for extended periods of time.

== History ==
In 1875, a financial crisis prompted the Khedive of Egypt, Isma'il the Magnificent, to sell Egypt's shares in the Suez Canal Company to the United Kingdom. In 1879, the United Kingdom and other Great Powers forced the removal and exile of Isma'il and his replacement as Khedive by his son, Tewfik Pasha. Discontent with Tewfik's rule sparked the Orabi Revolt of 1881 by nationalist army officers. Interpreting the revolt as a possible threat to their use of the Suez Canal, the British intervened militarily in favour of the beleaguered Khedive. The British victory in the ensuing Anglo–Egyptian War resulted in Britain acquiring physical control over Egypt, including the Suez Canal. France, which had previously dominated the canal and whose investors still controlled the majority of shares in the Suez Canal Company, hoped to weaken British control and attempted to sway European opinion for internationalising the canal.

The British and French governments compromised by seeking to neutralise the canal via treaty. Article I, guaranteeing passage to all ships during war and peace, was in tension with Article X, which allowed the Egyptian government to take measures for "the defence of Egypt and the maintenance of public order". The latter clause was used by the British to defend their closing of the canal to Axis shipping during the Second World War and by Egypt to justify prohibiting Israeli shipping in the canal after the onset of the formal state of war between the two states in 1948.

The British government accepted the treaty reluctantly and only with serious reservations:

The delegates of Great Britain, in offering this text as the definitive rule to secure the free use of the Suez Canal, believe it is their duty to announce a general reservation as to the applicability of its provisions in so far as they are incompatible with the transitory and exceptional state in which Egypt is actually found and so far as they might fetter the liberty of action of the government during the occupation of Egypt by the British forces.

France accepted the reservation but, in accordance with international law at the time, noted that made the treaty a "technically inoperative" "academic declaration." The reservation was not removed until the Entente Cordiale between the United Kingdom and France, with the Convention finally coming into force in 1904. The Entente Cordiale stipulated that the functioning of the international supervisory commission described in Article 8 would "remain in abeyance." However, for the next 40 years, British actions would largely be in the spirit of the abandoned reservation.

On 5 August 1914, at the beginning of the First World War, Egypt, under the nationalist Khedive Abbas Hilmi II, declared that the Canal would be open to ships of all nations. However, the United Kingdom subsequently deposed Abbas; replaced him with his uncle, Hussein Kamel; and declared the re-establishment of the Sultanate of Egypt as a British protectorate. Thereafter, Britain barred canal access to ships of the Central Powers for the duration of the war. Citing the security of the canal, Britain attempted to maintain its prerogatives in unilateral declarations.

On 5 June 1967, during the Six-Day War, Egypt closed and blockaded the canal against Israel. The canal remained blocked and closed through the War of Attrition of 1968 to 1970 and the October War of 1973. The waterway was eventually reopened on 10 June 1975. The 14-state Multinational Force and Observers (MFO) currently oversees the terms of the peace treaty over the canal, which is owned and maintained by the Suez Canal Authority of the Arab Republic of Egypt. According to the international rules that govern navigation through the Suez Canal, Egypt cannot forbid any vessel from passing through the Canal if there is no war between Egypt and that country.

== Sources ==
- Allain, Jean (2004). International Law in the Middle East: Closer to Power Than Justice. London: Ashgate Publishing. ISBN 978-0-7546-2436-3.
- Thomas Barclay (1907). Problems of International Practice and Diplomacy: With Special Reference to the Hague Conferences and Conventions and other General International Agreements. Boston: Boston Book Co. (online)
- Love, Kennett (1969). Suez: The Twice-Fought War. New York: McGraw Hill.
