= Israeli settlement timeline =

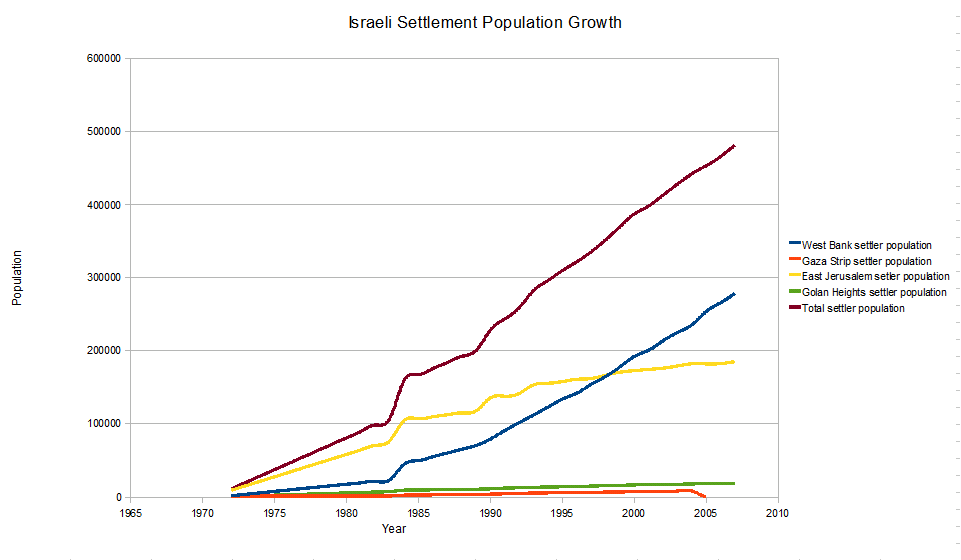
Settler population by year in the West Bank, Gaza Strip, East Jerusalem and Golan Heights 1972-2007

This is a timeline of the development of and controversy over Israeli settlements. As of January 30, 2022 the West Bank settlement population was 490,493 and the settler population in the Golan Heights was almost 27,000 and in East Jerusalem the settler population was around 220,000.

== 1967 ==
- The cease-fire agreement following the 1967 Six-Day War leaves Israel in control of a number of areas captured during hostilities.
- From Jordan, Israel gains control of the West Bank, including East Jerusalem.
- From Egypt, Israel gains control of the Sinai Peninsula up to the Suez Canal, and the Gaza Strip.
- From Syria, Israel gains control of most of the Golan Heights, which since 1981 has been administered under the Golan Heights Law.
- The municipal borders of Jerusalem are extended to include all of the Old City as well as other areas. Residents within the new municipal borders are offered the choice between citizenship (subject to a few restrictions) and permanent residency (if they wished to retain their Jordanian passports).
- The Sinai, Gaza Strip, and West Bank are put under Israeli military occupation. Residents are not offered citizenship or residency, though they typically have de facto work permits within Israel and freedom of travel there.

== 1972 ==
- Settler population. West Bank: 1,182. Gaza Strip: 700. East Jerusalem: 8,649. Golan Heights: 77. Total: 10,608.
- The West Bank settlement of Kiryat Arba is founded.

== 1975 ==
- The West Bank settlement of Ma'ale Adummim is founded.

== 1977 ==
- The West Bank settlements of Elkana, Beit El and Karnei Shomron are founded.

== 1978 ==
- Israel forcibly evacuates its citizens from the Sinai and demolishes their homes as the area is returned to Egypt pursuant to the Camp David Accords. The last Israeli community in the area, Yamit, is evacuated by early 1982.

=== August ===
- The West Bank settlement of Ariel is founded.

== 1979 ==
=== March ===
- United Nations Security Council Resolution 446 is passed. The resolution states that it "Determines that the policy and practices of Israel in establishing settlements in the Palestinian and other Arab territories occupied since 1967 have no legal validity and constitute a serious obstruction to achieving a comprehensive, just and lasting peace in the Middle East". The resolution is passed 12 votes to 0 with 3 abstentions. This is the first of many such UN resolutions against the Israeli settlements.

== 1980 ==
- The Knesset asserts Jerusalem's status as the nation's "eternal and indivisible capital" by passing the Jerusalem Law.
- The UN declares the Jerusalem Law "null and void", and the Security Council in resolution 465 ordered Israel to dismantle the settlements.

== 1981 ==
=== December ===
- Israel extends its law to the Golan Heights, passing the Golan Heights Law, which grants permanent residency, ID cards, and Israeli citizenship to the residents, but does not formally annex the territory.

== 1983 ==
- Settler population. West Bank: 22,800. Gaza Strip: 900. East Jerusalem: 76,095. Golan Heights: 6,800. Total: 106,595.
- The West Bank settlement of Giv'at Ze'ev is founded.

== 1985 ==
- Settler population. West Bank: 44,100. Gaza Strip: 1,900. East Jerusalem: 103,900. Golan Heights: 8,700. Total: 158,700.
- The West Bank settlements of Betar Illit and Oranit are founded.

== 1989 ==
- Settler population. West Bank: 69,800. Gaza Strip: 3,000. East Jerusalem: 117,100. Golan Heights: 10,000 Total: 199,900.

== 1990 ==
- Settler population. West Bank: 78,600. Gaza Strip: 3,300. East Jerusalem: 135,000. Golan Heights: 10,600. Total: 227,500.

== 1991 ==
- Settler population. West Bank: 90,300. Gaza Strip: 3,800. East Jerusalem: 137,300. Golan Heights: 11,600. Total: 243,000.

== 1992 ==
- Settler population. West Bank: 101,100. Gaza Strip: 4,300. East Jerusalem: 141,000. Golan Heights: 12,000. Total: 258,400.

== 1993 ==
- Settler population. West Bank: 111,600. Gaza Strip: 4,800. East Jerusalem: 152,800. Golan Heights: 12,600. Total: 281,800.

== 1994 ==
- Israel begins work on the West Bank barrier.

== 1995 ==
- Settler population. West Bank: 133,200. Gaza Strip: 5,300. East Jerusalem: 157,300. Golan Heights: 13,400. Total: 309,200.

== 1996 ==
- Settler population. West Bank: 142,700-139,974. Gaza Strip: 5,600. East Jerusalem: 160,400. Golan Heights: 13,800. Total: 322,500.
- The West Bank settlement of Modi'in Illit is founded.

== 1997 ==
- Settler population. West Bank: 154,400-152,277. Gaza Strip: 5,700. East Jerusalem: 161,416. Golan Heights: 14,300. Total: 335,816.

== 1998 ==
- Settler population. West Bank: 163,300-164,800. Gaza Strip: 6,100. East Jerusalem: 165,967. Golan Heights: 14,900. Total: 350,267.

== 1999 ==
- Settler population. West Bank: 177,411-177,327. Gaza Strip: 6,337. East Jerusalem: 170,123. Golan Heights: 15,313. Total: 369,184.

== 2000 ==
- Settler population. West Bank: 192,976-190,206. Gaza Strip: 6,678. East Jerusalem: 172,250. Golan Heights: 15,955. Total: 387,859.

=== September ===
- Al-Aqsa Intifada begins.

== 2001 ==
- Settler population. West Bank: 200,297.

== 2002 ==
- Settler population. West Bank: 214,722-211,416. Gaza Strip:7,277. East Jerusalem: 175,617. Golan Heights: 16,503. Total: 414,119.

== 2003 ==
- Settler population. West Bank: 224,669-223,954. Gaza Strip:7,556. East Jerusalem: 178,601. Golan Heights: 16,791. Total: 427,617.

=== April ===
- Israel and the Palestinians agree to the Road map for peace plan, in which Israel undertakes to freeze settlement building in all the occupied territories to accompany unconditional cessation of violence by the Palestinians.

== 2004 ==
- Settler population. West Bank: 234,487-235,263. Gaza Strip:7,826. East Jerusalem: 181,587-176,566. Golan Heights: 17,265. Total: 441,828.
- The Israeli Government and Parliament approve the evacuation of the Israeli settlements from the Gaza Strip and four settlements from northern Samaria." Nurit Kliot, "Resettlement of Refugees in Finland and Cyprus: A Comparative Analysis and Possible Lessons for Israel", in Arie Marcelo Kacowicz, Pawel Lutomski. Population Resettlement in International Conflicts: A Comparative Study, Lexington Books, 2007, p. 57.

== 2005 ==
- Settler population. West Bank: 258,988-247,514. Gaza Strip:0. East Jerusalem: 184,057-178,913. Golan Heights: 17,793. Total: 460,838.

=== March ===
- The Sasson report finds that Israeli state bodies have been discreetly diverting millions of shekels to build West Bank settlements and outposts that were illegal under Israeli law. The report exposes the existence of at least 150 such illegal outposts that lack proper government authorization.
- The Israeli government confirms plans to increase the size of the Maale Adumim settlement, in the West Bank near Jerusalem, by 3,500 homes. Chief Palestinian negotiator Saeb Erekat criticizes the move, saying "[This] sabotages all efforts seeking to get the peace process back on track," and "The Israeli government wants to determine Jerusalem's fate by presenting the settlements and wall as a fait accompli.".

=== August ===
- All 21 settlements in the Gaza Strip and four in the northern West Bank (or northern Samaria) are forcibly evacuated as part of Israel's unilateral disengagement plan.

== 2006 ==
- Settler population. West Bank: 268,400-261,879. East Jerusalem: 181,823. Golan Heights: 18,105. Total: 461,807-468,328.

== 2007 ==
- Settler population. West Bank: 276,462 -282,000. East Jerusalem: 184,707. Golan Heights: 18,105. Total: 475,404.

=== November ===
- Annapolis Conference is held. Palestinians demand settlement freeze as precondition for talks however Israel stands by plan to build new settlements in East Jerusalem.

=== December ===
- Israel decides to build 300 more Israeli homes in the Har Homa neighborhood of East Jerusalem, near Bethlehem. The move is condemned by the United States and the European Union.

== 2008 ==
- West Bank settler population: 290,697.

=== March ===
- The Jerusalem municipality announces plans to build 600 new housing units in East Jerusalem. US Secretary of State Condoleezza Rice states in response that settlement expansion should stop and was inconsistent with 'road map' obligations.

=== November ===
- The Israeli Supreme Court gives the Israeli government 45 days to explain why it hasn't taken down the illegal outpost of Migron in accord with its commitments to the 2003 Road map for peace plan.

=== December ===
- The Gaza War begins.

== 2009 ==
=== January ===
- The Gaza War concludes.

=== June ===
- US President Barack Obama makes his famous Cairo speech in which he says "The United States does not accept the legitimacy of continued Israeli settlements".
- Israeli Defense Minister Ehud Barak authorizes the construction of 300 new homes in West Bank settlements.

=== August ===
- US President Barack Obama demands a complete freeze on settlement construction in the West Bank, including East Jerusalem. The Israeli government agrees to a freeze in the West Bank. Peace Now argues that Israel is attempting to fool the United States. On 25 August 2009 Netanyahu says that he will attempt to gain an agreement with the U.S. to continue building settlements before attempting to talk with the Palestinians. On 28 August 2009 US officials said they would not impose conditions on the parties, but that it would be up to the parties themselves to determine if the threshold for talks had been met. Education Minister Gideon Sa'ar defended the freeze as an attempt to "protect the vital interests - Jerusalem and the relationship with the United States - and to avoid national isolation, because we won't be able to do the things close to our hearts while under international isolation."

=== September ===
- Hamas leader Khaled Meshaal called Israel's proposal to temporarily halt settlement construction in exchange for improved relations with Arab countries "Dangerous", as he viewed it as an attempt to avoid US demands. The Hamas leader's opposition to the Israeli proposal was supported by Arab League Secretary General Amr Moussa.

=== November ===
- The United States government voices their dismay at the approved by the Israel's interior ministry of 900 additional housing units at a Jewish settlement in East Jerusalem. A White House spokesman says the move makes it "more difficult" to revive Israeli-Palestinian peace talks. Settlements on occupied territory are considered illegal under international law, though Israel disputes this and consider Gilo, the planned settlement area "an integral part of Jerusalem".

=== December ===
- The Israeli government orders a 10-month lull in permits for new settlement homes in the West Bank. The restrictions, which Israeli politicians and media have referred to as a "freeze", do not apply to East Jerusalem (whose de facto annexation by Israel is not recognised internationally), municipal buildings, schools, synagogues and other community infrastructure in the settlements. About 3,000 homes already under construction will be allowed to proceed. The Israeli government said the move was aimed at restarting peace talks, but Palestinian officials said it was insufficient. Palestinian officials have refused to rejoin peace talks until a total building halt is imposed, including in East Jerusalem. The announcement followed calls by the US government for a total freeze in settlement building. The US government, the European Union, Russia and the UN have criticized Israel's plans to continue building in East Jerusalem but both the US and the EU have stated that there should be no preconditions for resuming the suspended peace talks related to Israel's Road Map requirement to freeze settlements. although Palestinian participants would have to give prior acceptance of Israel's claim to statehood and refrain from violence.

== 2010 ==
=== March ===
- Israel announces plans to construct 1600 settler homes in the Ramat Shlomo settlement in East Jerusalem during United States Vice President Joe Biden's visit to the region. Biden condemns the decision saying "The substance and timing of the announcement, particularly with the launching of proximity talks, is precisely the kind of step that undermines the trust we need . . . and runs counter to the constructive discussions I've had in Israel."
- United Nations Secretary-General Ban Ki-moon stated "The world has condemned Israel's expansion plans in East Jerusalem. Let us be clear: all settlement activity is illegal anywhere in occupied territory, and this must stop." He spoke both for the United Nations and the Middle East Quartet.
- The mayor of Jerusalem unveiled a plan to demolish 22 Israeli Arab homes in East Jerusalem to make way for a public park and tourist site.

== 2011 ==
=== February ===
- The U.S. vetoes a draft resolution to condemn all Israeli settlements in Palestinian territory as illegal.

== 2017 ==
As of January 1, 2017 the West Bank settlement population was 420,899.

== 2020 ==
In 2020 the settler population in East Jerusalem was around 220,000.

== 2021 ==
In 2021 the settler population in the Golan Heights was almost 27,000

== 2022 ==
As of January 30, 2022 the West Bank settlement population was 490,493.

The Israeli government’s Coalition Agreement of December 1, 2022 between incoming prime minister Benjamin Netanyahu's Likud party and the far-right, ultra-nationalist Religious Zionism party of Bezalel Smotrich states that "the prime minister will work towards the formulation and promotion of a policy whereby sovereignty is applied to Judea and Samaria" (biblical names for the occupied West Bank). Smotrich would take up a new post of minister within the defense ministry, where he would oversee civil matters in the West Bank. Other commitments included legalization of dozens of unauthorized settlements and the provision of large funds for road building and public transport in the West Bank. To the concern of the US administration, Netanyahu made agreements with coalition partners to expand Israeli settlements and legalize dozens of Israeli outposts.

== 2023 ==
=== January ===
The new Israeli government told the Israeli High Court that the state would reverse its previous position that Israeli settlers leave Homesh, a yeshiva built on private Palestinian property, and that the government intends to change the Disengagement Law. The Palestinian landowners appealed to the court because they have been prevented from reaching their property due to settlers in the Israeli outpost blocking access. The State Attorney's Office said "the political echelon wishes to announce that, in accordance with the coalition agreements that were signed, it intends to act as soon as possible to amend the guidelines permitting Israelis to remain" and requested a further three months to submit another opinion.

In response to the decision to grant the government 90 days to explain its decision to reverse course on Homesh, the US said that "The Homesh outpost in the West Bank is illegal. It is illegal even under Israeli Law. Our call to refrain from unilateral steps certainly includes any decision to create a new settlement, to legalize outposts or allowing building of any kind deep in the West Bank, adjacent to Palestinian communities or on private Palestinian land."

=== February ===
Israel approved the legalization of nine illegal settler outposts. A US spokesman said "We strongly oppose expansion of settlements, and we're deeply concerned by reports about a process to legalize outposts that are illegal under Israeli law. We are seeking more information from the Israeli government on what has actually been decided." The Palestinian Authority condemned the decision as crossing "all red lines".

At a UNSC meeting of 20 February, the Council issued a formal statement condemning Israel's plan for settlement expansion on Palestinian territory. It was the first action the United States has permitted against Israel in six years. The statement said "The Security Council reiterates that continuing Israeli settlement activities are dangerously imperiling the viability of the two-State solution based on the 1967 lines" and "The Security Council expresses deep concern and dismay with Israel's announcement on February 12." The UAE did not push a draft resolution to a vote "given the positive talks between the parties." Netanyahu's office condemned the formal statement saying "The statement should not have been made and the United States should not have joined it."

Finance Minister Bezalel Smotrich took charge of most of the Civil Administration, obtaining broad authority over civilian issues in the West Bank. Israeli peace groups condemned the move as de jure annexation of occupied territories. Rights lawyer Michael Sfard tweeted that the action "entails de jure annexation of the West Bank".

Daniel Kurtzer, former US ambassador to Israel, accused the government of breaking a written agreement with Washington by legalising a "group of hardline nationalist and religious settlements" and called on the Biden administration to prevent Israel's "creeping annexation" of the West Bank.

=== March ===
Israel repealed a 2005 law whereby four Israeli settlements, Homesh, Sa-Nur, Ganim and Kadim, were dismantled as part of the Israeli disengagement from Gaza. The move was condemned by the PA and the EU, the latter calling for the revocation of the new law. Critics, including some of the Israeli opposition and NGOs supporting Palestinian rights, denounced the move as a prelude to annexation of the West Bank. The US, in addition to denouncing the move, also summoned the Israeli ambassador to express concern.

=== May ===
With Israeli government approval, Israeli settlers relocated a yeshiva established on private Palestinian land in Homesh, to a nearby spot designated state-owned land. The relocation was carried out despite international opposition, including repeatedly from the U.S., and the opposition of the Israeli attorney general.

=== June ===
Israel shortened the procedure of approving settlement construction and gave Finance Minister Bezalel Smotrich the authority to approve one of the stages, changing the system operating for the last 27 years. The United States said it was "deeply troubled" by the Israeli plans that explicitly violate previous commitments made by Israel to the Biden administration. "The United States is deeply troubled by the Israeli government’s reported decision to advance planning for over 4,000 settlement units in the West Bank. We are similarly concerned by reports of changes to Israel’s system of settlement administration that expedite the planning and approvals of settlements". Tor Wennesland, United Nations Special Coordinator for the Middle East Peace Process urged a halt and reversal of the decisions and said "I am deeply concerned by the Israeli Government’s decision yesterday to alter settlement planning procedures that have been in place since 1996, which is expected to expedite settlement expansion. I am also alarmed by the anticipated advancement next week of over 4,000 settlement housing units by Israeli planning authorities". The Israeli press reported that the US has informed Israel that the Negev forum on regional cooperation will be postponed as a result of the Israeli moves.

The US criticized Israel's advancement of plans for 5,700 new homes in Jewish settlements and said it was "an obstacle to peace".

=== July ===
In its first six months, construction of 13,000 housing units in settlements, almost triple the amount advanced in the whole of 2022.

In a CNN interview on 9 July 2023, US President Joe Biden said that extreme cabinet ministers in the coalition that back settling "anywhere they want" in the West Bank are "part of the problem" in the conflict.

=== December ===
On December 4, the Lower Aqueduct plan for 1792 housing units was approved in an expedited process, marking the first major new East Jerusalem settlement plan in East Jerusalem since Givat HaMatos in 2012.

== 2024 ==
=== February ===
After Palestinian gunmen killed one Israeli and injured five Israelis near Ma'ale Adumim, Israel's far-right Finance Minister Bezalel Smotrich in February 2024 announced a "settlement response" after speaking to Prime Minister Benjamin Netanyahu and Defense Minister Yoav Gallant, as "any harm to us will lead to more construction and more development and more of our hold all over the country", with 2,350 more homes in Ma'ale Adumim and 300 more homes in Kedar being arranged for approval, as well as 700 more homes in Efrat slated to be built. American Secretary of State Antony Blinken criticized the announcement, stating that new Israeli settlements are "inconsistent with international law" and "counter-productive to reaching an enduring peace", risking "Israel’s security".

=== March ===
Israel's government in early March 2024 fully approved 694 more settler homes for Efrat, and additionally progressed the approval of 2,452 more settler homes in Ma'ale Adumim and 330 more settler homes in Kedar, reported Haaretz.

In late March 2024, Minister Smotrich declared that the Israeli government had newly seized 10 km^{2} of land in the West Bank, "promoting settlement through hard work and in a strategic manner all over the country". Some of the seized land were in the Jordan Valley, and some were between the Israeli settlements Ma'ale Adumim and Kedar. Settlement watchdog group Peace Now claimed that this land seizure was the largest by the Israeli government since the Oslo Accords of 1993. The European Union confirmed that in the past year Israel had advanced the most West Bank settlements in decades.

== 2025 ==
=== May ===
On 29 May it was announced that Israeli ministers had approved 22 new Jewish settlements in the occupied West Bank, with several already existing as outposts that did not have government authorisation but would be made legal under Israeli law. Defence Minister Israel Katz described the move as preventative against establishment of a Palestinian state and a security measure. These 22 settlements are Atarot Eder, Beit Horon North, Inbar, Ahiya, Nofei Prat, Adei Ad, Ir Hatmarim, Gvionit, Tevez, Gadi Camp, Maalot Halhul, Afeka, Yonadav, Mitzpe Ziv, Kedem Arava, Homesh, Sa-Nur, Mt. Ibal, El-Nave, Rehavam, Maoz Zvi and Havot Yair.

In August 2025, U.S. House Speaker Mike Johnson, one of the highest-ranking American officials ever to visit an Israeli settlement in the West Bank, traveled to Shilo and Ariel, where he delivered a speech at a celebratory event attended by Ariel Mayor Yair Chetboun and other West Bank settlement leaders. During his remarks, Johnson declared that the "mountains of Judea and Samaria" belong to the Jewish people "by right."

=== December ===
Israel announced the formation of 19 new settlements in the West Bank, 11 new settlements to be built, 8 outposts and neighborhoods recognized as settlements, including two evacuated in 2005. Smotrich says that the move aims to thwart the idea of a Palestinian state. The new settlements are Kida, Esh Kodesh, Givat Harel, Mishol, Kochav Hashachar-North, Nof Gilad, Ganim, Kadim, Shalem, Har Bezek, Reihanit, Rosh Ha'ayin-East, Tammun, P’nei Kedem, Yatziv, Ya’ar El Keren, Allenby, Yitav-West, and Nahal Doron.

== See also ==
- Chronology of Aliyah in modern times
- Israelite highland settlement
- Timeline of Israeli history
