= List of villages depopulated during the Arab–Israeli conflict =

Below is a list of villages depopulated or destroyed during the Arab–Israeli conflict.

== 1880–1946 ==
=== Arab villages ===
A number of these villages, those in the Jezreel Valley, were inhabited by tenants of land which was sold by a variety of owners, some local and others absentee landlord families, such as the Karkabi, Tueini, Farah and Khuri families and Sursock family of Lebanon. In some cases land was sold directly by local fellahim (peasant owners). The sale of land to Jewish organizations meant that tenant farmers were displaced.

List of Palestinian villages from which tenant farmers were uprooted before 1948, with the cause of the uprooting (i.e., sale by landlord or some other cause) given along with the name of Jewish settlements on newly acquired land (in parentheses) can be seen below.

Safed district

- al-Mutila, 1896 (Metula) Land, 12,800 dunams, sold under Ottoman law by landlord, a Christian from Sidon named Jabur Bey, to Baron de Rothschild's chief officer Joshua Ossovetski. Druze villagers displaced.
- Difna, 1939 (Dafna)
- al-Manara, unknown date (Manara) 2538 dunams of land purchased by the Jewish National Fund from the landlord, Asa'ad Bey Khuri of Beirut.
- Najmat as-Subah, unknown date (Ayelet HaShahar)

Acre district

- Ja'atoun, unknown date (Ga'aton)
- Khirbat Jiddin, 1946, other sources says 1948 (Yehiam)

Tiberias district

- Um al-Junah, unknown date (Degania Bet)
- Malhamiyah, 1902 According to Edward Said, the Jewish farming village of Menahemia) was established in 1902 on land purchased by the Jewish Colonization Association in 1901; 3,000 dunams were purchased directly from local fellahim, 700 dunhams from local landlords, and over 60,000 dunams from landlords in Beirut; the Sursuq, Tuenis, and Mudawwar families. The Arab tenant farmers were evicted by Ottoman authorities.
- Sha'arah, 1926–1927 (Omer Sha’ara, today Shadmot Dvora)
- Sarona, 1910 (Sharona)
- Sarjuna, unknown date (Shorshim, today HaZor'im)
- Yammah, 1901 (Yavniel)

Nazareth district

- Jabata, 1926 (Gvat)
- Khunaifis, 1926 (Sarid)
- Ganigar, Jinjar, Jenjar, Junjar, 1922, Ginegar,
- Rab an-Nasrah, unknown date (Mazra)
- Tal al-’Adas, unknown date (Tel Adashim)
- al-'Afoulah, 1925 (Afula)
- al-Foulah, 1910 (Merhavia)
- Mashah, 1902 (Kfar Tavor)
- Samouniyah, unknown date (Shimron nature reserve, Timrat)
- Umm Kubei, unknown date

Beisan district

- Khirbat Bayt Ilfa, unknown date (Beit Alpha)
- Shatah, unknown date (Beit HaShita)
- Tall al-Fir, 1922 (none)
- Jaloud, 1922 (Ein Harod)
- Zarra'a, Jewish National Fund bought the land in the 1930s, Tirat Tzvi established on the site in 1938
- Jisr Majami

Haifa district

- Jadroun, 1925 (Kfar Bialik)
- Kurdani, unknown date (Afek)
- Kafr Ata, 1925 (Kfar Ata – today Kiryat Ata)
- al-Majdal, 1925 (none)
- al-Harbaj, 1924 (Kfar Hasidim)
- al-Harithiyah, 1924 (Sha'ar HaAmakim)
- Tab’oun, unknown date (Tivon, today Kiryat Tivon)
- Qusqous, unknown date (Alonim)
- Jida, 1925 (Ramat Yishai)
- Tal ash-Shamam, 1925 (Kfar Yehoshua)
- Qamoun, 1925 (Yokneam)
- Ja’ara, unknown date (Ein HaShofet)
- Um ad-Dafouf, unknown date (Dalia)
- Um at-Tout, unknown date (none)
- Shifiyah, unknown date (Meir Shfeya)
- Zamarin (Zikhron Ya'akov), 1948 – Following Jewish settlement in 1882, Arabs continued to live and work in the community alongside Jews.
- Um al-’Alaq, unknown date, (Ramat HaNadiv)
- ash-Shounah, unknown date (none), maybe identical to Khirbat al-Shuna destroyed in 1948
- Zarghaniyah, unknown date (Binyamina)
- al-Buraij, unknown date (Binyamina)
- Natalah, unknown date (No data)
- Nazlah, unknown date (none)
- Safsaf, unknown date (none)
- Hadidun, unknown date (none)
- Karkour, unknown date (Ein Shemer, Gan HaShomron, Karkur, Tel Shalom)
- Bidous, unknown date (Maanit)
- Shaikh Hilw, unknown date (Nahliel, now part from Hadera)
- Zardarah, unknown date (Gan Shmuel)
- Baika, unknown date (Hadera)
- al-Marah, 1903 (Givat Ada)
- ’Aabiyah, 1929 (Pardes Hanna)
- Sheikh Bureik Sold during the early 1920s, by the Sursuk family to the Jewish National Fund. The Arab tenants were evicted and in 1925 an agricultural settlement also named Sheikh Abreik was established there by the Hapoel HaMizrachi, a Zionist political party.

Tulkarm district

- Shaikh Muhammad, unknown date (Elyashiv)

Jerusalem district

- Beit Jimal

Ramla district

- Kafr Wariyah, unknown date (Kfar Uria)
- Jindas (Ginaton)

=== Jewish villages ===
==== 1929 Palestine riots ====
During the 1929 Palestine riots:

- Bat Yam
- Be'er Tuvia
- Giv'on HaHadashah
- Hartuv
- Kfar Uria
- Kiryat Ata
- Motza
- Ramat Rachel
- Hebron

==== 1936–1939 Arab revolt in Palestine ====
During the 1936–1939 Arab revolt in Palestine:

- Kfar Shiloah
- Silwan Jewish population removed by the Kehillah Welfare Bureau and later the British authorities during the 1936–1939 Arab revolt in Palestine
- Kfar Etzion
- Hebron

== 1948 Arab–Israeli War ==
=== Arab villages ===
Palestinian Arab residents were expelled from hundreds of towns and villages by the Israel Defense Forces, or fled in fear as the Israeli army advanced. Around 400 Arab towns and villages were depopulated.

=== Jewish villages ===
The main Jewish areas depopulated in 1948 were the Jewish Quarter of the Old City of Jerusalem and the Gush Etzion. Approximately 30–40 km^{2} of land was owned by Jews in the areas which became the West Bank and Gaza Strip (approximately 6,000 km^{2}); some of this land was uninhabited.

In areas that became the West Bank

- North Jerusalem bloc (Atarot and Neve Yaakov)
- Dead Sea block (Kalia and Beit HaArava)
- Jewish Quarter (Jerusalem)
- Gush Etzion bloc near Jerusalem (Ein Tzurim, Kfar Etzion, Masuot Yitzhak, Revadim)

In areas that became Gaza Strip (All-Palestine protectorate)

- Kfar Darom (resettled but evacuated as part of the Israeli disengagement from Gaza in 2005)

In Transjordan

- Tel Or

Many of these areas were repopulated after the Six-Day War.

== Six-Day War ==
=== West Bank ===
Three Arab villages, Bayt Nuba, Imwas and Yalo, located in the Latrun Corridor were destroyed on the orders of Yitzhak Rabin due to the corridor's strategic location and route to Jerusalem and because of the residents' alleged aiding of Egyptian commandos in their attack on the city of Lod. The residents of the three villages were offered compensation but were not allowed to return.

Hebron/Bethlehem area

- Surit
- Beit Awwa
- Beit Mirsem
- Shuyoukh

Jordan Valley

- al-Jiftlik (depopulated but soon repopulated)
- Agarith
- Huseirat

Jerusalem area

- Nabi Samwil

In the Negev/Sinai Desert

- Auja al-Hafir – A demilitarized zone

=== Golan Heights ===
Over 100,000 Golan Heights residents were evacuated from about 25 villages whether on orders of the Syrian government or through fear of an attack by the Israel Defense Forces and expulsion after the ceasefire. During the following months, more than a hundred Syrian villages were destroyed by Israel.

== 1979 Egypt–Israel Peace Treaty ==
=== Israeli settlements ===
Israeli settlements in the Sinai Peninsula were evacuated as a result of the 1979 Egypt–Israel peace treaty.

- Avshalom
- Dikla
- Netiv HaAsara, Sinai
- Ofira
- Pri'el
- Sadot
- Sufa
- Talmei Yosef
- Yamit

== Israel's unilateral disengagement plan ==
As a part of Israel's unilateral disengagement plan, 21 Israeli settlements in the Gaza Strip and 4 in the West Bank were evacuated. Under the framework of the plan, these towns and villages were categorized into four distinct geographical groups: Group A comprised the isolated Gaza Strip communities of Netzarim, Morag, and Kfar Darom; Group B included the villages of Ganim, Sa-Nur, Kadim, and Homesh in the West Bank; Group C encompassed the various towns and settlements making up the main Gush Katif bloc in Gaza; and Group D contained the northern Gaza Strip communities of Dugit, Elei Sinai, and Nisanit.

== Since 2005 ==
On 5 November 2020, Israeli bulldozers demolished most of the village of Khirbet Humsa al-Fawqa and forced 73 of its Palestinian residents, including 41 children to leave in what was the largest demolition in years. On 4 February 2021, Israel razed for the second time because of what it claimed was an illegal settlement next to a military firing range. On 7 July 2021, it was demolished by Israel again for at least the third time.

In May 2023, the Israeli army destroyed the village of Ein Samiya, forcibly expelling 170 people.

== See also ==
- Killings and massacres during the 1948 Palestine War
- Transfer Committee
- 1948 Palestinian expulsion and flight

== Bibliography ==
- Avneri, Arieh L. (1984). The Claim of Dispossession: Jewish Land-settlement and the Arabs, 1878–1948. Transaction Publishers. ISBN 0-87855-964-7.
- Barron, J.B., ed. (1923). Palestine: Report and General Abstracts of the Census of 1922. Government of Palestine.
- Government of Palestine, Department of Statistics (1945). Village Statistics, April, 1945.
- Grootkerk, Salomon E. (2000). Ancient sites in Galilee: a toponymic gazetteer (Illustrated ed.). BRILL. ISBN 978-90-04-11535-4.
- Hadawi, S. (1970). Village Statistics of 1945: A Classification of Land and Area ownership in Palestine. Palestine Liberation Organization Research Centre.
- Huneidi, Sahar; Khalidi, W. (2001). A Broken Trust: Herbert Samuel, Zionism and the Palestinians 1920-1925. I.B.Tauris. ISBN 1-86064-172-5.
- Kark, R.; Oren-Nordheim, Michal (2001). Jerusalem and its environs: quarters, neighborhoods, villages, 1800-1948 (Illustrated ed.). Wayne State University Press. ISBN 978-0-8143-2909-2.
- Karmon, Y. (1960). "An Analysis of Jacotin's Map of Palestine" (PDF). Israel Exploration Journal. 10 (3, 4): 155–173, 244–253. Archived from the original (PDF) on 2019-12-22.
- Khalidi, W. (1992). All That Remains: The Palestinian Villages Occupied and Depopulated by Israel in 1948. Washington D.C.: Institute for Palestine Studies. ISBN 0-88728-224-5.
- Pringle, D. (1997). Secular Buildings in the Crusader Kingdom of Jerusalem: An Archaeological Gazetter. Cambridge University Press. ISBN 0521-46010-7.
- Rogan, E.; Shlaim, A. (2001). The War for Palestine: Rewriting the History of 1948. Cambridge University Press. ISBN 0-521-79476-5.
- Said, E.; Hitchens, C. (2001). Blaming the Victims: Spurious Scholarship and the Palestinian Question. Verso. p. 217. ISBN 1859843409.
