= Homash =

Homash may refer to:

- Scarf in ornamental style used by belly dancers
- Homash (Palestine), a community

== See also ==
- Homesh, an Israeli settlement in the West Bank established in 1978 and closed in 2005
