= David Ha'ivri =

American-Israeli religious Zionist leader

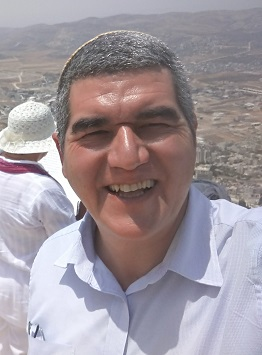
David Ha'ivri

David Ha'ivri (Hebrew: דוד העברי; born Jason David Axelrod, 1967) is an American-born Israeli independent political strategist, who focuses on foreign relations, working closely with Christian Zionists and leading politicians in Washington DC. He emigrated as a child with his family from the United States to Israel at the age of 11, completed high school, and served in the IDF. Ha'ivri is an Orthodox Jew, and lives with his wife and eight children in Kfar Tapuach in the West Bank. He is a religious Zionist leader, writer, and speaker. In November 2018, Ha'ivri was elected to the Shomron Regional Municipal council. In May 2021, he was elected as Second to the Chairman of the Council.

== Confusion ==
Some articles have confused David Ha'ivri with another Kahanist also named David Axelrod, said to be the great-grandson of Leon Trotsky (note that these are two different people).

== Documentary films ==
David Ha'ivri has been featured in a number of documentary films dealing with issues that he is involved in. Canadian producer Igal Hecht's film 35 Acres explores the issue of the Temple Mount the most contentious piece of real estate on the face of the Earth. Holy for both Jews and Muslims the Temple Mount, is one of the most volatile areas in Jerusalem. Many say that those who control it, control the entire land. This film shows both Palestinians and Israelis whose entire lives revolve around that area. Ha'ivri has been involved in the Jewish side of this story for over 25 years. Ha'ivri has also been interviewed by major media outlets BBC, CNN, Al-Jazeera and others.

== Present ==
=== Shomron Liaison Office ===
Ha'ivri is the founder of the Shomron Liaison Office, an NGO that worked closely with the local government promoting public relations for the towns of the region. In this capacity, he serves as English-language spokesman, interacting with all foreign language journalists. The Shomron Liaison Office under his direction has developed partnership and pen pal programs connecting schoolchildren in the West Bank with their peers around the world. He delivers speeches internationally to a wide range of groups, as well as hosting tours in the West Bank. As a spokesman for the Shomron Regional Council, Ha'ivri interacts with international media, foreign government representatives and philanthropists. From 2008, he served as strategic adviser to Regional Council head Gershon Mesika on international affairs. He served as the Advisor of Mesika's successor Yossi Dagan before becoming his deputy in May 2021.

=== Empowering local activists and spokespeople ===
In 2009, Ha'ivri conducted professional training for 30 spokespeople from a wide range of settlements in the West Bank aimed at improving their abilities to express themselves in English and so to improve the general public relations of the settlers in the area. He contracted Ron Bowman Director of Dale Carnegie Training in Israel provide a 13-week course for the local activists.

=== Student volunteer programs ===
He organizes student volunteer programs in the West Bank settlements. In these programs, American youth are introduced to aspects of planting and building. They are offered an opportunity to take part in the actual expansion of the Jewish growth there.

=== UN Settlement Prize ===
In August 2009, Ha'ivri advocated that the United Nations award the Jewish settlements in the West Bank an international prize for settlement activity. The annual prize, the Habitat Scroll of Honor, is handed out annually to acknowledge "outstanding contributions in developing and improving settlements and the quality of urban life".

=== Social media activism ===
Ha'ivri maintains active Twitter and Facebook accounts. He was selected as one of the "25 most influential people on 'Jewish Twitter'" in 2016.

=== Connecting with American Zionists ===
Ha'ivri has developed a number of programs aimed and establishing a connection for the settlements in the West Bank with Jewish communities and supporters around the world. One of those programs is the Purim package distribution to IDF soldiers in cooperation with the Zionist Organization of America. Thousands of gift packages are packaged by students in schools in the West Bank and then distributed it soldiers throughout the region and the whole country. Another project devised by Ha'ivri is twinning schools in West Bank with school children in the Jewish communities outside of Israel. The project is implemented by the Israel Connect program.

== Early years: radical political activism ==
As a youth, Ha'ivri became involved with rabbi Meir Kahane's Kach, and was already active in the 1984 election that saw Kahane elected to Knesset, and was a close friend of the rabbi's son, Binyamin Ze'ev Kahane. The Kach party was banned from running in the 1988 Knesset elections, and has since been added to terrorist watch lists by Israel, Canada, and the United States. Younger Ha'ivri had several confrontations with the Israeli government. In 2001, Israeli Attorney General Elyakim Rubinstein ruled that the slogan publicized by far-right activists, "No Arabs, no terror", constitutes incitement to racism and offence, especially to the 20% of Arabs who have Israeli citizenship. Rubinstein handed his ruling to the police to investigate. As a result, in January 2005, the Jerusalem Magistrate's court sentenced Ha'ivri to four months of community service for distributing the T-shirts. However, in an interview with The New York Times newspaper, Ha'ivri said he no longer engaged in such activism, adding that, at age 43, he had mellowed, even if his core convictions had not. "I'm a little older now, a little more mature", he said.

=== Kfar Tapuach ===
In the late 1980s, he formed a group of Rabbi Kahane's students at the Yeshivat HaRaayon HaYehudi, which later moved to the town of Kfar Tapuach. After Binyamin Ze'ev Kahane's assassination in December 2000, Ha'ivri took on responsibility for his bi-weekly publication, Darka Shel Torah and HaMeir L'David, a publishing group which prints and distributes the works of Rabbi Meir Kahane and Binyamin Ze'ev Kahane. Ha'ivri has been active in leadership of the town, and has served as the town mayor, head of security, and youth director - organizing educational and social activity, while also offering aid to at-risk teens and developing programs for them in the West Bank. He has published articles on these issues.

=== 2005 Gaza pullout ===
In the time leading up to the 2005 Gaza Disengagement, Ha'ivri, together with Yisrael Meir Cohen, founded Revava (Hebrew: רבבה means ten thousand), an organization which initially aimed at preventing the Gaza disengagement by encouraging nationwide protests to tie up the Israeli security forces, based on a play on words, and on the concept that ten thousand activists could actually stop the Israeli pullout from Gaza and North of the West Bank.

=== Temple Mount ===
In 2005, Ha'ivri headed a campaign calling for 10,000 Jews to ascend to the Temple Mount.

== Ideology ==
=== Annexing the West Bank ===
He advocates that all territory controlled by the Israeli government and army between the Mediterranean Sea and Jordan River rightfully belongs to the Jewish people, and should be officially annexed by the State of Israel, and that the non-Jewish population need to accept the Israel authority and be loyal to the State, Ha'Ivri believes that non-Jews who "intend to be disloyal to the country...need to find other places to live". Periodically, Ha'ivri goes on tour speaking on behalf of the settlements. In reply to US President Barack Obama's pressure on Israel to stop Jewish settlement growth in the West Bank, he said: "We are frustrated by the Chutzpah (audacity) of Obama and other world leaders to intervene and tell Israel what to do. The only country in the world where the international leaders can legitimately suggest ethnic cleansing is Israel. Anywhere else there would be an outcry."

=== Joseph's tomb ===
Ha'ivri is active in a campaign to restore Joseph's tomb in Shechem (Nablus) - a site holy to Christians, Muslims, and Jewish populations in the region. He calls on the Israeli government to retake the site and allow Jewish settlers to rebuild the yeshiva that once occupied the site. In the 2010s he was involved in organizing monthly visits for Jewish worshippers in cooperation with the local IDF command.
