= Gershon Mesika =

Israeli lawyer and politician

Gershon Mesika (Hebrew: גרשון מסיקה; born 5 July 1952) an Israeli lawyer and politician. He has served as head of the Shomron Regional Council but has been detained as a result of his role in a "massive corruption scandal" and subsequently replaced by acting head Yossi Dagan.

== Early life ==
Mesika was born in Ashdod in Israel to a Tunisian-Jewish family. He is an Israeli lawyer. Since 1982, he has lived in the Israeli settlement of Elon Moreh with his wife and family. He previously owned a local armored limousine service.

In November 2007, he was elected director of Shomron Regional local government. Immediately after being elected as head of the Shomron Regional Council, Mesika took on the issue of restoring Joseph's Tomb in the city of Nablus. Under Mesika's direction efforts have been ongoing since the end of 2007 to renovate the site.

== Politics ==
As a leader of the Israeli settlers in the West Bank, Mesika called on his constituents to vote right in the 2009 Knesset elections. In a letter to his constituents, Mesika wrote "It doesn't matter which nationalist camp party you vote for, the main thing is to vote!". He also called upon the residents to "get involved and help out the nationalist parties, each person according to his or her preference. The main thing is to volunteer and act in order to strengthen the nationalist camp".

He has called on Jewish families living in West Bank settlements to have more children to continue the exponential growth in the area. As an advocate for growth in the Jewish communities in the Shomron, Mesika symbolic tore up building freeze orders issued by Israeli defense minister Ehud Barak. He termed the restrictions aimed at Jewish population only as racist decree and called on the Israel government to support the growth and development of these communities.

In 2008, he appointed strategic advisor and local activist David Ha'ivri to head the Shomron Liaison Office as part of an overall effort to improve the public image of the Jewish settlements in the region. Tours for elected officials and journalists are part of this ongoing public relations effort.

In 2013, police began investigating a company, The Central Company for the Development of Samaria, which is involved in developing West Bank settlements, and where Mesika was chairman of the board. The police acted on suspicions of bribery, embezzlement and tax fraud of over NIS 10 million over the previous 5-year period. The company is co-owned by the Shomron Regional Council, which governs many settlements in the West Bank, and by settlement association coops. The firm is involved in construction and also runs a line of bullet-proof buses.

At the end of 2014, Mesika was initially arrested, then eight days later released to house arrest in his home in Elon Moreh, as part of a wide-ranging police investigation into corruption. As part of the arrangement, he is forbidden to leave Israel for a 90-day period. He is prohibited from entering the Shomron Regional Council for 30 days, and from entering the Company for Development of Samaria for 60 days.

On 22 November 2015 he drove his car into a 16 year old Palestinian girl near the Hawara army checkpoint. She was reported to have been about to attack a settler with a knife. A soldier and a civilian then shot the girl dead.

In 2019 Mesika founded the law firm Barak, Mesika & Kaikov, along with Adv. Hillel Barak and Meir Kaikov.
