= Kadim =

Israeli settlement in the West Bank

Coordinates: 32°26′57″N 35°19′12″E

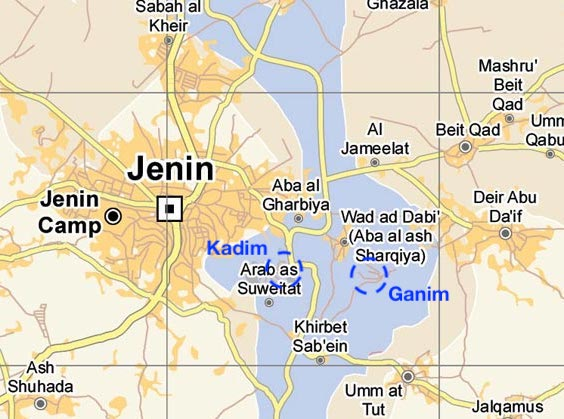
Kadim and Ganim on the 2018 OCHA OpT map of Jenin

Kadim (Hebrew: כדים) is an Israeli settlement on a hilltop in the northern West Bank, just east of the large Palestinian city of Jenin, under the administrative jurisdiction of Shomron Regional Council. The international community considers Israeli settlements in the West Bank illegal under international law, but the Israeli government disputes this.

== History ==
The settlement, close to Jenin, attracted secular young Israeli families seeking low cost housing and an idyllic lifestyle. During the Second Intifada, Palestinian snipers used the hilltop outside the perimeter fence to aim into the windows of Kadim homes. In the face of mounting violence, many residents left.

During seven years of talks that ended in 2001, the possibility of dismantling Kadim was discussed as part of a peace agreement.

In September 2005, Ariel Sharon's plan for unilateral disengagement was implemented and the remaining residents of Kadim were evicted.

On 11 December 2025, the Security Cabinet of Israel approved the reestablishment of Kadim as part of a decision to establish 19 new settlements.

In August 2026, prefabricated homes were moved into Kadim in preparation for the repopulation of the settlement. The head of the Shomron Regional Council Yossi Dagan stated that these homes would be "the beginning of a large settlement". The opening ceremony was attended by Dagan and the Minister of Finance Bezalel Smotrich. The reestablishment of Kadim is part of an expansion of settlements in the region, the Israeli government has approved over one hundred settlements since December 2022.

== See also ==
- Ganim
- Sa-Nur
- Homesh
- List of villages depopulated during the Arab–Israeli conflict
