= Draft United Nations resolution on Israeli settlements, 2011 =

The draft United Nations resolution on Israeli settlements placed before the United Nations Security Council proposed that all Israeli settlements established in the occupied Palestinian territories after 1967 be condemned, and urged that Israel and the Palestinian Authority comply with their obligations under the Road Map plan in order to establish a two-state solution. The resolution failed to pass after the United States exercised its right to veto on February 18, 2011. The other 14 members of the council voted in favour of the resolution.

== Background ==
The peace process was revitalized in September 2010, with direct talks between Israel and the Palestinian Authority, with the U.S. supporting the negotiations. With little headway made, the Palestinian National Authority decided to present a draft resolution to the Security Council, resisting strong pressure from both United States President Barack Obama and Secretary of State Hillary Clinton.

A month into the discussions a roadblock was hit when a 10-month settlement construction freeze was allowed to expire on September 26. On October 2, Mahmoud Abbas announced that peace negotiations will not continue until settlement construction is once again stopped.

== UN Security Council vote ==
The resolution was sponsored by over 120 of the UN's 192 members states. The U.S. attempted several times to persuade Palestine to rescind the resolution or accept a non-binding resolution instead. Palestine refused and brought the resolution to the Security Council. The final vote was 14 for and the U.S., whose vote holds veto power, alone was against it. The United States, in voting against a resolution that would have condemned Israeli settlements as illegal, argued that while settlement activity violated international legality, the resolution, if passed, would only harden the positions of both sides, complicate stalled negotiations and hinder future talks. Over 120 U.N. member states supported the resolution. This was the first U.N. veto used by the Obama administration. A spokesman for Mahmoud Abbas commented that the US veto allowed Israel to escape its obligations. Israel's Foreign Ministry expressed its appreciation for the US position, and expressed regret that the other Security Council members had refrained from making the same contribution.

== International response ==
United Kingdom France Germany
Britain, France and Germany put out a joint statement in which they explained they had voted for the resolution "because our views on settlements, including east Jerusalem, are clear: they are illegal under international law, an obstacle to peace, and constitute a threat to a two-state solution. All settlement activity, including in east Jerusalem, should cease immediately."
US
Ambassador Susan E. Rice, explained her veto of the resolution as "this draft resolution risks hardening the positions of both sides. It could encourage the parties to stay out of negotiations", she made note that the U.S. did not support Israeli settlements but that "[W]e reject in the strongest terms the legitimacy of continued Israeli settlement activity,...Continued settlement activity violates Israel's international commitments, devastates trust between the parties, and threatens the prospects for peace…"
State of Palestine
Mahmoud Abbas, President of the Palestinian National Authority, stated "We only want to protect our interest and our rights as guaranteed in international law", he also stated that "We are not seeking to break from the U.S. administration and it is not in our interest to do that" Hamas spokesperson Fawzi Barhoum, said that "The veto reveals the reality of the clear US support to what the Zionist enemy does against our people". Riyad Mansour, Palestine's permanent observer to the U.N., stated that "Our overarching goal remains to bring an end to the Israeli colonization and occupation of our land and its destruction of the two-State solution...We fear, however, that the message sent today may be one that only encourages further Israeli intransigence and impunity."
Israel
Prime Minister Benjamin Netanyahu's office replied to the veto that "Israel deeply appreciates the decision by President Obama to veto the Security Council Resolution" Ibrahim Sarsur, an Arab member of the Israeli Knesset responded that "Obama cannot be trusted. We knew his promises were lies. The time has come to spit in the face of the Americans." Israeli ambassador to the U.N., Meron Reuben, stated that "the resolution before you should never have been submitted,... Instead, the international community and the Security Council should have called upon the Palestinian leadership, in a clear and resolute voice, to immediately return to the negotiating table."
Egypt
The Egyptian Foreign Ministry commented that "The veto, which contradicts the American public stance rejecting settlement policy, will lead to more damage to the United States' credibility on the Arab side as a mediator in peace efforts,"
United Nations Secretary-General Ban Ki-moon did not voice an opinion on the vote outcome, instead stating "The international community agrees on the urgent need for a negotiated settlement that will end the occupation that started in 1967 and establish an independent, democratic and viable Palestinian State living side by side in peace and security with Israel. We must do all we can to help the parties move forward."
Organisation of the Islamic Conference
The organisation which represents 57nations responded by stating that "[The veto] is a devastating blow to the credibility of international efforts to resume the peace process"
Middle East Human Rights Watch director Sarah Leah Whitson
released the statement, "President Obama wants to tell the Arab world in his speeches that he opposes settlements, but he won't let the Security Council tell Israel to stop them in a legally binding way,"
Tawfik Tirawi
a member of Fatah's Central Committee, called upon Palestinians to hold a 'day of rage' the following Friday to protest the American vetoing of the resolution.

A protest was held outside the U.S. embassy in Tel Aviv, Israel, the day following the vote, with approximately 50 people attending it. One protester was reported to have stated the protest was part of "a new campaign pointing a finger at the US complicity in Israeli crimes." The following Sunday, approximately 3000 Palestinians gather in Ramallah to protest the veto.

== See also ==
- List of United Nations resolutions concerning Palestine
