= Yossi Dagan =

Israeli politician and activist settler

- יוסי דגן
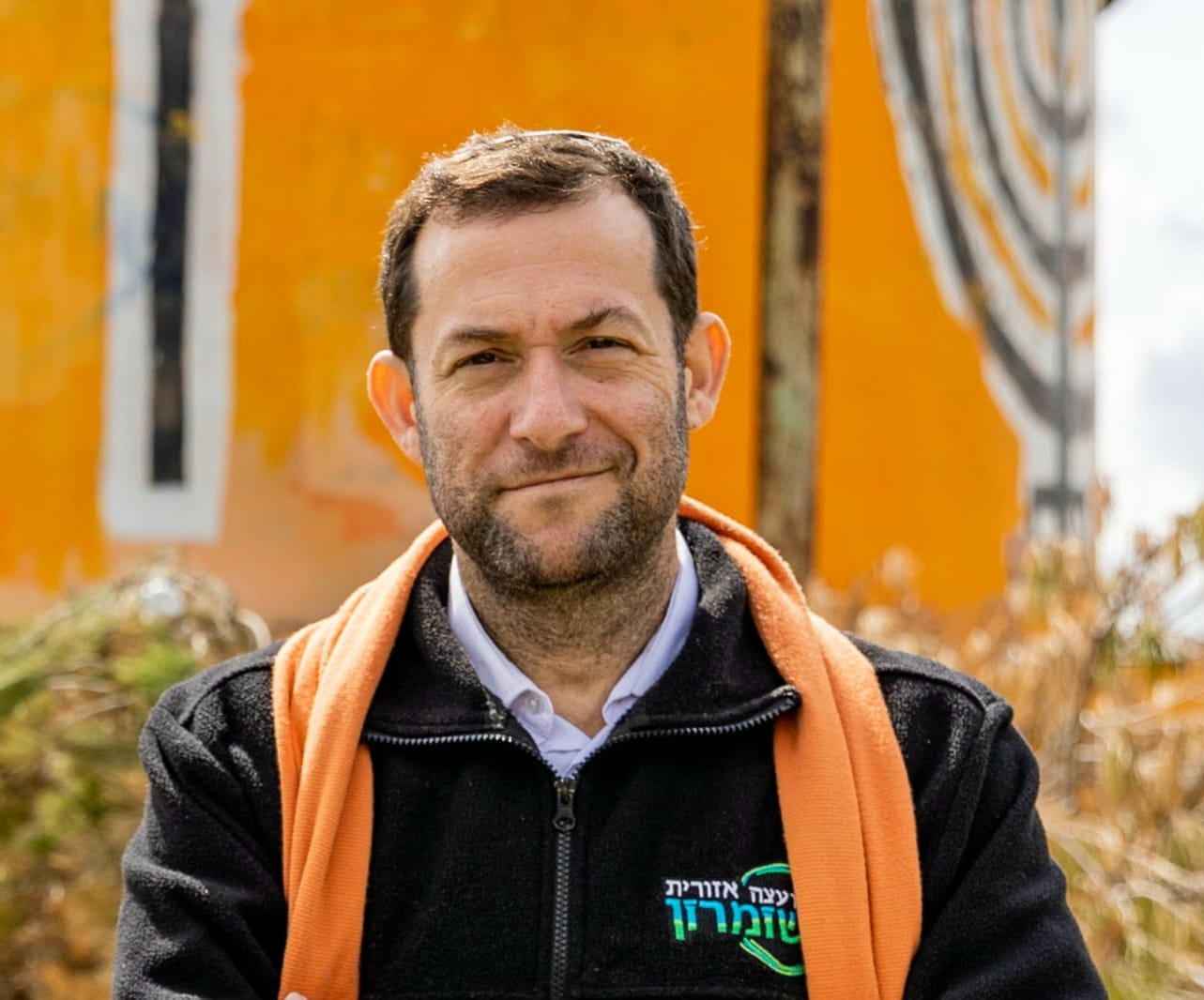

6th Chairman of the Shomron Regional Council
- Incumbent
- Assumed office 2015
- Preceded by: Gershon Mesika

Personal details
- Born: Yosef Solomon Dagan
- Citizenship: Israel
- Party: Likud
- Other political affiliations: Moledet
- Education: Bnei Akiva
- Alma mater: Ono Academic College, Bar-Ilan University
- Occupation: Politician
- Profession: Lawyer

Military service
- Allegiance: Israel
- Rank: Lieutenant

Yossi Dagan (Hebrew: יוסי דגן) is an Israeli activist and politician who has been the head of the Shomron Regional Council since August 2015.

Dagan grew up in the Israeli city of Bnei Brak in the Pardes Katz neighborhood. When he was in the tenth grade, he moved with his parents and siblings to Shavei Shomron. Dagan was a counselor in the Bnei Akiva youth movement, and later joined the youth division of the Moledet party, of which he eventually became the leader. In this function, he enjoyed a close personal relationship with the party's leader, Rehavam Ze'evi. Dagan is a graduate of the first class of the Darkei Noam Yeshiva, and then continued his studies at the Shavei Shomron Yeshiva and Yeshivat Nir in Kiryat Arba.

Dagan is a leader of Homesh First, a grassroots organization dedicated to re-settling and re-building Homesh. Homesh First was formed after the homes of the Jewish residents of Homesh were razed and the Jewish community was evicted as part of Israel's disengagement in August 2005. Dagan himself was a resident of Sa-Nur, which was also demolished and evacuated as part of the 2005 disengagement plan. He is married, and father to four small children. He lives in Shavei Shomron, an Israeli settlement in the northern West Bank. He has a bachelor's degree in law from the Ono Academic College and a master's degree in law from Bar-Ilan University, and is an accredited mediator.

He served as an officer in the Israel Defense Forces, where he holds the rank of captain in the reserve forces.

In August 2015, Dagan was elected as Head of the Shomron Regional Council, replacing Gershon Mesika, who resigned from his post following a corruption scandal in the Yisrael Beiteinu political party. He received the support of 63% of the voters in general elections that were held for the Shomron Regional Municipal government on Aug. 6, 2015.

In June 2023, a Palestinian Authority policeman was arrested at Tulkarm Camp with charges of a connection to an assassination plot against Dagan. The man had been located after a four-month manhunt, and had previously hidden in a police station in Jericho.

== Sa-Nur and the Disengagement Period ==
Following his military service, Dagan established a nucleus of religious families that joined the Sa-Nur Jewish community, that was subsequently destroyed in the course of Israel's 2005 Disengagement Plan. Sa-Nur had originally been established as an artist's village, and most of its residents were artists who had made Aliyah to Israel from the former Soviet Union. During the Second Intifada, which broke out in 2000 and continued through 2005, the Jewish community grew weaker, losing some of its residents. In response, together with his friend Ariel Perel, Dagan organized and led a group of religious families to come to live in the Jewish community, thereby bolstering the number of residents for many years to come and helping to reinvigorate Sa-Nur. Some of Dagan's and Perel's time in Sa-Nur was marked by extremely difficult security conditions, including persistent attacks by gunmen and attempted terrorist attacks.

Despite these hardships, they succeeded in breathing new life into the Jewish community, and dozens of new families came to live there. As a result of this influx, a kindergarten, a day care center, and a new grocery store were built, and the art gallery was reopened. Tens of thousands of people came to visit the Jewish community, as Sa-Nur became a stepping stone for visiting the entire Northern Shomron region.

At the same time, Dagan and a group of friends, among them Shuli Har Melech, were active in attempting to bolster the religious community that had joined the Jewish community of Homesh. Together, they established an agricultural yeshiva to further reinforce the community. As Shuli Har Melech and his wife were driving home from Har Melech's parents' house to their home in Homesh, the car was attacked by terrorists and Shuli was murdered, just a short time after a phone conversation with Dagan.

Dagan became one of the leaders of the struggle against Prime Minister Ariel Sharon's Disengagement Program first proposed in 2003, that focused on ending the Israeli presence in the Gush Katif Jewish communities as well as in four Jewish communities in the Northern Shomron region. Because of the controversial nature of the disengagement plan, the Likud conducted a party referendum on it among Likud voters in 2004. Dagan served as deputy director of the "rebel faction" in the party that opposed the disengagement, and played an instrumental role in this faction's sweeping victory in the referendum. When Sharon decided to implement the disengagement plan, despite the results of the referendum, Dagan led the struggle against the uprooting of Jewish communities in the Northern Shomron region. He continued his resistance until the final evacuation, during which he barricaded himself on the roof of an ancient fortress, together with his fellow residents in Sa-Nur, and figures such as Rabbi Dov Lior, Member of Knesset, Professor Aryeh Eldad, the former Member of Knesset Elyakim Haetzni, Member of Knesset Yehiel Hazan, and various religious leaders. The people who barricaded themselves in Sa-Nur and neighboring Homesh were the last to be evacuated in the disengagement.

== "Homesh First" and the struggle to return to the Jewish communities ==
After the 2006 Lebanon War, Dagan and a group of activists who had served in reserve units during the war, and had been evacuated from the Northern Shomron region, created the "Homesh First" organization. This organization sought to reestablish Jewish communities that had been uprooted from the Northern Shomron region, as the area remained under full Israeli control (Area C).

Homesh First was composed of a core group of over 40 families from Homesh and Sa-Nur, supported by 11 right-wing extra-parliamentary groups. The organization staged mass protest marches to Homesh, defying the prohibition to return to evicted Jewish communities. During the Chanukah holiday in 2006, some 1,000 people took part in such a march. In Passover, 2007, more than 5,000 people participated, and succeeded in inhabiting the remains of the Jewish community for three days until they were forcibly removed. On Independence Day of the same year, 15,000 people marched to Homesh, with Dagan and Nobel Laureate Professor Yisrael (Robert) Aumann at the head of the protest. In the summer, thousands came to Homesh to mark two years since its evacuation. Since then, a yeshiva has been founded among the remains of the Jewish community, and many public events take place there, and are attended by thousands, including the former Speaker of the Knesset, Yuli (Yoel) Edelstein, government ministers, and dozens of Knesset members.

As head of the Shomron Regional Council, Dagan continues to lead the call to return to the evacuated Jewish communities, promoting the subject in mass rallies, parliamentary work, and articles. Among other things, he has published an article concerning a tree he planted in Sa-Nur before the evacuation, which he continues to tend to as a sign of hope for the reestablishment of all of the evicted Northern Shomron Jewish communities.

In 2008 Dagan was one of the founders of the "Samaria Residents Committee". Dagan has been a member of the Likud Central Committee since 2012.

== Shomron Regional Council ==
In 2007, Dagan was elected as a member of the General Assembly of the Shomron Regional Council, representing Shavei Shomron. In 2008, he was appointed as the advisor to the Head of the Council at that time, Gershon Mesika, and served as the Director of the council's Strategic Department.

Dagan, who coined the phrase "the Jewish community movement's greatest enemy is ignorance," established the Shomron strategic information service that targeted both the Israeli and the foreign public. As part of this activity, he established VIP tours to the Shomron, bringing more than 1,500 Israeli public opinion-makers to the region, among them important journalists, such as Avri Gilad, Menachem Ben, and Guy Zohar. Following his participation in the tour, Avri Gilad announced on his radio program on the station Galei Tzahal that he had undergone a "paradigm shift" concerning the Jewish communities . The same experience led Menachem Ben to look into relocating to the Nofim Jewish community in the Shomron. Following his tour, journalist Guy Zohar stated that there was no possibility of creating a Palestinian state. These statements were echoed by many other public figures who participated in the tours. The project was considered groundbreaking, and has been credited with effecting a shift in Israeli public opinion concerning the Jewish communities in the West Bank. Dagan also founded the Shomron tourist initiative “Shomron- Nice to Meet You” (Shomron, Na’im Lehakir), which has facilitated visits to the region of more than half a million sightseers, and the Mishkefet organization that has brought tens of thousands of hikers to the area.

In the 2012 municipal elections, Dagan was elected Deputy Head of the Regional Council, and was given responsibility for education, community centers, residents’ services, and public relations.

== Head of the Shomron Regional Council ==
After Gershon Mesika resigned his post as Head of the Regional Council following a corruption scandal in the Yisrael Beiteinu political party, Dagan was appointed his successor. In special elections held in 2015, Dagan was officially elected to the position, defeating his rival, Sraya Demski from the Jewish community of Elon Moreh, by a large margin of 63.1%. In the 2018 elections, Mesika withdrew from the race following a mediation conducted between him and Dagan by Rabbi Shmuel Eliyahu. Dagan ran against Paul Golovanevsky, and was elected for a second term in office by an overwhelming majority of 81.19% (13,148 ballots).

== Activities in the Likud ==
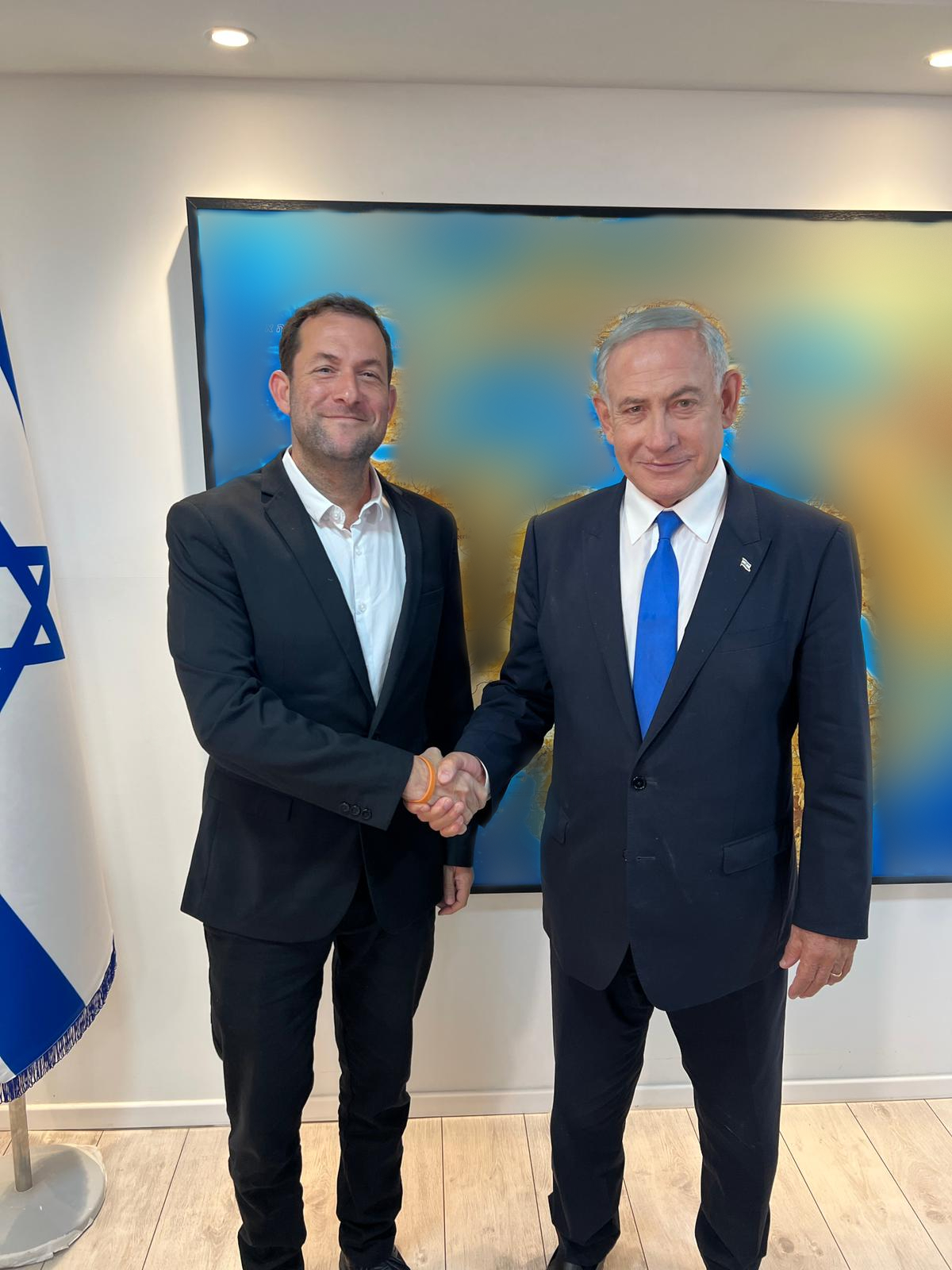
Yossi Dagan meets with Israeli Prime Minister Benjamin Netanyahu

Together with his friends Yoni HaYisraeli and Yaakov Weinberger, Dagan established a lobby of Likud voters, “My Likud – A Pro-Jewish community Lobby in the Likud,” that attracted thousands of Likud voters, and is today the second largest group inside the party. Dagan is considered a key figure on the Israeli right, and has played crucial roles in political campaigns, including serving as a mediator between Prime Minister Netanyahu and Avigdor Lieberman in 2016. His efforts resulted in Lieberman joining the government, thereby blocking the entrance of the Labor Party, then led by Isaac Herzog and Tzipi Livni.

Despite protesting against Netanyahu on various occasions, Dagan is considered to have influence with Netanyahu, who attended three large events in the Shomron over a period of two years: the ceremony marking 50 years since the liberation of the Shomron, an event marking the 40th anniversary of the Shomron Regional Council and the ceremony for the inauguration of the Nabi Ilyas bypass.

== Foreign Relations and Information Services ==
Reflecting his worldview, according to which “the Jewish community movement’s greatest enemy is ignorance,” Dagan established foreign relations and information services for the Shomron Region, as well as lobbies and friendship groups for the region in various parliaments and communities around the world.

As part of this effort, Dagan established an official lobby for Israeli settlements in the West Bank in the European Parliament, and was party to the formation of a trade lobby for Jewish-Arab trade in the West Bank. These lobbies organize meetings, tours, and conferences, as well as public events, at which figures such as the 14-year-old terror victim, Ayala Shapira, who was gravely injured in a December 2014 Molotov cocktail attack, have participated. At Dagan's initiative, Shapira was sent to address the European Parliament, and Sheikh Tamimi from Ramallah addressed an anti-BDS advocacy conference in Madrid. The Madrid conference was subject to violent protests by dozens of BDS activists, who tried to attack both Dagan and Sheikh Tamimi. Following the incident, Dagan and the members of his group were assigned security for the duration of their visit in Spain.

As part of his public relations activities, Dagan has appeared twice before conferences in the European Parliament, and a number of times before the Congressional events in Washington, D.C. He is considered to have strong contacts in the White House and strong connections with the Republican Party, particularly among Evangelist leaders. These contacts became a strategic asset when Donald Trump was elected President of the United States. Udi Segal, the political commentator at Israel's Channel 12 News, called Trump's new strategy the “Dagan Doctrine.”

Dagan took part in Trump's 2016 electoral campaign, and was active in promoting him among Israeli-Americans and Christian Evangelists, with whom he is well connected. After Trump's election, Dagan was invited as an official guest to the President's inauguration ceremony, the first Head of a Regional Council in Israel to receive such an honor.

Dagan has met with official representatives of the American administration a number of times. During 2019 and 2020, he used his political power in Israel and the United States to garner support for the Sovereignty Plan for the region. Dagan even flew to Washington during President Trump and Prime Minister Netanyahu's announcement of the “Deal of the Century,” and pressed for the enactment of sovereignty in all the Jewish communities in the West Bank, and for a joint statement that a Palestinian State would never be established in the region. During his stay in Washington, Dagan met with Netanyahu twice at the Blair House, as well as with ranking officials in the American administration.

During his time as Head of the Shomron Regional Council, for the first time in the history of the "Jewish community movement" in the West Bank, twin city alliances between the Shomron Regional Council and foreign municipal areas were signed, including agreements for financial cooperation. Cities and regions that signed such agreements include Hampstead (Five Towns) in New York, the state of Texas, the Valtellina region in Italy, and Hévíz in Hungary.

In December 2020, together with businessmen in Dubai and the fam holding company, valued at more than NIS 3 billion, he announced an economic cooperation agreement for the export of wine, honey, olive oil and tahini manufactured in West Bank settlements to the United Arab Emirates.

== Political and Public Activism ==
Dagan was active in actions of civil disobedience as a method of protesting the Disengagement Plan. Dagan helped to organize the 2007 Yom Ha'atzmaut march to Homesh. During Sukkot of the same year, Dagan organized a pilgrimage to Homesh. Many former residents and sympathetic Israelis camped out on the grounds where Homesh houses were demolished. The Christian Science Monitor quoted Dagan as warning against the disengagement: "You'll be creating a terror state that would threaten most of the country with Qassam [missiles]."

In 2013, Dagan helped to spearhead a public relations campaign focused on welcoming Israelis to the West Bank. Dagan hoped to counter what he said were "radical left-wing Israeli groups" that promote hatred against settlements in Israel and Europe.

In January 2015, he became involved in an international incident between the U.S State Department and Israel. In January 2015, Jewish settlers at the Adei Ad illegal outpost threw stones at diplomats from a U.S. delegation who had arrived to inspect vandalism reported at a grove of Palestinian-owned trees in the occupied West Bank. It was reported that recently, settlers were suspected of uprooting thousands of olive tree saplings, some of which had been planted in honor of senior Palestinian official Ziad Abu Ein, who collapsed and died after an altercation with an Israeli soldier. The American consulate came to inspect the grove because some of the land owners claim U.S. citizenship. No injuries were reported. A U.S. State Department spokesman, Jeff Rathke, said, "We can confirm a vehicle from the Consulate General was pelted with stones and confronted by a group of armed settlers today in the West Bank, near the Palestinian village of Turmus Ayya." He added that the U.S. is "deeply concerned" about the attack, and that the Israeli authorities recognize "the seriousness of the incident". A police spokeswoman said the police were investigating the incident, and no arrests had been made. The U.S. State Department has offered the Israeli authorities a videotape of the incident showing no American drew weapons. Yossi Dagan, in his role as Head of the Shomron Regional Council, urged Interior Minister Gilad Erdan to expel the American delegation, claiming they were spies.

=== Milestones ===
In 2016, Dagan acted as the mediator between Prime Minister Netanyahu and the residents of Amona in a crisis that developed around the evacuation of the Jewish community, and played a key role in the establishment of the new Jewish community Amihai.

In 2017, Dagan succeeded in thwarting the cabinet's decision to double the size of Qalqilya, a city in the Palestinian Authority near Kfar Saba. Dagan exposed the plan, which had been kept secret from the ministers and the public, on Channel 12 news, causing a political uproar, after which it was shelved.

In November 2017, Dagan led a protest by local authorities together with bereaved families whose loved ones were murdered on West Bank roads in front of the Prime Minister's House, while going on hunger strike demanding that bypass roads be improved and the security components in the West Bank improved. The protest ended with a written commitment by Prime Minister Netanyahu to allocate NIS 200 million in favor of these goals, and an additional NIS 600 million in the second round.

In 2018, in the immediate wake of the murder of Rabbi Raziel Shevach, Dagan, together with Shevach's widow, Yael Shevach, led the struggle to grant official recognition to the outpost at Havat Gilad, a demand to which the government eventually acceded.

=== Protest Tent ===
In the end of October 2017 Yossi Dagan, Head of Shomron Regional Council led a three week long protest outside of the Prime Minister's Residence in Jerusalem. The protesters demanded that the government approve with no delay funding to improve roads and security for the settlements in the region. This protest tent was established jointly by Dagan, Avi Naim, the Head of Beit Ariyeh Municipal Council, and Malachi Levinger, the mayor of Kiryat Arba. Family members of those who had lost their lives in terror attacks also took part in the establishment of this tent, among them Hadas Mizrachi, the widow of Lieutenant Colonel Baruch Mizrachi, who was murdered on Passover Eve, 2014, en route to celebrate the holiday with his family in Kiryat Arba.

During the last week they declared a hunger strike. On Friday Nov. 9, the group held a press conference on site together with MK David Bitan who represented PM Netanyahu in negotiations, they announced that their demands were accepted and that the PM had signed a letter to the effect.

Dagan and Netanyahu agreed upon an NIS 800 million building package. As a result, the paving of strategic roads could begin, including the Huwara, Al Aroub, and Al-Lubban bypasses, and the Qalandiya underpass. An additional budget of NIS 90 million was approved for roadway lighting in the West Bank.

=== Joseph's Tomb ===
Through cooperation and protection of the IDF command, the Shomron Regional Council organizes periodic visits and events at Joseph's Tomb in Nablus Shechem which in Area A under the full control of the Palestinian Authority. This area is normally of limits to Israeli and Jewish people. On such a visit in December 2017 the site was found vandalized, something that has occurred repeatedly under the PA. Yossi Dagan called on the government of Israel to retake and protect the Jewish holy place.

== The Aliyah from France ==
One of Dagan's strategic goals for the Shomron was to serve in the absorption of new immigrants. As part of an immigration absorption project, some 80 families from France found a home in Jewish communities in the region. The initiative was hailed a flagship project, and had a 100% success rate: none of the families returned to France, and all were successfully absorbed.

== See also ==
- Evacuation (Israeli politics)
- Aryeh Eldad
- David Ha'ivri
- Gershon Mesika
- Shomron Regional Council
