= Sa-Nur =

Israeli settlement in the West Bank

Coordinates: 32°20′14″N 35°12′7″E

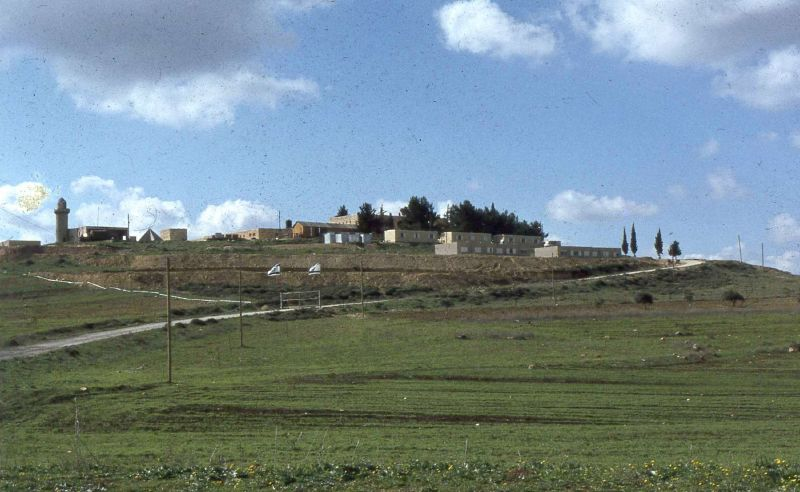
Sa-Nur, 1978

Sa-Nur (Hebrew: שא-נור, lit. 'Flame Carrier') is an Israeli settlement in the northern West Bank, just north of the Palestinian towns of Silat ad-Dhahr and Fandaqumiya, under the administrative jurisdiction of Shomron Regional Council.

This community was established in 1977 by the Gush Emunim movement and given its name after consultation with songwriter Naomi Shemer. Sa-Nur shares its name with Sanur, a nearby Palestinian community.

The international community considers Israeli settlements in the West Bank illegal under international law, but the Israeli government disputes this.

== Unilateral disengagement ==
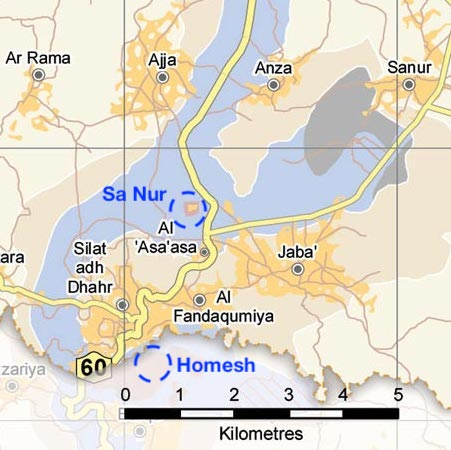
Homesh and Sa Nur on the 2018 OCHA OpT map of Jenin

In September 2005 its 105 residents were evicted and Israel Defense Forces soldiers began dismantling Sanur as part of Israeli disengagement from the Gaza Strip. Prior to its demolition, Sa-Nur was home to 43 families. The demolition of Sa-Nur and Homesh marked the end of the central part of the disengagement plan. The only remaining structure, a synagogue, was buried under mounds of sand by bulldozers to prevent its destruction by the Palestinians.

== Attempts to rebuild ==
Since the demolition, religious Zionist groups have attempted to return to Sa-Nur, in order to rebuild the community. On 8 May 2008, following a permitted Independence Day rally in Homesh, a group of 150 set off at night for Sa-Nur, including many former residents.

On 30 July 2015, marking the 10 year anniversary after the evacuation, 250 people, made up of 20 former families, attempted to resettle in Sa-Nur, before being forcibly evicted by the Israel Defense Forces.

In late July 2018, 200 Jewish settlers, supported by Bayit Yehudi MKs Shuli Mualem and Bezalel Smotrich, revisited the area as part of a plan to challenge the Disengagement Plan which led to the settlement's dismantlement.

== Reestablishment ==
In May 2025, the government's Security Cabinet approved the reestablishment of Sa-Nur, along with the formerly dismantled settlement of Homesh, as well as the establishment of 20 other new settlements. The settlement was reestablished with caravans and a military base in 2026.

In July 2026, Sa-Nur hosted its highest profile foreign visitor to date, Dutch politician Geert Wilders.

== See also ==
- Ganim
- Homesh
- Kadim
- Yossi Dagan
