= Ganim =

Israeli settlement in the West Bank

Coordinates: 32°27′0″N 35°20′16″E

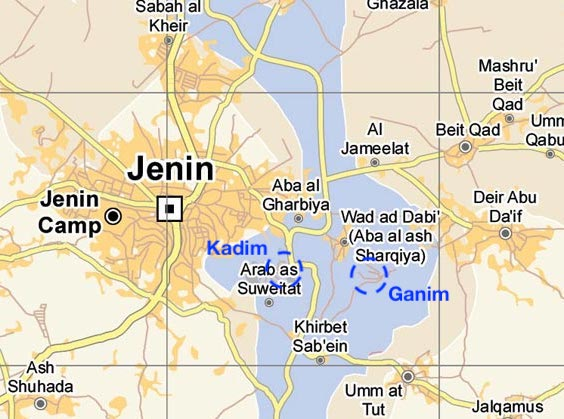
Kadim and Ganim on the 2018 OCHA OpT map of Jenin

Ganim (Hebrew: גַּנִּים) is an Israeli settlement in the northern West Bank, just east of the large Palestinian city of Jenin, under the administrative local government of the Shomron Regional Council.

The international community considers Israeli settlements in the West Bank illegal under international law, but the Israeli government disputes this.

== History ==
The settlement was founded in 1983 by members of Betar. Its name was derived from the assumed biblical name of Jenin, the nearby city, which was originally called Ein Ganim (Anem) of the Tribe of Issachar (Joshua 19:21). For this reason, Ein Ganim was also the name given to an Israeli community which today is a neighborhood of the Israeli city of Petah Tikva.

The residents of Ganim were evacuated and the synagogue was dismantled by the Israeli army as part of Israel's disengagement in 2005.

On 11 December 2025, the Security Cabinet of Israel approved the reestablishment of Ganim as part of a decision to establish 19 new settlements.

On 23 July 2026, a Palestinian Authority policeman stabbed a man in the area.

The settlement was reestablished in August 2026. In a statement marking the return of Israeli families to the settlement, Finance Minister Bezalel Smotrich said, "Samaria is ours. It is an inseparable part of the Land of Israel and the State of Israel", and added that the repopulation of Ganim had security significance for the rest of Israel.

== See also ==
- Homesh
- Kadim
- Sa-Nur
