= Homesh =

Israeli settlement in the West Bank

Homesh: חֹמֶשׁ (Hebrew); حومش (Arabic)
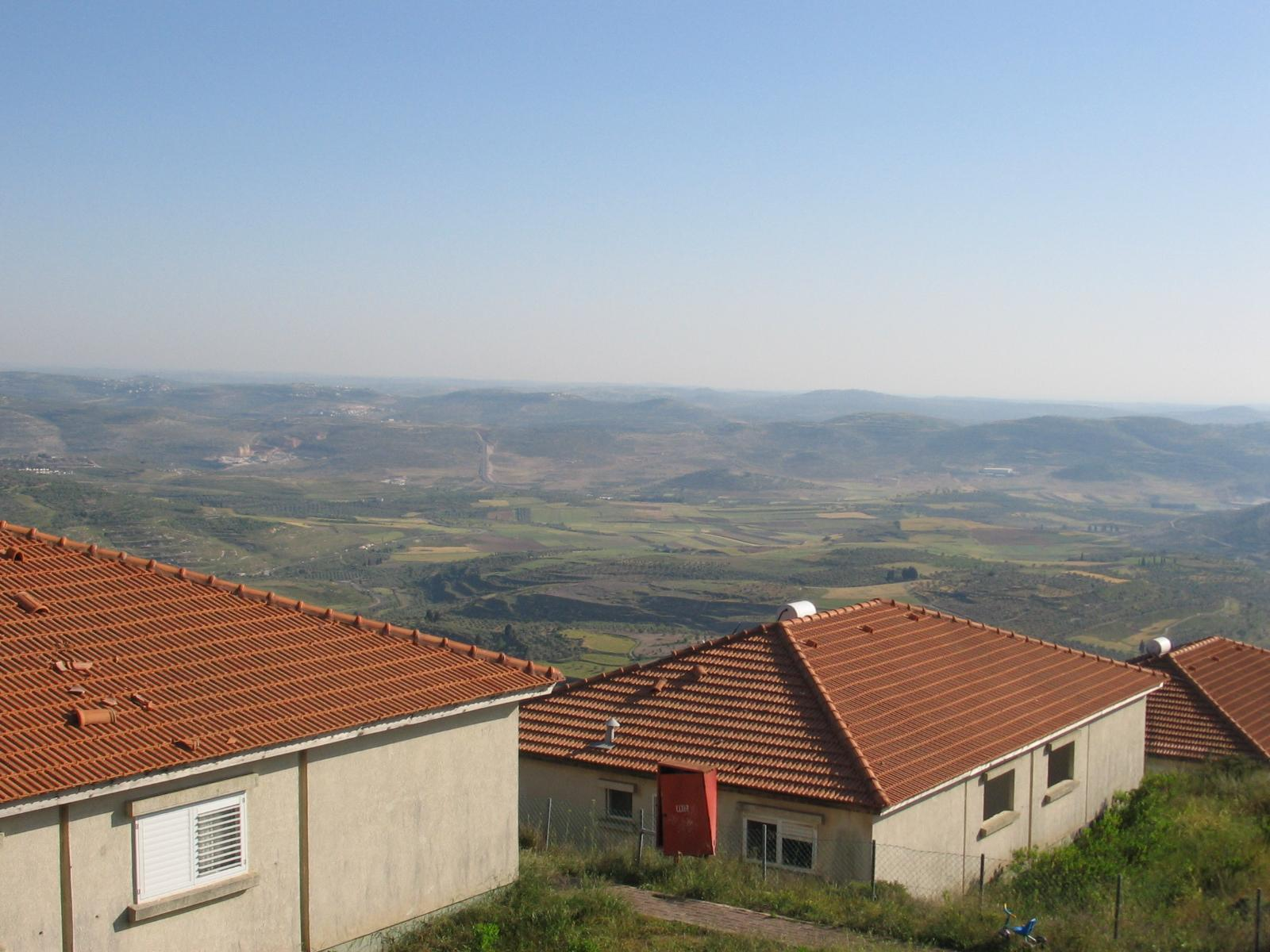
- Etymology: Named after 5 villages that were in the area during the time of the Mishnah and the Talmud.
- Location within the Northern West Bank
- Coordinates: 32°18′29″N 35°11′33″E
- Country: Israel
- District: Judea and Samaria Area
- Council: Shomron
- Region: West Bank
- Affiliation: Mishkei Herut Beitar
- Founded: 1978
- Population (2025): 20 families

Homesh (Hebrew: חֹמֶשׁ, חומש) is an Israeli settlement in the West Bank along Route 60, just south of the Palestinian towns of Silat ad-Dhahr and Fandaqumiya. The settlement is under the administrative jurisdiction of the Shomron Regional Council. In 2005, the settlement homes were demolished along with three other settlements in the northern West Bank, at the same time as the Israeli disengagement from Gaza. In 2025, the settlement was officially reestablished following Israeli government approval. It is currently home to about 20 families. The international community considers Israeli settlements in the West Bank illegal under international law, but the Israeli government disputes this.

== History ==
The village was established in 1978 on 700 dunams (70 hectares) of confiscated land belonging to Palestinian residents of the nearby village of Burqa, whose ownership was certified in the land registry. It began as a pioneer Nahal military outpost, and demilitarized when turned over to residential purposes in 1980 to secular Jews. During the Second Intifada, about half of the residents left. Shortly thereafter, dozens of Orthodox Jews moved to the village in order to show support for the continued settlement of the area.

Even after the settlement was disestablished in 2005, and even though Israel recognizes the lands where Homesh was built is privately owned by Palestinians, the Israel Defense Forces have not yet, as of January 2023, allowed the Palestinian land-owners to return to their land.

== Eviction ==
The residents of Homesh were forcefully evicted from their homes and their houses demolished as part of the Israeli disengagement from Gaza and four settlements in the northern West Bank of August 2005. Kibbutz Yad Hana accepted the government's offer to absorb settlers evicted from Homesh in the partial disengagement from the occupied territories (see Protocol N.31 of the Knesset Ombudsman sub-committee on the disengaged, 5 January 2009) and was renamed Yad Hana-Homesh.

== Movement to rebuild ==
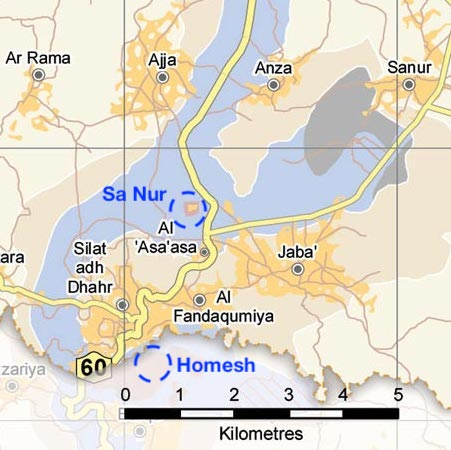
Homesh and Sa Nur on the 2018 OCHA OpT map of Jenin

In 2006 during Hanukkah, a few hundred people, including settlers and some former residents, arrived at Homesh and lit a Hanukkah 'shamash' candle. A declaration was made that this effort was the first step in rebuilding Homesh. On March 26, 2007, a few thousand supporters and former residents marched to Homesh and declared their wish to stay and rebuild. While the 'Disengagement Law' forbids Israeli citizens from being in the area, the Israeli army and police said that they allowed the march in order to avoid marchers detouring around roadblocks through Arab areas and to avoid violence such as in the evacuation of Amona. The new resettlement was demolished on March 28, 2007, by the Israel Police, border police and military police. After being evacuated the marchers said that they would try again. Another march of thousands took place on April 24, 2007, the Israeli Independence Day. Many are determined to return to their former homes. During an ascent in June 2007, the largest remaining structure in Homesh, its water tower, was painted orange, the color of the anti-disengagement movement. The color made the hilltop more visible in its surroundings, emboldening those hoping to rebuild the community.

In late July 2007, another wider effort began in the effort to renew a permanent presence on the site. Hundreds of Israelis detoured around roadblocks to reach the site. Since then, while the police make attempts to clear the site, new visitors have returned with those who had been removed.

In 2007, during Rosh Hashana, dozens of Jews were evicted and not allowed to celebrate the holiday at Homesh. Israeli police in the West Bank told the media that the terror alert necessitated the eviction of the families despite the fact that it involved desecration of the holiday. "The sensitivity to the holiday is important but after assessment sessions were held, it was decided that there was a need to operate during the holiday."

In June 2007, Knesset member Aryeh Eldad announced that he has the support of 42 Knesset members, in a bill proposing the rebuilding of Homesh, and the decriminalization of further rebuilding attempts.

Fatah military commander Abu Araj has stated that if settlers return to Homesh, the Palestinians would meet the Israeli community with, "fire and attacks. We will not let this entrance go by quietly, and just as before, we will make every effort to liberate our land all over again."

On December 16, 2021, Yehudah Dimentman, a resident of nearby Shavei Shomron who was a student at the Homesh outpost yeshiva, was killed by a Palestinian shooter, who also wounded two passengers. Following Dimentman's funeral, a march to Homesh demanded its rebuilding. On December 22, 2021, a vote in the Knesset to rebuild Homesh was defeated in a vote of 59 votes against to 50 in favor. On January 3, 2022, Defense Minister Benny Gantz ordered the dismantling of unauthorized structures on the site of Homesh.

With Israeli government approval, Israeli settlers relocated a yeshiva established on private Palestinian land to a nearby spot designated state-owned land. The relocation was carried out despite international opposition, including repeatedly from the U.S., and the opposition of the Israeli attorney general.

== Court rulings ==
In August 2007, an Israeli court ruled that it was not illegal entering the ruins of Homesh. Nevertheless, the army frequently declares the site a closed military zone and that it is illegal for civilians to be there.

Justice David Gadol ruled that the Disengagement Law, on which the state bases its prohibition on entering the ruins of Homesh was legislated is not to be utilized for different purposes after that event. The judge also ruled that the government has not relinquished Homesh to another sovereignty and that its status and access roads remain Area 'C' which is in full control of Israel and with no restrictions on Israeli traffic, "After the evacuation of Homesh, Ganim and Kadim, unlike the evacuation of the Gaza Strip settlements, as far as I know, the areas were not transferred to what is known as the Palestinian Authority. As I recall, there were pictures of Palestinians from the area looting the property that was left behind by the evacuating forces. For this reason it is important to legally define whether this territory has Area 'C' status," Justice David Gadol stated, according to Haaretz.

In 2023, the new Israeli government under Benjamin Netanyahu announced it intended to legalize the Israeli outpost illegally established at the site of the previous Homesh settlement. In reaction, Israel's Supreme Court issued an injunction against the Israeli government, urging it to dismantle the outpost, illegal under Israeli law, and to grant the Palestinian landowners of the area regular access to their land, something they have been systematically denied for years, due to the presence of the outpost and restrictions imposed by the IDF.

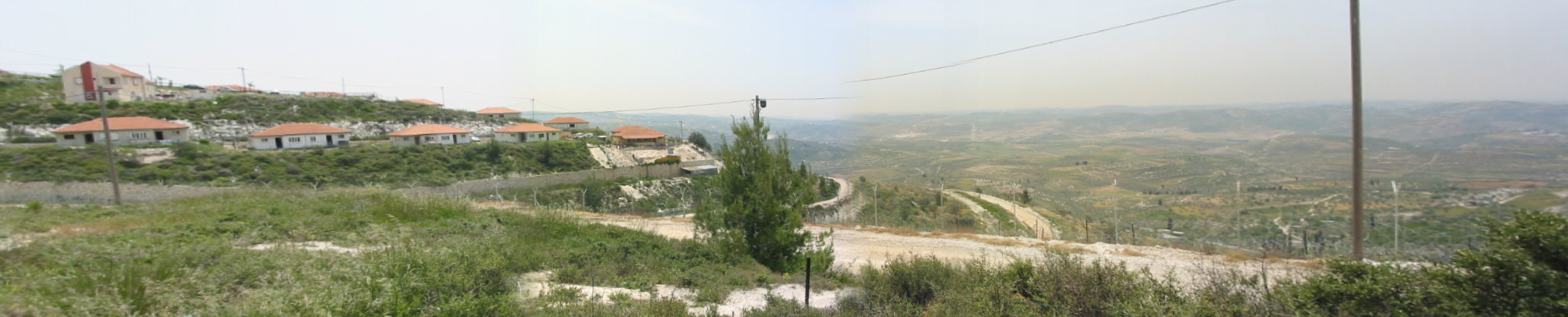
View from Homesh

== Reestablishment ==
In May 2025, the government approved the reestablishment of Homesh, along with 22 Israeli settlements in the West Bank, including the dismantled community of Sa-Nur. As of September 2025, Homesh is home to around 20 families.

On September 1, 2025, the Samaria Regional Council opened a kindergarten at Homesh. Yoav Kisch, Israel’s minister of education, and Bezalel Smotrich, the finance minister, expressed support for the opening, which was attended by council chairman Yossi Dagan.

== In popular culture ==
A documentary film called The Skies are Closer in Homesh, was made about the settlement, which, after it was dismantled by the Israeli government, became a "hot touring destination" among people who wished to express political support for the settlement movement.

== See also ==
- Ganim
- Kadim
- Sa-Nur
- Homesh First
- Yossi Dagan
