= 2018 in Israel =

- Decades: 1990s; 2000s; 2010s; 2020s
- See also: History of Israel; Timeline of Israeli history; List of years in Israel

The following lists events in the year 2018 in Israel.

== Incumbents ==
- President – Reuven Rivlin
- Prime Minister – Benjamin Netanyahu
- President of the Supreme Court – Esther Hayut
- Chief of General Staff – Gadi Eizenkot
- Government of Israel – 34th government of Israel

== Events ==
=== January ===
- 1 January - An American Jewish rabbi publishes an ad in The Washington Post calling the New Zealand pop singer Lorde a "bigot" after she cancelled her concert in Israel.
- 2 January –
  - President Donald Trump tweets that the U.S. may withhold future payments to the Palestinian authority, over 350 million dollars per year, because they are "no longer willing to talk peace" with Israel, and that Israel "would have had to pay more" in return for his recognition of Jerusalem as Israel's capital.
  - Israel announces plans to deport African migrants who reside in the country illegally, with 90 days given to either leave the country or face imprisonment.
- 7 January - The Iranian Revolutionary Guards accuse the "Zionist regime of Israel" of inciting the unrest of last week's unrest.
- 9 January - Rabbi Raziel Shevah is killed in a drive by shooting in Havat Gilad, West Bank.
- 11 January - Two 16-year-old Palestinians are shot and killed in separate clashes with the Israeli army.
- 14 January - The Israel Defense Forces announces the complete destruction of an underground tunnel dug by Hamas under the Kerem Shalom crossing. Israel shut down the crossing before its jets bombed the tunnel opening in Gaza Saturday night. The crossing remains closed.
- 15 January - Nabil Shaath, the foreign affairs adviser of Palestinian President Mahmoud Abbas, says that the Palestinian Central Council freezes its recognition of the state of Israel until Israel recognizes Palestine as a state. Palestine will freeze the Oslo accords.
- 21 January - King Abdullah II of Jordan tells U.S. Vice President Mike Pence the U.S. has to rebuild "trust and confidence" to achieve a two-state solution in Israel after the U.S. recognized Jerusalem as Israel's capital.
- 22 January - In a meeting with the President of the State of Palestine Mahmoud Abbas, High Representative of the Union for Foreign Affairs and Security Policy Federica Mogherini assures President Abbas that the European Union supports his ambition to have East Jerusalem as capital of a Palestinian state.
- 25 January - U.S. President Donald Trump threatens to stop aid to Palestine if they do not agree to partake in with Israeli peace talks.

=== February ===
- 1 February - The Palestine Liberation Organization "rejects and condemns" the United States decision to put Hamas leader Ismael Haniyeh on the OFAC SDN terror blacklist.
- 4 January -
  - The Cabinet of Israel decides to legalize a previously unauthorized outpost "deep inside the [occupied] West Bank", Havat Gilad, allegedly in reaction to the recent killing of Israeli rabbi Raziel Shevah, a 35-year-old father of six on January 9 in a drive by shooting.
  - Israeli authorities tear down parts of a European Union-funded school in the Palestinian village of Abu Nuwar, on the occupied West Bank, saying it was built illegally. Palestinians say this is the fifth such demolition since 2016, with residents and NGO's each time reconstructing it.
- 5 February – Itamar Ben Gal, an Israeli rabbi is stabbed to death by an Israeli Arab near Ariel, West Bank.
- 6 February – Polish President Andrzej Duda ratifies a controversial Holocaust bill, despite angry protests from Israel and the United States. Duda defends the legislation, which will make it illegal to accuse the Polish state of complicity in the Holocaust during the Nazi occupation.
- 9–25 February – Israel at the 2018 Winter Olympics
- 10 February – An Israeli F16 is shot down by the Syrian air defenses after conducting an air raid on Iran-backed positions inside Syrian territory.

=== March ===
- 2 March – An Israel Police anti-corruption unit questions Prime Minister Benjamin Netanyahu and his wife Sara.
- 3 March – Gazan officials say Israeli soldiers killed a Palestinian farmer on his own land in the Gaza Strip. An Israeli military spokesperson said that he got too close to the border fence.
- 18 March – Secretary-General of the Arab League Ahmed Aboul Gheit demands Guatemala reverse its decision to move its embassy from Tel Aviv to Jerusalem. The Minister of Foreign Affairs of Guatemala, Sandra Jovel says the move is "irreversible."
- 20 March –
  - Palestinian leader Mahmoud Abbas insults U.S. Ambassador to Israel David M. Friedman, calling him a "son of a dog" when he says Israeli settlers build on their land in the occupied West Bank. The U.S. warns Abbas to "choose between hate and peace".
  - Palestinians hold a mass demonstration in Gaza Strip, ahead of the planned moving of the U.S. Embassy.
- 30 March – Start of the 2018–2019 Gaza border protests
- 31 March –
  - Palestinian Authority President Mahmoud Abbas accuses Israel of responsibility for the deaths of 16 protestors at the border with Gaza. Israel accuses Palestinian terrorists of using civilians as human shields. A video begins circulating on social media appearing to show an unarmed teenager being shot. (Bloomberg)
  - Israel claims to have identified ten of the dead as members of terrorist organisations, and publishes a list of their names and the groups Israel says they belonged to.

=== April ===
- 1 April –
  - The Israeli Government rejects calls for an inquiry, with Prime Minister Benjamin Netanyahu likening criticism by Turkish President Recep Tayyip Erdogan to an April Fool's Day joke.
  - 23 Israeli tourists injured in a bus crash in Slanic Prahova, Romania.
- 3 April –
  - Israeli forces fatally shoot eighteen Palestinians at Gaza border.
  - Israeli Defence Minister Avigdor Liberman says the nation will maintain its tactics at the Gazan border of shooting anybody who approaches the fence, and calls on Hamas to cease hostilities in exchange for aid.
  - Human Rights Watch claims there was no evidence of any threat to Israeli soldiers and calls the killings 'unlawful' and 'calculated'.
  - Hamas claims Israeli forces fatally shoot a 25-year-old man at the border fence near Bureij.
- 26 April – Ten military cadets from a cadet academy die after being carried off by a surge in the Tzafit stream west of the Dead Sea amid floodings caused by intense storms that strike southern Israel.
- 30 April – Israeli Prime Minister Benjamin Netanyahu accuses Iran of not holding up its end of the nuclear deal with the P5+1 countries after presenting a cache over 100,000 documents detailing the extent of Iran's nuclear program. Iran denounced Netanyahu's presentation as "propaganda". Shortly after President Trump withdrew the United States from the Joint Comprehensive Plan of Action.

=== May ===
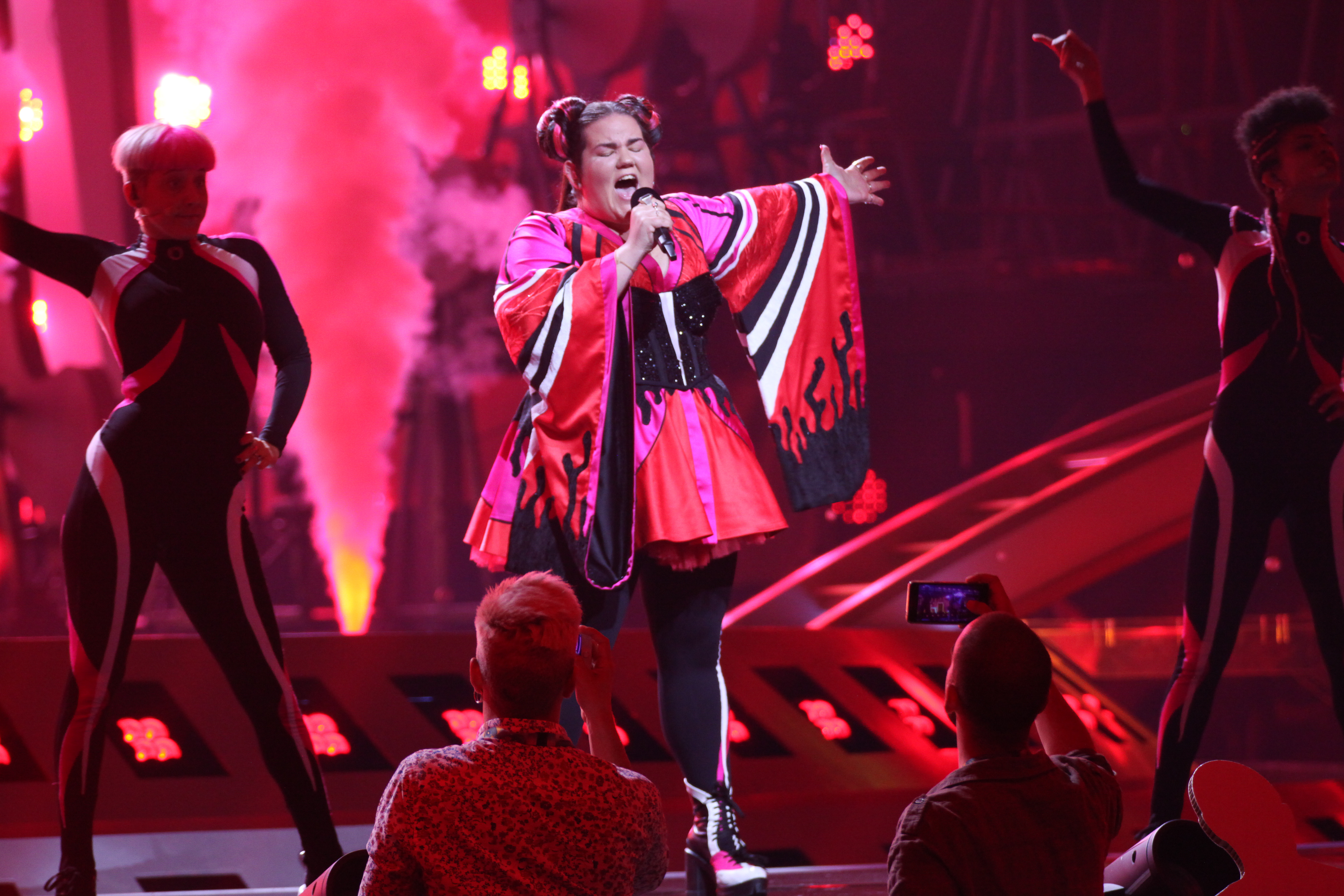
12 May: Netta Barzilai performs the song Toy, which wins the Eurovision Song Contest.

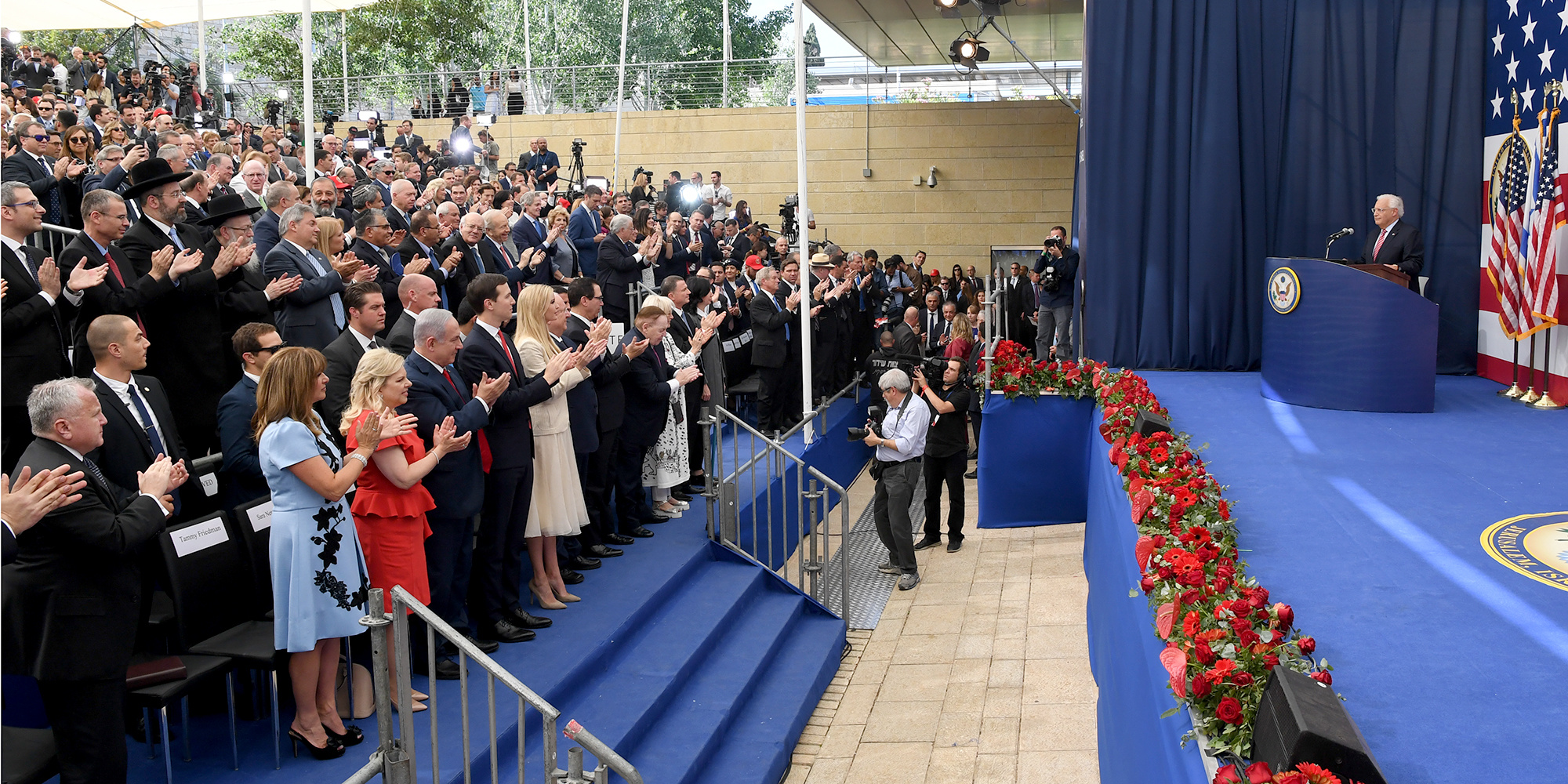
14 May: The Embassy of the United States is opened in Jerusalem.

- 1 May – Palestinian Islamic Jihad releases video of Israeli general Yoav Mordechai meeting with United Kingdom ambassador David Quarrey and observing the protests last week. Quarrey's visit came amid concerns of the Israeli Defence Forces using live ammunition and was intended to be kept secret.
- 2 May – A fire started by an incendiary device attached to a kite by Palestinian protestors and flown into Israel burns for six hours. It is the largest fire so far after a string of firebombing attacks.
- 3 May –
  - A Palestinian man was arrested by Israeli Defence Forces while attempting to damage the security fence around the northern Gaza Strip. He was shot and injured during the arrest, and received medical treatment at Soroka Medical Center.
  - Palestinian teenager Anas Abu Asr dies of wounds sustained when he was shot during protests near Gaza City last Friday, bringing the death toll to 40.
  - The Israeli High Court rules the protests to be a state of war and that human rights are therefore not applicable.
- 5 May –
  - An explosion in Deir al-Balah, Gaza, kills six Palestinians. Hamas and the Israel Defense Forces both deny responsibility and blame each other for the blast.
  - The Israeli Air Force used a "hotline" to issue an urgent warning to Khemeymim Airbase in Syria when a Russian fighter jet strayed close to Israeli airspace near the Golan Heights, due to a similar incident last year when a Syrian warplane was shot down in a similar incident.
- 4–27 May – 2018 Giro d'Italia cycling Grand Tour begins in Jerusalem.
- 10 May – Iran's Quds Force on the Syrian-held side of the Golan Heights fired around 20 projectiles towards Israeli army positions without causing damages or injuries. In response, Israel launched an extensive strike against Iranian targets in Syria.
- 12 May – Netta Barzilai wins first place for Israel at the Eurovision Song Contest with her song "Toy".
- 14 May – The new embassy of the United States opens in Jerusalem.
- 23 May – The Knesset passed a law allowing the Security Cabinet to declare war.

=== June ===
- June 2 – The funeral of Gazan medic Razan al-Najjar, draws thousands of Palestinians, with witnesses claiming that Razan was killed while trying to evacuate a wounded protester lying on the Israeli side of the fence.
- June 8 – Four killed and over 600 injured on Quds Day of thousands of Palestinians protesting near the Gaza border fence by Israeli troops firing live rounds and tear gas.
- June 18 –
  - Israel charges former energy minister Gonen Segev with spying for Iran. Segev is in custody; he was extradited from Equatorial Guinea.
  - A Palestinian man is killed tampering with and detonating an automated Gaza border defence.
- June 21 – Sara Netanyahu, wife of Prime Minister Benjamin Netanyahu, was charged for an alleged fraud.
- June 24 – Shin Bet and Israeli Defence Forces detain eight suspected terrorists, including one suspected of conducting a vehicle-ramming attack earlier in the day. Guns, cash, and stun grenades are seized.
- June 25 –
  - Greek offshore gas extraction firm Energean, which is already developing gas fields off Israel, is revealed to be contemplating an initial public offering to raise US$1.5 billion in order to develop Gaza Marine, a gas deposit off Gaza. Shell, who own a 55% stake in Gaza Marine, have been attempting to sell their share as ongoing conflict prevents production.
  - Prince William began a trip to Israel and the Palestinian territories, becoming the first British royal to visit the country in an official capacity.
- June 26 –
  - Syrian state media reports two Israeli missiles struck targets near Damascus International Airport overnight, including an Iranian cargo plane which had just landed.
  - The Israeli Air Force strikes vehicles it claims were being used to launch incendiary balloons from over the Gaza border into Israel.
  - Israeli Prime Minister Benjamin Netanyahu discusses the conflict with Gaza with the United Nations Special Coordinator to the Middle East Peace Process, Nickolay Mladenov, who has been preparing humanitarian projects for Gaza.
  - An Israeli official says that the nation has asked Cyprus to consider allowing Israel to set up a shipping point on the island for goods destined for Gaza.
  - The Palestinian Authority rejects proposals from Israel and the United States to reduce sanctions that the PA has imposed on Hamas-controlled Gaza. The PA says that there is a "conspiracy" afoot to create a "humanitarian issue" out of the disagreements.

=== July ===
- July 4 – Clashes break out between Israeli security forces and Bedouin residents in Khan al-Ahmar, West Bank, as Israeli bulldozers prepare to demolish the village, and the Supreme Court of Israel justifies the ruling of teh May 24 resident eviction, with the relocation condemned illegal under international humanitarian law.
- July 12 – Start of the 2018 World Lacrosse Championship in Netanya
- July 15 – Declassified files from Iranian nuclear documents stolen by Israeli spies reveal that Tehran obtained weapons-design information from a foreign source and was on the cusp of mastering key bombmaking technologies when the research was ordered halted 15 years ago.
- July 17 – Israeli Defense Forces announce preparation of a large-scale military offensive against Gaza if demands for Hamas to halt the launches of flaming kites, incendiary devices and rocket attacks are not met by Friday.
- July 18 – The Syrian warplanes attacks an Israeli aircraft and thwarts an Israeli missile strike on the Tiyas Military Airbase (T-4 Airbase) in the Homs Governorate.
- July 19 – Israel incorporated in its basic laws a declaration of the country as the "nation-state of the Jewish people."
- July 20 –
  - Four Hamas members are killed in a gunfight with Israeli Defense Forces engaging with al-Qassam Brigades after an Israeli soldier is killed by a Palestinian sniper; with Israeli retaliatory strikes on Hamas targets across Gaza.
  - Three rockets are fired at Israeli communities from Gaza. Two of them are intercepted by the Iron Dome.
- July 21 – Israeli Defense Forces extradites 98 White Helmets and 324 others from recently recaptured southwestern Syrian territory into Jordan, at the request of Canada and the United States. Canada, the United Kingdom and Germany offer refuge to some of them. Two other groups intended for rescue, comprising about 800 people, do not escape.
- July 24 – Israeli Air Force shoots down a Syrian Air Force warplane near the Golan Heights after it reportedly crosses into the UNDOF zone near the Israeli border.
- July 28 – Israeli Arab MP Zouheir Bahloul resigns over the "nation-state" law.
- July 29 – Palestinian teenager Ahed Tamimi is released from an Israeli prison.

=== August ===
- August 9 –
  - Seven Israelis are injured in over 180 rockets and mortar attacks of Hamas fired at Israel, with Israeli Air Forces launching an air assault on 150 targets in Gaza, in which three people are killed, including an 18-month-old child.
  - Hamas's Al-Aqsa TV reports that a cease-fire is reached to end the latest round of fighting with Israel.
- August 14 – A period of indefinite closure is ended when Israel reopens the Gaza Kerem Shalom crossing.
- August 17 – Two Palestinians are killed and at least 270 others injured when Israeli Defense Forces fires on around 20,000 Palestinians protesting near the Israeli–Gaza barrier.

=== September ===
- September 2 – Philippines President Rodrigo Duterte visits Israel, making him the first Philippines president to do so.
- September 5 –
  - Israeli Supreme Court rejects appeals against the demolition of Khan al-Ahmar in the occupied West Bank whose fate has been a subject of international concern.
  - Paraguay announces that it will move its Israeli embassy from Jerusalem to Tel Aviv, reversing a May decision to move it from Tel Aviv to Jerusalem, citing efforts to achieve peace in the Middle East. Israeli Prime Minister Benjamin Netanyahu orders the closure of Israel's embassy in Paraguay.
- September 10 – Palestinian diplomat Saeb Erekat announces that the United States "is willing to disband the international system in order to protect Israeli crimes".
- September 15 – Stanford University researchers report discovery of evidence of the oldest known of a beer brewery, dating to approximately 11,000 BCE, located near modern Haifa.
- September 17 – Russia accuses Israeli forces of misleading Syrian forces with missile attacks, causing it to accidentally shoot down an Ilyushin Il-20 plane with fifteen Russian crew who all perished.
- September 25 – Tel Aviv–Jerusalem railway is officially inaugurated.

=== October ===
- October 6 – Defense Minister of Israel Avigdor Lieberman says that Israel will reduce the fishing zone off the Gaza Strip from 9 nautical miles (17 km; 10 mi) to 6 nautical miles (11 km; 6.9 mi) as a reaction to the weekly Gaza border protests. Three Palestinians were killed in yesterday's protest, in which over 20,000 protestors took part.
- October 7 –
  - Two Israelis killed, one injured by a Palestinian gunman inside the Barkan Industrial Park on the West Bank, fled the scene and remains at large.
- October 16 –
  - Australian Prime Minister Scott Morrison announces the consideration of his government recognising Jerusalem as the Israeli capital and relocating its embassy accordingly, in line with the United States, drawing local criticism and sparking outrage from members of the opposition. The announcement comes days before a by-election in which the governing party's candidate is Dave Sharma, a former ambassador to Israel.
- October 17 –
  - Palestinians in the Gaza Strip launch two rockets at Israel, one landing in the southern city of Beersheba, causing serious damage to a house but no injuries, and the other landing in the sea.
  - Israeli Air Force jets attack targets in Gaza including a tunnel crossing into Israel, tunnel digging sites, a factory storing components used for tunnel building and another for the manufacturing of aerial weaponry.
- October 21 – King Abdullah II announces Jordan will reclaim two small plots of farmland territory leased to Israel under their 1994 peace treaty.
- October 26 – Israel responds to 40 Palestinian rockets with 80 air strikes on what Israel states are Iranian and Hamas-controlled weapon factories in Gaza. An Egypt-meditated ceasefire is announced by Islamic Jihad soon afterward.
- October 30 – Israeli municipal elections are held across the country

=== November ===
- November 2 – The president-elect of Brazil, Jair Bolsonaro, states that he will honor his campaign pledge to move the country's embassy in Israel from Tel Aviv to Jerusalem.
- November 5 – The Iranian telecommunication minister Mohammad-Javad Azari Jahromi accuses Israel of a failed cyberattack on its telecommunications infrastructure, and vows to respond with legal action.
- November 11 – Seven Palestinians, including commander Nour Baraka and three other militants, are killed during a raid by the Israel Defense Forces in the southeastern Gaza Strip, that was supported by air attacks. One IDF officer was killed and another was injured. Over a dozen rockets were subsequently fired from Gaza, three of which were shot down.
- November 12 –
  - Israeli forces and Hamas exchange missile fire with 300 rockets being launched from Gaza within the span of three hours.
  - Israeli Air Force bombs Hamas-run Al-Aqsa TV's headquarters in Gaza City.
  - A rocket fired from Gaza strikes an apartment building in Ashkelon, killing a man and injuring two others. The victim was a middle aged illegal immigrant Palestinian from Hebron. This is the first person killed on Israeli soil due to Palestinian rocket fire since 2014.
- November 14 – Defence Minister Avigdor Lieberman announces his resignation with effect in 48 hours in response to the Egyptian-mediated ceasefire between Israel and Hamas.
- November 20 – Israel announces that, despite their agreement in July, it will not sign the United Nations Global Compact for Migration in Marrakesh on 10–11 December 2018.
- November 22 – Israeli-American man, Michael Kadar, is sentenced to 10 years in prison in Israel for making 2,000 hoax bomb threats that forced evacuations of Jewish community centers in the United States. The threats, made by phone and email in 2016 and 2017, raised concern that antisemitism was on the rise in the United States.
- November 26 – Three Israeli Defense Forces soldiers are injured, one moderately and two lightly, in a vehicle-ramming attack in the West Bank, with the assailant was shot dead by one of the soldiers.

=== December ===
- December 4 – The Israeli military launched Operation Northern Shield to destroy cross-border tunnels built by Hezbollah along Israel's border with Lebanon.
- December 13 –
  - Two Israeli soldiers are killed and two others seriously wounded after a shooting at a bus stop in the Jewish settlement of Giv'at Asaf, West Bank.
  - December 21 – Israel announced its departure from UNESCO, citing bias.
- December 15 – Australia formally recognizes West Jerusalem as the capital of Israel and East Jerusalem as the capital of a future Palestinian state but will not move its embassy from Tel Aviv until a peace settlement is reached with the Palestinians.

== Deaths ==
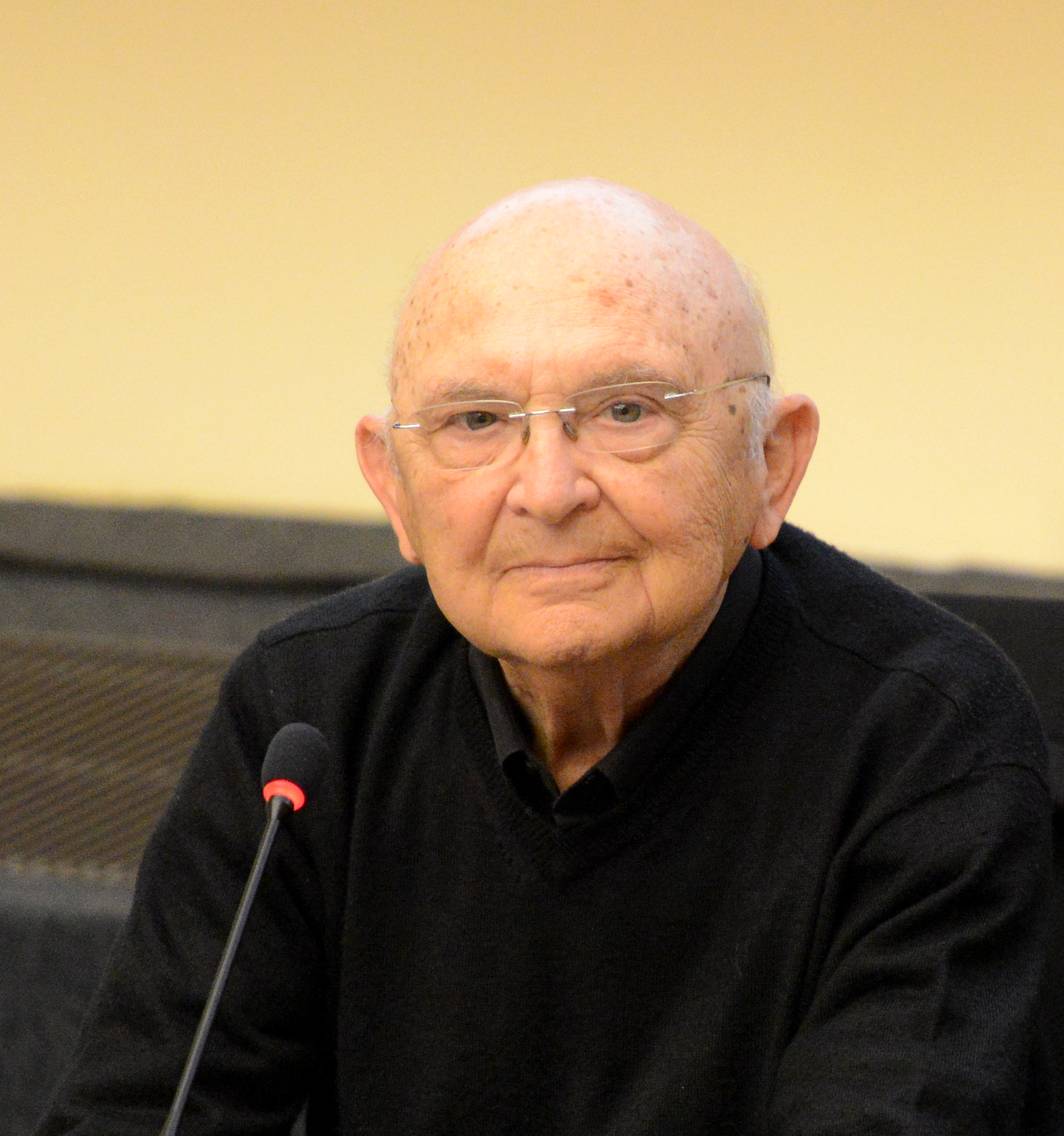
Aharon Appelfeld

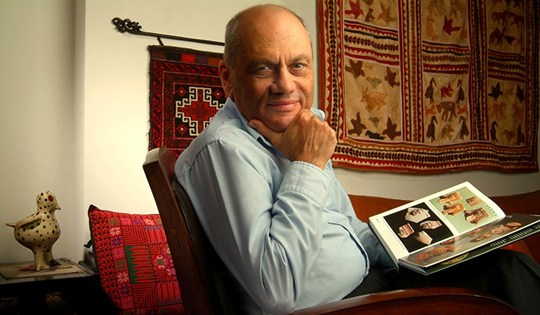
Ephraim Stern

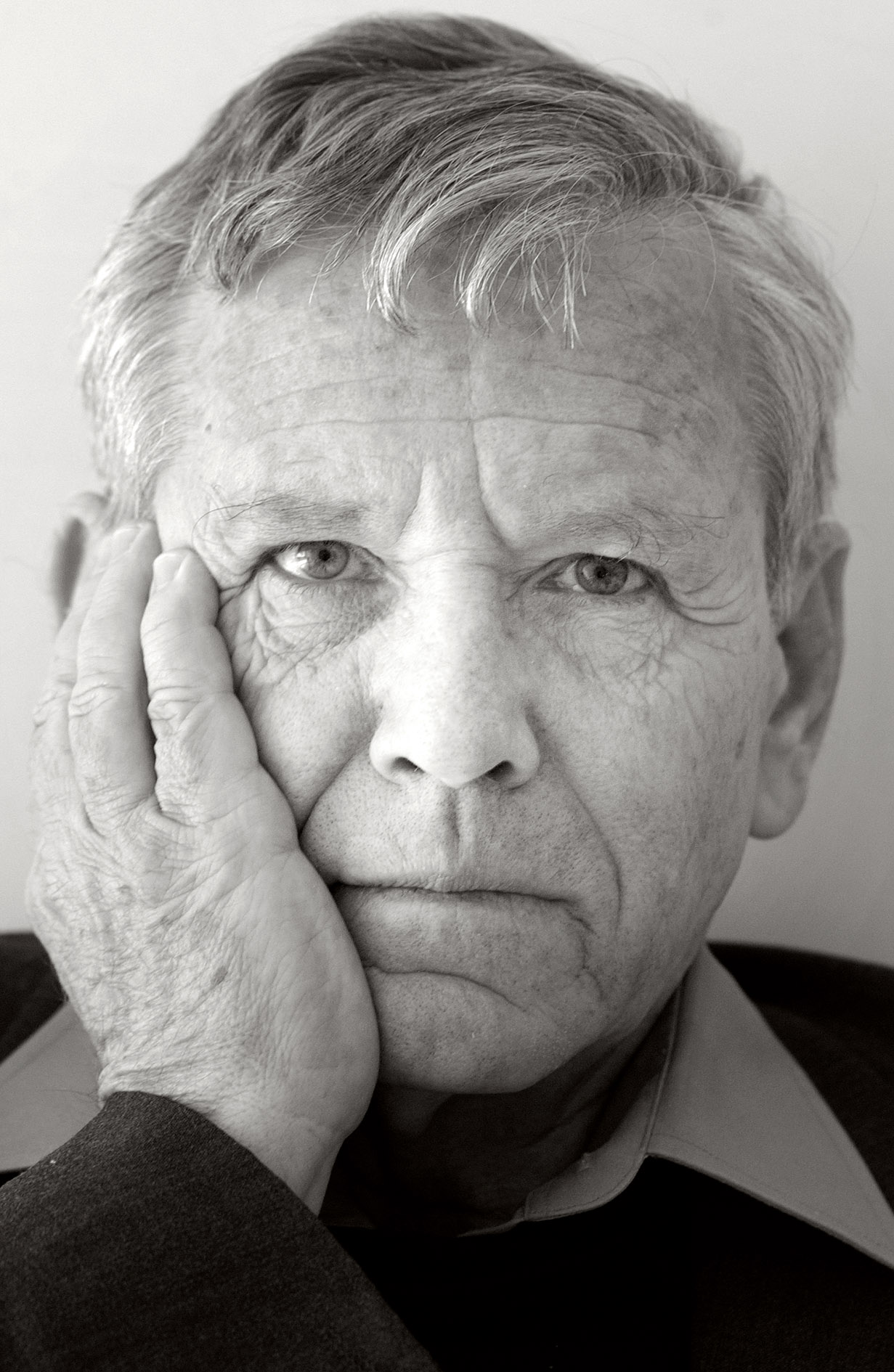
Amos Oz

- 4 January – Aharon Appelfeld, novelist (b. 1932)
- 6 January – Batya Ouziel, handicrafter (b. 1934)
- 13 January – Eliyahu Winograd, Israeli jurist and acting judge on the Supreme Court of Israel, chairman of the Winograd Commission (b. 1926)
- 20 January – Doron Rubin, military officer (b. 1944)
- 31 January – Dan Alon, fencer (b. 1945)
- 18 February – Ya'akov Ben-Yezri, Israeli politician, Minister of Health (b. 1927)
- 24 February – Shmuel Auerbach, Israeli Haredi rabbi and posek (b. 1931)
- 2 March – Haim Hanegbi, journalist and activist (born 1935)
- 5 March – Uri Lubrani, Israeli diplomat (b. 1926)
- 23 March – Ephraim Stern, archaeologist (b. 1934)
- 24 March – Rim Banna, singer, composer and activist (b. 1966)
- 24 March – Frank Meisler, architect and sculptor (b. 1925).
- 1 April – Avichai Rontzki, Israeli military Rabbi and rosh yeshiva (b. 1951)
- 4 May – Abi Ofarim, musician (b. 1937)
- 29 May – Eliezer Rafaeli, director of the University of Haifa (b. 1926)
- 20 August – Uri Avnery, peace activist (b. 1923)
- 30 October – David Azulai, politician (b. 1954)
- 7 December – Shmuel Flatto-Sharon, businessman and politician (b. 1930)
- 17 December – Rona Ramon, activist and NGO founder (b. 1964)
- 28 December – Amos Oz, writer, novelist and journalist (b. 1939)
- 29 December – Zvi Levi, activist and NGO founder (b. 1948)
- 29 December – Yehoshua Glazer, footballer (b. 1927)

== See also ==
- Israel at the 2018 Winter Olympics
- Timeline of the Israeli–Palestinian conflict in 2018
- 2018 Gaza-Israel conflict
