= Brukhin =

Israeli settlement in the West Bank

Brukhin: ברוכין (Hebrew)
- Israeli settlement
- Location within the Northern West Bank
- Coordinates: 32°4′54″N 35°5′28″E
- Country: Palestine
- District: Judea and Samaria Area
- Council: Shomron
- Region: West Bank
- Founded: 1998
- Population (2024): 2,808

Brukhin (Hebrew: ברוכין, also Bruchin) is an Israeli settlement located in the West Bank, about 1 km from the Palestinian city of Bruqin.

Over 101 Orthodox Jewish families are living in Brukhin. A further 100 families are due to move in as the settlement expands (2015). In 2024 its population was 2,808.

The international community considers Israeli settlements in the West Bank illegal under international law, but the Israeli government disputes this.

== History ==
According to ARIJ, Israel confiscated 332 dunams of land from the nearby Palestinian village of Bruqin in order to construct Brukhin.

Brukhin was founded in 1998 on non-private land claimed as state land by Israel as a trailer neighbourhood, and developed by one of the founding members, Amishai Shav-Tal, in October 2000, within the territory administered as part of its municipality by the Shomron Regional Council. The Sasson Report established that the Brukhin outpost was an unauthorized Israeli settlement. The report also said that $785,000 was spent on Brukhin's infrastructure and public buildings. Construction in the village was frozen in 2012 by an order from the Israeli High Court. In 2012 the Israeli state provided the illegal outpost with official authorization.

On May 15, 2025, a gunman opened fire on a car in Brukhin, killing a pregnant Israeli woman. Her child was delivered in an emergency caesarean section. Israeli authorities stated they were "deeply shocked by the horrific attack in [the northern West Bank] against a pregnant woman and her husband, while they were making their way to the delivery room", while Hamas praised the attack as a "heroic" response to Israel's "escalating crimes and ongoing aggression against our people in Gaza and the occupied West Bank".

== Popular culture ==
In July 2015 a "come and join" video was released on YouTube featuring a song sung by the families of Brukhin.

== See also ==
- Bruqin
