= 2018 Barkan Industrial Park shooting =

2018 terrorist attack in the West Bank

- Part of the Israeli–Palestinian conflict
- The attack site
- Native name: פיגוע הירי באזור התעשייה ברקן
- Location: 32°06′24″N 35°07′22″E; Barkan Industrial Park, West Bank
- Date: 7 October 2018; 8 years ago c. 7:30 (UTC+2)
- Attack type: Mass shooting
- Weapon: Carlo improvised rifle
- Deaths: 2 civilians
- Injuries: 1 civilian
- No. of participants: 1

On the morning of 7 October 2018, a Palestinian gunman opened fire on several Israeli civilians in the Barkan Industrial Park, killing two and critically injuring another. The shooting incident was declared a "terrorist attack" by the IDF. It was the first attack in the park and the second fatal attack in the West Bank to occur in three weeks.

The attacker, a 23-year-old Palestinian, had worked in the factory where the shooting took place.

IDF forces conducted an intensive two-month manhunt to capture the militant who fled the scene. The IDF arrested some relatives of the assailant.

== Reactions ==
Israeli Prime Minister Benjamin Netanyahu declared the shooting "a very severe terror attack".

== Manhunt for shooter ends in his death ==
The two-month long search for the shooter ended on 12 December when his hiding place was discovered by Israeli security. The militant was killed on 13 December 2018 after an armed clash with a special IDF force called Yamam in the Askar refugee camp in Nablus. He shot at the arresting officers, who returned fire, killing him.

The shooter, Ashraf Naalwa, 23, from the West Bank village of Shuweika near Tulkarem, was said by security officials to have been planning a new attack at the time he was found and killed.

The IDF ordered the demolition of Naalwa's home.
