= November 2018 Gaza–Israel clashes =

Botched Israeli covert operation and firefight in the Gaza Strip

Gaza–Israel clashes (November 2018)
- Part of the Gaza-Israel conflict
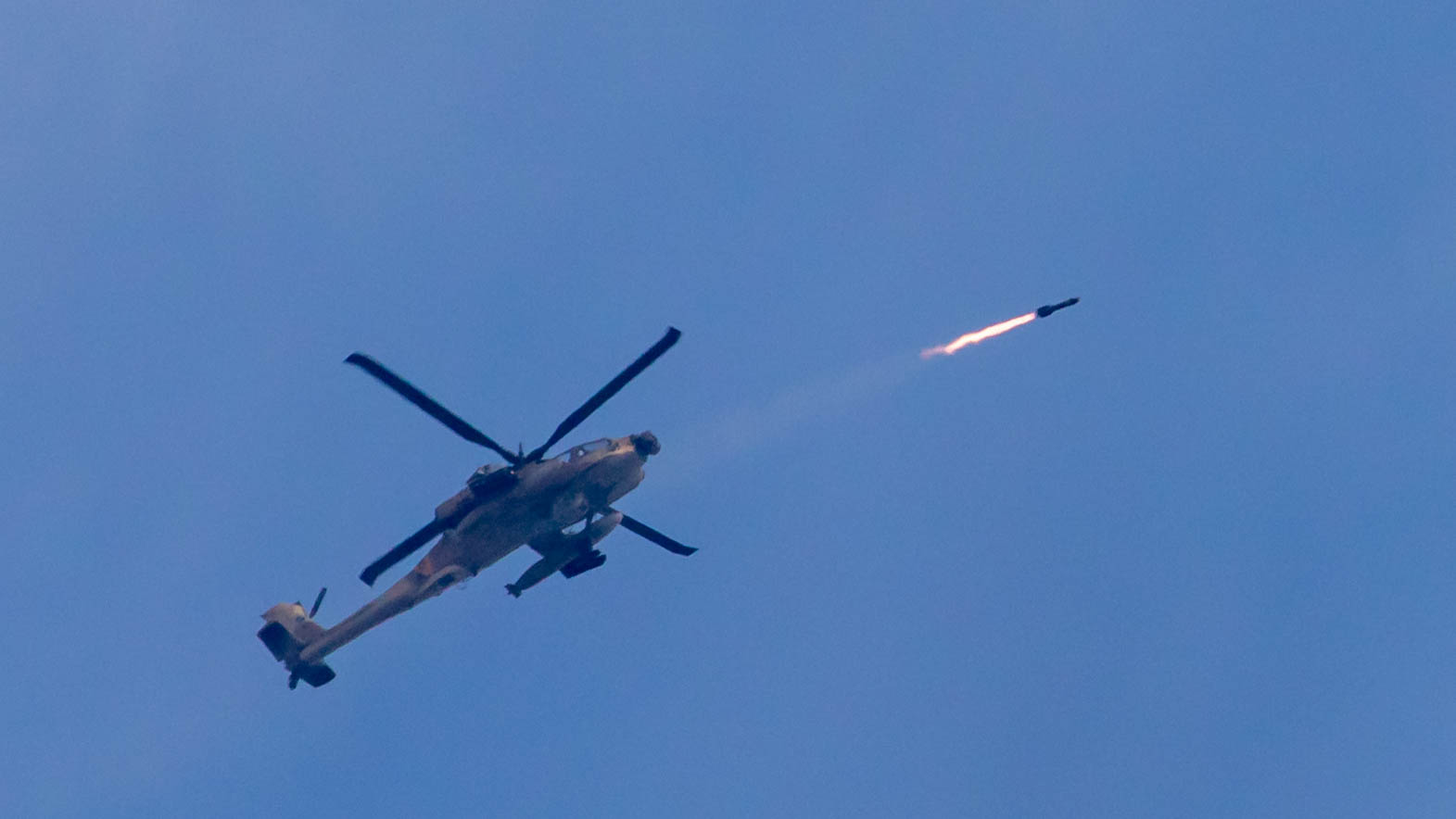
- An Israeli AH-64 Apache firing an AGM-114 Hellfire missile.
| Date | 11–13 November 2018 (2 days) |
| Location | Southern Gaza Strip; Israel |

Belligerents
| Gaza Strip: Hamas; Islamic Jihad; PFLP; al-Aqsa Martyrs' Brigades; PRC | Israel |

Units involved
| Izz ad-Din al-Qassam Brigades; Al-Nasser Salah al-Deen Brigades | Israel Defense Forces; Israel Air Force; Israeli Navy |

Casualties and losses
| In the operation: 7 militants killed; 6 militants wounded; From Israeli air and artillery bombardment: 6 killed (3 militants); 25 wounded | 1 commander killed 2 civilians killed (Note: One of the civilians killed was Mahmoud Abu Asba, a Palestinian man from Hebron. The other was 74-year-old Nina Gnisednova who died 10 months later of wounds received in the November 2018 clashes); 53 injured: 2 critical condition; 1 moderately injured; 23 lightly injured; 27 stress symptoms |

Gaza-Israel clashes began on 11 November 2018, when a botched Israeli covert operation carried out in the Khan Yunis area of the southern Gaza Strip killed seven Palestinian militants and one Israeli soldier. Exchanges of fire lasted for two more days, until a cease fire was achieved with Egyptian mediation. Some minor incidents and protests followed some two weeks after the cease fire, with decreasing intensity.

== The operation ==
According to Hamas armed wing the al-Qassam Brigades, witness reports, recordings of radio chatter obtained by Israeli news program Hadashot corroborating the story, and the IDFs own report the operation proceeded as follows:

=== Intrusion into Gaza ===
On 11 November, Israeli special forces entered Gaza in a blue Volkswagen van through one of the official border crossings, either through Israel's Erez Crossing or Egypt's Rafah Crossing, and the group provided identity documents. Following the crossing, the group passed through two checkpoints; one controlled by the Palestinian Authority and one controlled by Hamas using forged IDs with the names of well-known local Palestinian families. The group were dressed in traditional Palestinian Muslim attire and two of them disguised as women.

=== Spotting by Nour Baraka and questioning ===
A local Hamas commander named Nour Baraka spotted the van outside his window in Khan Yunis three kilometers into Gazan territory. The van was then stopped at a Hamas checkpoint for questioning. The Israelis claimed that they were NGO workers, part of a medical team ferrying patients in the area and that they had a wheelchair in the back of the van. According to the sources, the questioning lasted for 40 to 45 minutes.

Several things didn't seem right to the Palestinians. The accents of the Israelis didn't match the location their identity cards stated that they were from. A woman sat between two men even though their IDs said they were members of different families, something that was frowned upon under local customs. Furthermore, the Israelis told Hamas that they were going to visit a woman who does not live in the area.

Senior commanders were summed to the scene and they decided to bring the Israelis into custody for further questioning. At this point, the operative identified as "Lt. Col. A" opened fire. He shot and killed Baraka and his deputy, Mohammad Majed Al-Qara, with his silenced gun. Here the sources diverge. IDF sources claim that stray bullets from Lt. Col. A's gun hit and killed his colleague Lt. Col. Mahmoud Kheireddine, in Israeli media identified as "Lt. Col. M", and wounded another Israeli surrounded by Hamas members. Hamas sources claim that Kheireddine was shot in the head by one of their fighters. The van proceeded to speed away.

=== Hamas takes up the chase ===
One Hamas vehicle took up the chase while other units scrambled to set up a roadblock. At that point, the Palestinians believed that they were dealing with a criminal gang or a rival faction. The van opened fire and sped through the roadblock.

During the pursuit, Israeli tanks and aircraft opened fire in the area to provide cover for the van's escape. Some time later the operatives stepped out of the van and faced their pursuers in a gunfight killing them all. They pulled their dead comrade's body out of the car and continued the flight on foot towards an olive grove where a Sikorsky CH-53 helicopter from the Israeli Air Force's elite Unit 669 was waiting. After extracting the soldiers, the van was struck by dozens of Israeli rockets and completely destroyed.

According to the IDFs report, the evacuation from the time Lt. Col. A killed Baraka to the helicopter landing in Israel took 20 minutes.

=== Immediate aftermath ===
Gazan Health Ministry identified the killed as the aforementioned Nour Baraka, Omar Jani Abu Hatar, Mohammad Majed Al-Qara, Ala Adin Koidar, Mustafa Hassan Abu Odeh, Mahmoud Atallah Masabach and Ala Fasifis. The first six listed were Hamas members and the last a member of the Al-Nasser Salah al-Deen Brigades, the military wing of the Popular Resistance Committees. According to witness reports, three of them were killed by ground-fire and three by airstrikes, one later succumbing to his wounds. The Israeli soldier was identified as "Lt. Col. M." Six more militants and one Israeli was wounded in the operation.

The Israel Defense Forces (IDF) quickly dispelled a rumor about a soldier having been taken prisoner, but did not provide their account of the event other than noting, in response to Hamas allegations claiming otherwise, that it was "not intended to kill or abduct terrorists, but to strengthen Israeli security." IDF chief Gadi Eizenkot said that it was a "a very meaningful operation to Israel's security." In a television interview on Sunday night, the former commander of IDFs Southern Command, general Tal Russo, speculated that the raid wasn't an assassination attempt but an intelligence-gathering mission gone wrong.

Fawzi Barhoum, spokesperson for Hamas, denounced the "cowardly Israeli attack".

== Exchanges of fire ==
The clashes intensified over the next days as Gazan militants fired projectiles into Israel and Israeli airstrikes hit targets in Gaza. 460 projectiles were fired into Israel, of which 100 were intercepted by the Iron Dome and the majority of the projectiles that weren't fell in open areas causing neither casualties nor property damage. The IDF attacked about 160 targets in Gaza, among them several "high-quality" multi-story buildings, unprecedented since the 2014 Gaza war. These clashes killed eight Palestinians - seven in Gaza and one in Israel.

=== Sunday 11 November 2018 ===
12 November 2018 Israeli shelling of Al-Aqsa TV in Gaza

In the hours after the operation, 17 rockets were fired from Gaza into Israel of which three were shot down, causing sirens to sound in southern Israel and Israeli authorities to change the flight path of aircraft landing at Ben-Gurion Airport as a precautionary measure. In communities near the Gaza border, classes were cancelled for Monday morning and farmers advised not to work in their fields.

Israeli Prime Minister Benjamin Netanyahu cut his visit to France short and returned to preside over a Security Cabinet meeting concerning the clashes that would be held on Tuesday. Commenting on the situation, he said that "no political solution exists for Gaza, just as there isn't one with ISIS", that he is doing what he can to avoid an "unnecessary war" and also that "we were a step away from exerting maximal force and I think Hamas understood this." In a tweet he commended the slain soldiers bravery and wrote that "our forces acted courageously."

=== Monday 12 November 2018 ===
In the morning, Mousa Abu Marzook, a senior member of Hamas, said that yesterdays operation "exposed the Israeli occupation's hypocritical behavior with the international community" and the organisation issued a statement "announcing the beginning of bombardment of the enemy's settlements" as a "response to yesterday's crime." Islamic Jihad that "unless Palestinians live in peace, they won't live in peace. Playing with the lives of Palestinians can't be without a price."

At least 300 projectiles, of which 60 were intercepted, were fired from Gaza into Israel during the day, wounding nine civilians. In the afternoon in Kfar Aza a Kornet anti-tank missile hit a bus transporting soldiers, critically injuring a 19-year-old Israeli soldier standing nearby. An accompanying video showing the bus being blown up was uploaded on Twitter by the Hamas-affiliated Quds News Network. During the night to Tuesday, a rocket directly hit a residential building in Ashkelon, killing Mahmoud Abu Asba, a Palestinian man from Hebron, and wounding two women. Factions inside Gaza said these attacks were in retaliation for yesterday's Israeli operation.

The Israeli Air Force struck more than 70 targets in Gaza. Among them the building hosting Hamas' television broadcasting station Al-Aqsa which was leveled to the ground, an attack denounced by Barhoum as "a barbaric, brazen aggression." Soon after strikes destroyed Al Aqsa radio station and Al Amal Hotel, a building Hamas uses for offices. In addition, a weapons storage facility in Khan Yunis, a military building in Zeitoun and a weapons manufacturing site in Sheikh Omdan were bombarded.

The Israeli navy attacked a ship belonging to Hamas at the Nuseirat port in southern Gaza.

Three Palestinians were killed by tank fire into Gaza and nine were wounded. Two of those, Muhammad Zakariya al-Tatari and Muhammad Zuhdi Odeh, were members of the PFLP and the third, Hamad Muhammad Musa al-Nahhal, killed east of Rafah, of Islamic Jihad.

Saeb Erekat of Hamas rival faction Fatah called for "international protection" and for the international community "to prevent a new massacre in Gaza."

Commenting on the violence, Israeli deputy minister Michael Oren said that Israel "will do whatever it takes" to defend itself and that he "expects the world to stand with us."

Abu Rukun wrote on the unit's Arabic-language Facebook page a sharply worded warning addressed to the Gazans about "terrorist activity" that ended with "Residents of Gaza, look carefully at the pictures from Operation Protective Edge in 2014 – a picture is worth a thousand words", alluding to the destruction Israeli bombardment caused in the 2014 Gaza war. According to one activist, the same threat was made in English on COGAT:s Twitter feed, @cogat_israel, but was quickly deleted.

Knesset members of the opposition expressed criticism over Netanyahu's Cabinet's handling of the conflict with Hamas. Tzipi Livni of the Zionist Union stated "we have a strategic dispute with the government on the ways to attain long-term quiet ... Instead of accepting the situation, we must act, but differently", referring to the recently signed deal to allow Qatar to send $15 million in cash to Hamas.

Yesh Atid of Yair Lapid suggested that the government should take better care of persons affected by the violence, by compensating parents that needed to stay at home due to school closures and that mental health centers should receive more backing.

=== Tuesday 13 November 2018 ===
Three Palestinians were killed and three more were wounded by Israeli airstrikes during the day. The victims were identified as Khaled Riyadh al-Sultan, a farmer not part of any militant group, Musaab Hoss and Khalid Akram Youssef Maarouf.

Palestinian President Mahmoud Abbas cut his visit to Kuwait short and called for an urgent meeting among the Palestinian leadership.

== Cease-fire ==
On Tuesday the Israeli Security Cabinet conferred in a seven-hour long meeting, from 9:00 to 16:00, behind closed doors. While the meeting was ongoing, it was reported that Hamas through mediators sought a cease-fire with Israel. Hamas leader Ismail Haniyeh suggested that "if Israel stops the aggression, it will be possible to go back to the cease-fire understandings... the resistance defended its people against Israeli aggression, and the Palestinian people, as usual, continued to the resist with patience and pride."

Later that day Palestinian factions in Gaza released a statement announcing that a cease-fire had been reached. Hamas said that it "appreciates efforts alongside different entities to obtain a cease-fire and we thank and cherish the Egyptian effort and the international effort, as well as the role the Norwegians and Qataris played."

On the Israeli side, the situation was more ambiguous. An unnamed Israeli official's response to queries from the press was that "Israel reserves its freedom to operate" but confirmed that "requests by Hamas to form a cease-fire came from four different mediators. Israel responded that developments on the ground will determine [the Israeli reaction]." The four mediating parties named were Egypt, the United Nations, Norway and Switzerland.

Energy Minister Yuval Steinitz, who had participated in the cabinet meeting, refrained from confirming whether a cease-fire had been reached and instead put the onus on Hamas, claiming that "the Israeli military landed a harsh and unprecedented blow on Hamas" and that "we will see if that will suffice or whether further blows will be required."

At least four other members of the cabinet, Defense Minister Avigdor Liberman, Justice Minister Ayelet Shaked, Environmental Protection Minister Ze'ev Elkin, and Education Minister Naftali Bennett said they opposed the cease-fire but that Prime Minister Benjamin Netanyahu forced the decision by not allowing the cabinet to vote. Netanyahu, a few days later, dismissed those claims as "spin" and that the reason why no vote was held was because the cabinet unanimously supported the cease-fire.

Members of the opposition sharply criticized the decision to allow the cease-fire. Ofer Shelah of Yesh Atid called Netanyahu a "a coward in war and a coward in diplomacy" as did Itzik Shmuli of the Zionist Union, calling for "landing a terrible blow on Hamas…We are not trigger happy but this [deal] is an accord of weakness that erases Israeli deterrence." But other members of the Knesset welcomed the cease-fire.

=== Palestinian and Israeli public reactions ===
Residents of Israeli towns close to the Gaza border met the news of the cease-fire with anger. In Sderot hundreds gathered, blocking roads and burning tires, to express their dissatisfaction, while in Gaza it was met with joy as thousands took to the streets celebrating and waving Hamas' green flags. Meanwhile, peace groups held demonstrations in Haifa, Tel Aviv and Jerusalem, requesting a cease-fire.

The Israeli protests against the cease-fire centered around Sderot continued on Wednesday. On Thursday night about 1,000 demonstrators gathered in Tel Aviv, blocking the highway outside the Azrieli Center.

=== Political ramifications ===
On Wednesday morning, calling for early elections, Israeli defense minister Avigdor Lieberman resigned from the government, saying that the ceasefire was "surrendering to terror". The resignation was welcomed by Hamas spokesperson Sami Abu Zuhri who said it "showed a state of weakness that has overcome the Israelis."

Political commentators thought that the resignation would trigger an early election in Israel which are scheduled to be held in November 2019. With Lieberman leaving the government and taking his party's five Knesset members with him, Netanyahu's coalition was left with a thin majority of only 61 out of 120 members. To make matters worse, Bennett requested that he'd be given the defense portfolio, a request that was supported by other high-ranking members of his party who said they would otherwise decide to leave the government. Instead, Netanyahu himself took on Lieberman's defense portfolio and rejected calls to hold early elections as "irresponsible" and Bennett backed down from his demand. The decision to stay in the government was slammed by Lieberman who said that Bennett and Shaked were "stuck to their seats at any cost."

== Incidents after the cease-fire ==
=== Wednesday 14 November 2018 ===
A Palestinian man was shot and arrested as he was throwing grenades at the security fence in northern Gaza, according to Israeli military sources. Later in the day, also in northern Gaza, Nuaf Ahmad al-Attar, a 23-year-old fisherman was killed by the Israeli navy. Local sources said he was working on the beach when he was shot in the stomach. Israeli military sources said he was approaching the security fence.

=== Thursday 15 November 2018 ===
Regional Cooperation Minister Tzachi Hanegbi was lambasted for statements he made in an interview with Israeli Army Radio: "Hamas responded [to the botched IDF mission] in a measured manner and attacked only the Gaza border area. There's a difference between the border area and Tel Aviv, the economic capital of Israel. Hamas's attack was minor, because (rocket) fire at Tel Aviv has different ramifications." Netanyahu immediately distanced himself from the comments and Hanegbi apologized for them.

=== Friday 16 November 2018 ===
For the 34th Friday straight, nearly 10,000 Palestinians gathered in the afternoon for the weekly March of Return demonstrations near the Gaza fence which often leads to clashes with the Israeli side and Palestinian casualties. In the protests, one Palestinian was killed and over 40 more wounded by live fire from Israeli soldiers near the refugee camps Bureij and Rafah.

The day prior to the demonstrations, Kamil Abu Rukun, the Coordinator of Government Activities in the Territories (COGAT), had posted an Arabic language video on his Facebook page, warning the Palestinians that Israel's "patience has run out" and that the military would show "zero restraint." Organizers of the protests had urged the people to demonstrate "to thank the resistance" but also to stay away from the fence.

=== Saturday 17 November 2018 ===
According to Palestinian sources, a farmer was shot in the leg by Israeli forces as he was working his land in the eastern part of the Maghazi refugee camp in Gaza. In northern Gaza, bulldozers entered into Deir al-Balah and leveled land.

=== Monday 19 November 2018 ===
On Monday, Palestinians staged for the 16th time this year a maritime protest using 20 boats while demonstrators gathered on the beach near Beit Lahia in northern Gaza. Israeli forces responded with shooting tear gas and live fire at the protesters. 25 people were wounded, among them an Associated Press cameraman who were shot in his left ankle. According to witness reports, he was standing 600 meters from the security fence and was wearing a protective vest with the word "PRESS" written on it.

=== Thursday 22 November 2018 ===
On Thursday, the Israeli Security Agency Shin Bet announced that it had uncovered a Hamas-connected cell in the West Bank which was planning to launch an attack in Israel. According to Shin Bet, the plan was to carry out the attack as soon as possible.

=== Friday 23 November 2018 ===
For the 35th consecutive Friday, Palestinians protested near the fence demarcating the Gaza-Israeli border. 14 were wounded by Israeli fire in demonstrations that was characterized as quieter than usual.

== International response ==
Condemnations from international parties were mixed, some blamed Hamas for the clashes, others Israel and yet others both sides.

Jason Greenblatt, US President Donald Trump's envoy to the Middle East put the blame for the recent spur of violence on Hamas, "Gaza terrorists are once again attacking Israel with rockets and mortars. ... Israel must once again use military force to protect its citizens. We stand with Israel in its defense against these attacks. ... This violence is preventing true assistance to the people of Gaza." As did Austrian Chancellor Sebastian Kurz who on Tuesday condemned the rocket attacks from Gaza and called for violence to stop immediately.

Czech Republic President Milos Zeman said that Israel reserves the right to an "aggressive response" to the bombardment of its citizens and France's foreign ministry condemned the barrage rockets fired by Hamas "in the strongest terms".

Ibrahim Kalin, spokesperson to the Turkish president said "These attacks have once again shown Israel’s unlawful, tyrannical, and occupying stance." Syria slammed Israeli actions.

Other parties urged restraint on both sides. On Monday, the UN Mideast envoy Nickolay Mladenov tweeted that the "#UN is working closely with #Egypt and all concerned to ensure that #Gaza steps back from the brink. The escalation in the past 24hrs is EXTREMELY dangerous and reckless."

EU ambassador to Israel Emanuele Giaufret urged everyone to "step back from the brink."

On Tuesday Kuwait, Bolivia and Palestinian President Mahmoud Abbas requested an urgent meeting with the UN Security Council to discuss Gaza. The request was granted and the Security Council announced that it would convene later that day. Danny Danon, Israel's envoy to the UN, cautioned that Israel would "not accept a call for 'both sides to act with restraint.'" The council, however, failed to agree on any action.

== Investigation ==
Both Hamas and media conducted investigations to try and understand the purpose of the botched Israeli operation, what its purpose was and how the IDF had infiltrated Gaza.

On 28 November Hamas claimed to have identified over 80% of the Israeli force's moves.

=== Purpose of the operation ===
Hamas claimed that the wreckage of the car contained a listening device, and that the purpose of the mission was to replace similar spy equipment on Hamas' private communications network uncovered earlier that year in May. According to the group, the IDF had previously installed listening devices near the border, under the cover of works done by one of the Palestinian telecommunications companies. Reportedly, they had successfully removed those devices.

=== Photos of the "fugitives" ===
On 22 November, the al-Qassam brigades released photos on social media of the eight operatives they said were involved in the Gaza raid, urging the public to contact them with information about the whereabouts of the "fugitives" and their collaborators. Pictures of two vehicles, a Volkswagen van and a Mercedes truck, were also published. According to Hamas the truck could still be operating inside Gaza. The photos were reportedly acquired by Hamas when the special forces entered Gaza through the Erez crossing using fake IDs of real Gaza residents with the photos swapped. The residents whose IDs the Israeli special forces had forged were detained but later released when it was found out that they didn't know that their IDs had been used by the Israelis.

The Israeli Military Censor in a rare public statement in response, urged Israelis not to spread the information as it could help Hamas "decipher and understand" the operation. Israeli media, which almost always complies with instructions from the censor, therefore could only publish pixelated or blurred photos pre-approved by the censor. But in international media the photos were published verbatim. To further contain the spread of the photos, Israel blocked the websites of Hamas' military wing.

=== Information about the operatives ===
According to the Hamas, the Israeli operatives were part of the Sayeret Matkal unit, established in 1957 to collect intelligence behind enemy lines.

=== Palestinian collaborators ===
According to Hamas, the Israeli forces were helped by Palestinian collaborators. The collaborators both provided the Israelis with two cars and helped them install listening devices. Supposedly, to catch collaborators Hamas setup roadblocks and conducted random searches in the week following the operation.

On 3 December, the military court in Gaza announced that it had sentenced six convicted Palestinian collaborators to death and seven more to life in prison.

In January 2019, Hamas announced that it had arrested a further 45 alleged spies and collaborators linked to the botched raid.

=== Military base in Gaza ===
Investigations by Hamas found that the unit involved in the covert operation was part of a longer, broad operation inside Gaza, masquerading as members of the German humanitarian organization Humedica which provides humanitarian and medical aid for Palestinians in Gaza. These forces were operating from a house and yard that they had rented from an unknowing Palestinian police officer.

This way, they gained access to sensitive locations such as rocket launching sites, tunnel entrances and senior Hamas members homes.

=== IDF investigation ===
In the first half of 2019, the IDF conducted its own investigation of the botched raid in Gaza. The investigation revealed that the officer killed in the raid, still only identified as Lt. Col. M, was killed by friendly fire.

According to the investigation, the operatives were equipped with false documents which were found to be suspicious by the Hamas militias. After having been interrogated for 45 minutes a commander of the operative group, identified only as Lt. Col. A shot and killed one of the interrogators, ostensibly Nour Baraka.

The report lauded Lt. Col. A for his actions, despite also identifying him as the one who shot and killed Kheireddine He was also considered for a medal of honor.

Overall, the report deemed the raid to have been a failure.

=== Al Jazeera documentary ===
In December 2019, Al Jazeera's news program Ma Khafia Aazam sent a one-hour documentary in Arabic about the botched Israeli raid and the subsequent flareup in violence.

== Economic and social impact ==
The rocket attacks from Gaza had some effect on businesses and restaurants in southern Israel. The finance minister announced compensation to businesses for losses and the Israel Tax Authority to parents that missed work because they had to stay at home with their children due to the school closure that the Home Front Command had imposed.

On 21 November, the Tax Authority announced that these regulations would be finalized in the coming days and provide compensation to tourism operators, business owners, parents who missed work and beekeepers for losses suffered due to Gaza clashes from May 2018 to the end of the year.

On the Gazan side, the financial losses incurred by the destruction of the Al Aqsa building was estimated to $2 million. In total, nine buildings were destroyed by Israeli airstrikes, six of them high-rises, causing an unknown amount of financial damage and displacing 100 families.

== Criticism of IDF's media handling ==
In the hours following the botched operation in Gaza, the IDF, in contrast to Hamas, kept relatively silent about the details of it. This brought on the ire of some Israeli journalists who felt that the IDFs media handling was old-fashioned. On Monday, Israel Radio's Gal Berger tweeted that "the Israeli media ran with the Hamas version of events. And isn’t to blame for that" and that the IDF waited too long with countering the Gazan narrative "In 2018, they don’t have the luxury of waiting 10 hours before countering the claims being spread by the other side, and here as well."

In an apparent jab at the Israeli Military Censor, Ramallah-based journalist Marian Houk tweeted that "It's 2018 -- and when you censor something, you're supposed to know that you can't censor; you lose control of the story and information. The details get out anyway (sometimes with extra disinformation)..."

Another point of contention was that the Israeli military censor prohibited the press from publishing details about the slain soldier. He was only identified by his rank and first initial, "Lt. Col. M." But on social media, pictures of him and his family had already begun to spread. Israeli MKs Shelly Yachimovich and Ksenia Svetlova published details identifying the soldier on their Facebook pages, defying the censor's orders. Judah Ari Gross of The Times of Israel, hours after the botched operation, tweeted "I know the officer's identity but cannot publish the information as it is subject to a military censor (because Israel still has one in 2018)." Nachman Shai, journalist and MK of the Zionist Union, claimed that "the social media networks defeated the military censor" further urging the IDF to adapt to the new media landscape.

Details of the operation remain under a strict gag order by the Israeli military censor and all articles the Israeli media writes about it must be pre-approved.

== See also ==
- 2018 Gaza border protests
- Gaza–Israel clashes (May 2019)
- List of Israeli attacks on Palestine
- List of violent incidents in the Israeli–Palestinian conflict, 2018
- Palestinian rocket attacks on Israel
