= Haris, Salfit =

Haris
- Municipality type D (Village council)

Arabic transcription(s)
  - Arabic: حارس
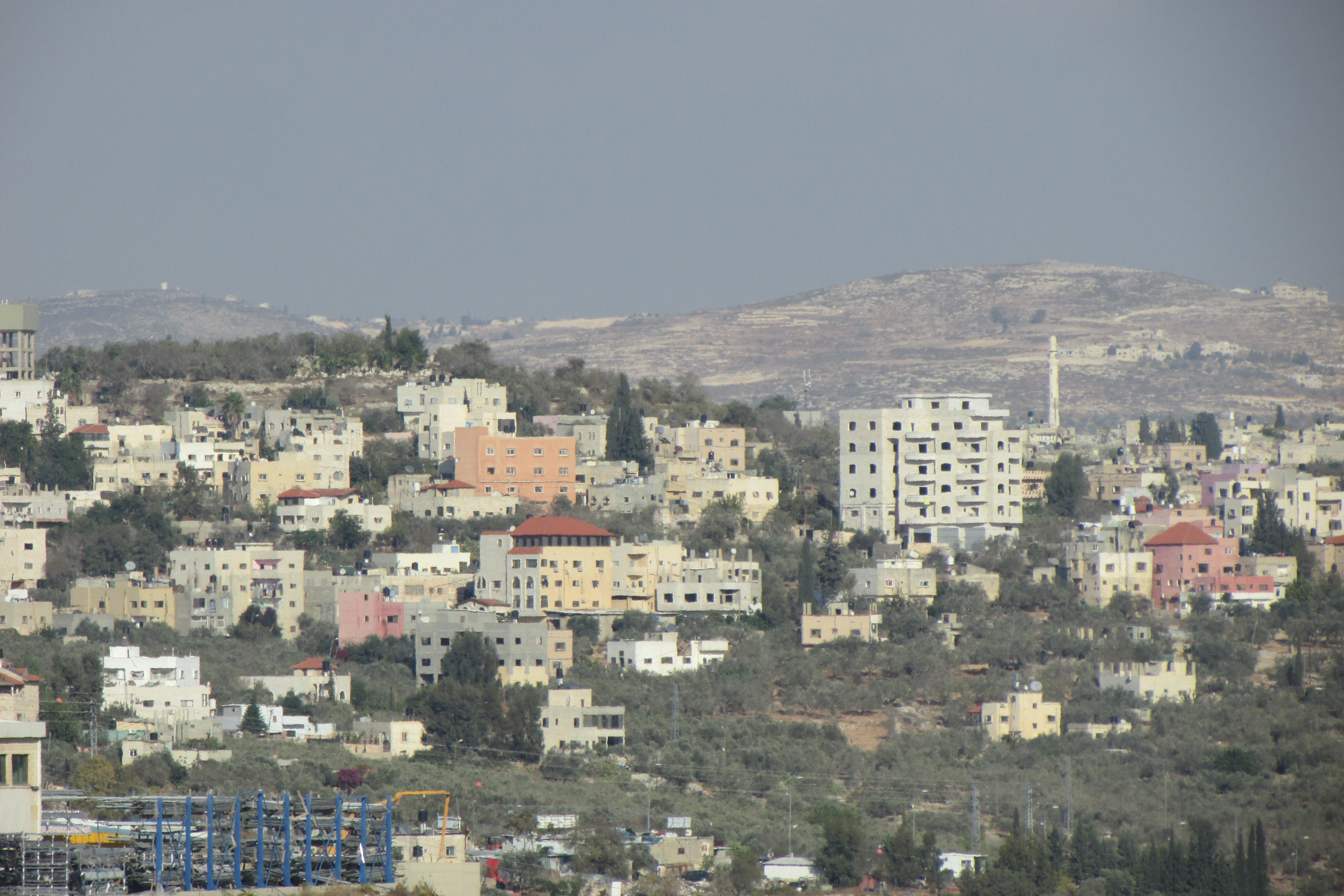
- Haris

- Location of Haris within Palestine
- Coordinates: 32°06′51″N 35°08′28″E
- Palestine grid: 163/169
- State: State of Palestine
- Governorate: Salfit

Government
  - Type: Village council
- Elevation: 486 m (1,594 ft)

Population (2017)
  - Total: 4,137
- Name meaning: The watch

Haris (Arabic: حارس) is a Palestinian town in the Salfit Governorate of the State of Palestine, in the northern West Bank, 24 kilometers Southwest of Nablus. According to the Palestinian Central Bureau of Statistics, it had a population of 4,137 in 2017.

== Location ==
Haris is 5.11 kilometers (3.18 mi) north-west of Salfit. It is bordered by Kifl Haris to the east, Salfit and Bruqin to the south, Sarta and Qarawat Bani Hassan to the west, and Deir Istiya to the north.

== History ==
It has been suggested (by Félix-Marie Abel, 1927, supported by Michael Avi-Yonah) that Hares is identical with ancient Arus (Greek: Άρους), a town that Josephus reported was destroyed or plundered by Arab troops of Varus' army circa 4 BCE. No sherds from that era have been found here.

Sherds from the Mamluk era have been found here. In 1359 it is mentioned by Ibn Kadi as a place bought by the Sultan.

=== Khirbet a-Tell ===
East of the village is Kh. a-Tell, a prominent hill featuring remains from various periods. Potsherds recovered at the site spans the Middle Bronze Age II, Iron Age I–II, Persian, Hellenistic, Roman, Byzantine, and medieval periods.

The site is understood to preserve the remains of a Hellenistic-period fortress. The structure, measuring approximately 60 by 40 meters, was built of well-dressed limestone. Some sections are preserved up to 2.5 meters high, and the base of a large tower is visible on the northwest corner. The internal layout has been obscured by later cultivation. Archaeologist Shimon Dar identified the site with the estate of Ptolemy of Rhodes, a senior official under Herod the Great who, according to Josephus, owned property at Arus (possibly on land inherited by Herod from the Hasmonean dynasty). The area's fertile land, extensive terracing, and proximity to ancient road networks suggest the fort may have served both as an administrative estate center and a military outpost within a royal domain.

=== Ottoman era ===
In 1517, the village was included in the Ottoman Empire with the rest of Palestine, and potsherds from the early Ottoman period have been found. It appeared in the 1596 tax-records as Harit, located in the Nahiya of Jabal Qubal, part of the Sanjak of Nablus. The population was 21 households, all Muslim. They paid a fixed tax sum of 12,000 akçe, in addition to taxes on "agnan", bee hives, and occasional revenues; a total of 13,300 akçe.

In the 18th and 19th centuries, the village formed part of the highland region known as Jūrat ‘Amra or Bilād Jammā‘īn. Situated between Dayr Ghassāna in the south and the present Route 5 in the north, and between Majdal Yābā in the west and Jammā‘īn, Mardā and Kifl Ḥāris in the east, this area served, according to historian Roy Marom, "as a buffer zone between the political-economic-social units of the Jerusalem and the Nablus regions. On the political level, it suffered from instability due to the migration of the Bedouin tribes and the constant competition among local clans for the right to collect taxes on behalf of the Ottoman authorities."

In 1838, Edward Robinson noted it as a village, Harith, in the Jurat Merda district, south of Nablus.

In 1870 Guérin observed here a building used as a mosque, divided into three naves separated by marble columns of different sizes, and evidently ancient. 'On a neighbouring Tell, which commands the village, are the ruins of an ancient tower. The spot is now planted with olives. Two ancient tombs and several cisterns cut in the rock once belonged to the ancient city which stood here.'

In 1870/1871 (1288 AH), an Ottoman census listed the village with a population of 50 households in the nahiya (sub-district) of Jamma'in al-Awwal, subordinate to Nablus.

In 1882, the PEF's Survey of Western Palestine (SWP) described Haris as "a medium sized village on high ground built of stone, and supplied by cisterns. It has rock-cut tombs and is probably an ancient site; there are fine olive groves round it."

=== British Mandate era ===
In the 1922 census of Palestine conducted by the British Mandate authorities, Haris (called: Hares) had a population of 285, all Muslims, increasing in the 1931 census to 394, except for one Christian all were Muslim, in a total of 99 houses.

In the 1945 statistics the population was 540, all Muslims, while the total land area was 8,391 dunams, according to an official land and population survey. Of this, 1,545 were used for plantations and irrigable land, 1,341 for cereals, while 21 dunams were classified as built-up areas.

=== Jordanian era ===
In the wake of the 1948 Arab–Israeli War, and after the 1949 Armistice Agreements, Haris came under Jordanian rule.

In 1961, the population was 726.

=== Post-1967 ===
Since the Six-Day War in 1967, Haris has been held under Israeli occupation.

After the 1995 accords, about 6% of village land was classified as Area B land, while the remaining 94% was classified as Area C.

==== Loss of land ====
Haris has been directly affected by the construction of the wall on the West Bank and the settlements surrounding Ariel and the Barkan Industrial Park. ARIJ, a Palestinian research institute lists the losses as follows:

Israeli Settlements bordering Haris village and land loss
Settlement	Date of establishment	Pop 2007	Area/Dunums	Area expropriated from the village pre 2008
Barqan	1981	1,300	649	304
Revava	1991	827	399	78
Barqan Industrial Zone	1981	–	1,417	1,417
Qiryat Netafim	1982	438	386	188
Ariel West Park Industrial	NA	–	1,728	1,110
Total		2,565	4,579	3,097
Source: ARIJ 2008

In late October 2014, Israel expropriated a further 20 dunams (5 acres) of land, near the Israeli settlement of Barkan.

On May 24, 2020, Israeli Settlers from the Revava settlement, located on the lands of Haris, northwest of Salfit Governorate, uprooted and stolen more than 150–200 olive trees. The Palestinian Colonization and Wall Resistance Commission began performing Peaceful Sit-in every Friday in the lands of Haris since May 29, 2020.

== Bibliography ==
- Barron, J.B., ed. (1923). Palestine: Report and General Abstracts of the Census of 1922. Government of Palestine.
- Conder, C.R.; Kitchener, H.H. (1882). The Survey of Western Palestine: Memoirs of the Topography, Orography, Hydrography, and Archaeology. Vol. 2. London: Committee of the Palestine Exploration Fund.
- Dar, Shimon (1986). Landscape and Pattern: An Archaeological Survey of Samaria 800 BCE–636 CE. B.A.R. International Series. Vol. 308. Oxford. pp. 221–223. ISBN 9781407388274.
- Finkelstein, I.; Lederman, Zvi, eds. (1997). Highlands of many cultures. Tel Aviv: Institute of Archaeology of Tel Aviv University Publications Section. ISBN 965-440-007-3.
- Government of Jordan, Department of Statistics (1964). First Census of Population and Housing. Volume I: Final Tables; General Characteristics of the Population (PDF).
- Government of Palestine, Department of Statistics (1945). Village Statistics, April, 1945.
- Guérin, V. (1875). Description Géographique Historique et Archéologique de la Palestine (in French). Vol. 2: Samarie, pt. 2. Paris: L'Imprimerie Nationale.
- Hadawi, S. (1970). Village Statistics of 1945: A Classification of Land and Area ownership in Palestine. Palestine Liberation Organization Research Center.
- Hütteroth, W.-D.; Abdulfattah, K. (1977). Historical Geography of Palestine, Transjordan and Southern Syria in the Late 16th Century. Erlanger Geographische Arbeiten, Sonderband 5. Erlangen, Germany: Vorstand der Fränkischen Geographischen Gesellschaft. ISBN 3-920405-41-2.
- Mills, E., ed. (1932). Census of Palestine 1931. Population of Villages, Towns and Administrative Areas. Jerusalem: Government of Palestine.
- Palmer, E.H. (1881). The Survey of Western Palestine: Arabic and English Name Lists Collected During the Survey by Lieutenants Conder and Kitchener, R. E. Transliterated and Explained by E.H. Palmer. Committee of the Palestine Exploration Fund.
- Robinson, E.; Smith, E. (1841). Biblical Researches in Palestine, Mount Sinai and Arabia Petraea: A Journal of Travels in the year 1838. Vol. 3. Boston: Crocker & Brewster.
