= Bruqin =

- Municipality type D (Village council)

Arabic transcription(s)
  - Arabic: إبروقين
  - Latin: Buruqin (official); Ibruqin (unofficial)
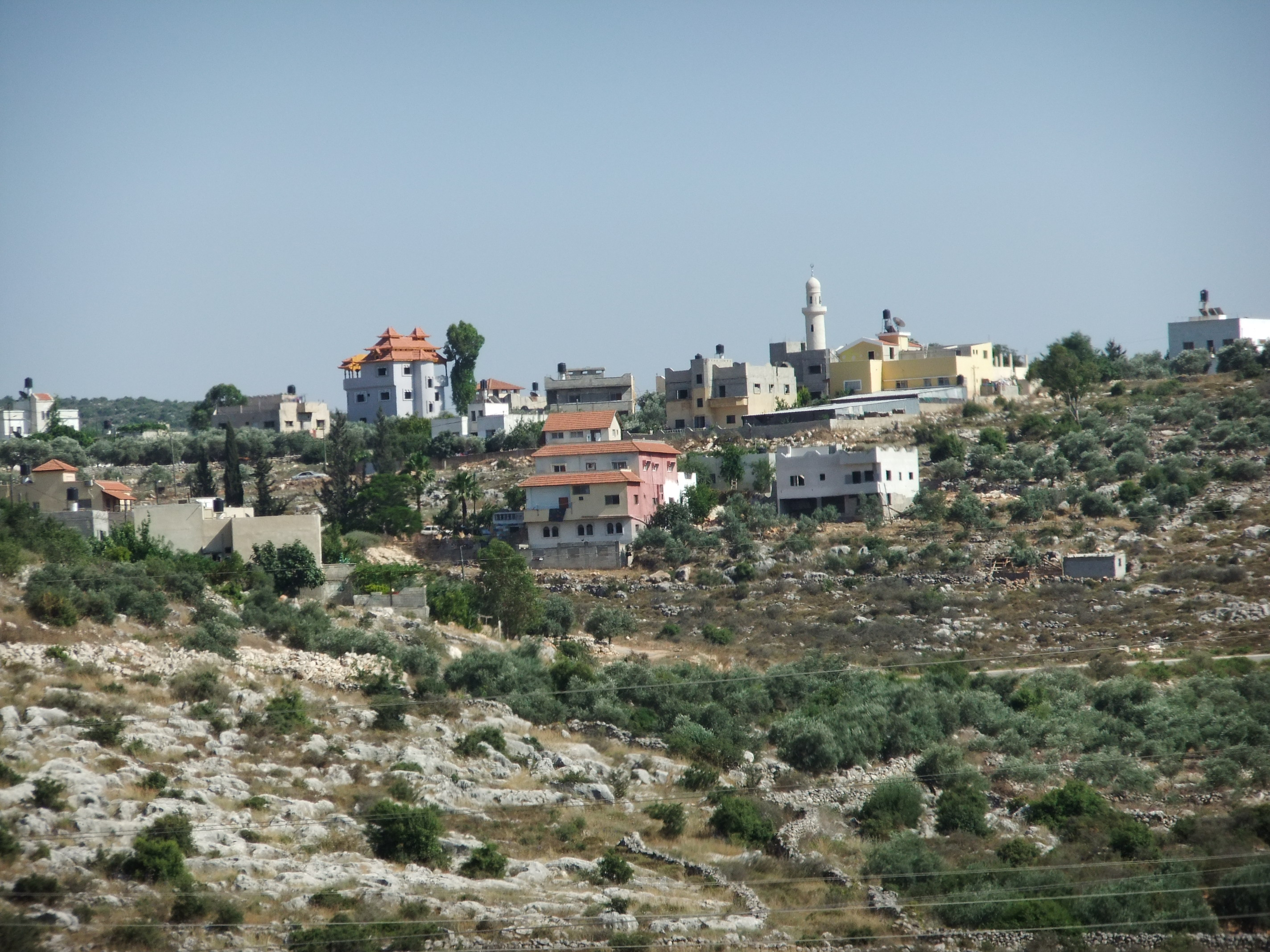

- Location of Bruqin within Palestine
- Coordinates: 32°04′16″N 35°05′58″E
- Palestine grid: 159/164
- State: State of Palestine
- Governorate: Salfit

Government
  - Type: Village council
  - Head of Municipality: Ekremah M. Samara

Area
  - Total: 13.2 km^{2} (5.1 sq mi)
- Elevation: 372 m (1,220 ft)

Population (2017)
  - Total: 4,047
  - Density: 307/km^{2} (794/sq mi)
- Name meaning: Berukin

Bruqin (Arabic: إبروقين) is a Palestinian town 13 kilometers west of Salfit in the Salfit Governorate of the State of Palestine, in the northern West Bank, adjacent to the Israeli settlement of Brukhin, which was built over lands confiscated from the Palestinian town. According to the Palestinian Central Bureau of Statistics, Bruqin had a population of 4,047 in 2017. The town used to be on a camel-trading route. There is evidence of Roman rule in the city due to the presence of three ancient pools and a tomb.

== Location ==
Bruqin is located 7.9 kilometers (4.9 mi) west of Salfit. It is bordered by Salfit and Farkha to the east, Qarawat Bani Zaid, Kafr 'Ein and Bani Zeid to the south, Kafr ad Dik to the west, and Haris and Sarta to the north.

== History ==
Bruqin is an ancient site. Here French explorer Victor Guérin found a large number of cut stones in the walls of modern houses, and an ancient tomb near the village with two sepulchral chambers.

Sherds from the Byzantine, Umayyad, Crusader/Ayyubid and Mamluk eras have been found here.

=== Ottoman era ===
The place appeared in 1596 Ottoman tax registers as Bruqin, being in the Nahiya of Jabal Qubal of the Liwa of Nablus. It had a population of 16 households, all Muslim. The villagers paid a fixed tax rate of 33.3% on wheat, barley, summer crops, olives, and goats or beehives, in addition for a press for olives or grapes; a total of 2,000 Akçe.

Bruqin appears in tax records from the years 1671 and 1832.

In the 18th and 19th centuries, the village formed part of the highland region known as Jūrat ‘Amra or Bilād Jammā‘īn. Situated between Dayr Ghassāna in the south and the present Route 5 in the north, and between Majdal Yābā in the west and Jammā‘īn, Mardā and Kifl Ḥāris in the east, this area served, according to historian Roy Marom, "as a buffer zone between the political-economic-social units of the Jerusalem and the Nablus regions. On the political level, it suffered from instability due to the migration of the Bedouin tribes and the constant competition among local clans for the right to collect taxes on behalf of the Ottoman authorities."

In 1838, Edward Robinson noted it as a village, Berukin, in the Jurat Merda district, south of Nablus.

In 1870, Victor Guérin estimated that the village had 300 inhabitants.

In 1870/1871 (1288 AH), an Ottoman census listed the village in the nahiya (sub-district) of Jamma'in al-Thani, subordinate to Nablus.

In 1882, PEF's Survey of Western Palestine, the village (called Berukin) was described as a "moderate-sized village on the end of a spur, with a steep slope to the valley beneath, in which are springs just below the houses. On the south are caves, on the north olives."

=== British Mandate era ===
In the 1922 census of Palestine conducted by the British Mandate authorities, Bruqin had a population of 367, all Muslims, increasing in the 1931 census to 534, again all Muslim, in a total of 90 houses.

In the 1945 statistics the population was 690, all Muslims, while the total land area was 12,628 dunams, according to an official land and population survey. Of this, 3,175 were allocated for plantations and irrigable land, 2,301 for cereals, while 28 dunams were classified as built-up areas.

=== Jordanian era ===
In the wake of the 1948 Arab–Israeli War, and after the 1949 Armistice Agreements, Bruqin came under Jordanian rule.

In 1961, the population was 1,141.

=== Post-1967 ===
Since the Six-Day War in 1967, Bruqin has been under Israeli occupation. Its villagers state that after 1987, the toxic output from Israeli industries located in settlement areas has produced chronic health problems for local Palestinians.

==== Occupation of village lands ====
After the 1995 accords, 8.4% of village land is defined as being in Area A, 35.8% in Area B, while the remainder 55.8% is in Area C. In 1981, Israel confiscated 684 dunams of village land for the Barqan Industrial Zone, and in 1990 confiscated 332 dunums of village land for the Israeli settlement of Bruchin.

In 2014 the Shomron Regional Council began work to develop a 25-acre farm on a hill just northwest of Bruqin, forming part of 110 acres belonging to the nearby Palestinian villages of Adiq and Biddya. Though Adiq is in Area A, under Palestinian jurisdiction, its village lands lie in Area C, where Palestinian construction is prohibited, and which Israel declared its state land in 1985. Access to the farmland is through Bruqin's land, which is planted with their olive groves. The apparent intent is to create territorial continuity between the Green line and the Israeli settlement of Ariel, via new settlements such as Leshem and Bruchin. According to Bruqin villages, use of the access road is illegal, and Israel is blocking the villages' own roads to Sarta.

==== Economy ====
Around 70% of working-age males were employed in Israel as laborers prior to the Second Intifada. Today, the unemployment rate is 80%. There is agricultural work it is seasonal. Around 150 out of 500 families are dependent on aid, from the Red Cross or the Social Affairs Ministry of the Palestinian National Authority. There are two mosques, a youth club and a gym in the town. There are also three schools in the town, including an all-girls school for grades 1 to 12, a boys primary and secondary school and a boys high school. For hospital care, residents travel to Ramallah, but for emergency treatment they go to nearby Salfit.

Bruqin depends primarily on agriculture to meet its basic needs. The town's total land area is 13,237 dunams, of which 1,336 dunams is built-up area. Around 1,200 dunams are planted with orchards, especially olive, about 3,000 dunams of land is used for shepherding while approximately 8,000 dunams are used for settlement purposes, including settlements and by-pass roads.

==== Government ====
Bruqin is governed by a municipal council, with elections scheduled to occur every four years.

== Demography ==
The main families of the town are Barakat, Sabra, Samara and Khater.

A number of its inhabitants have, in more recent times, originated from Deir Ghassana.

== Bibliography ==
- Barron, J.B., ed. (1923). Palestine: Report and General Abstracts of the Census of 1922. Government of Palestine.
- Conder, C.R.; Kitchener, H.H. (1882). The Survey of Western Palestine: Memoirs of the Topography, Orography, Hydrography, and Archaeology. Vol. 2. London: Committee of the Palestine Exploration Fund.
- Finkelstein, I.; Lederman, Zvi, eds. (1997). Highlands of many cultures. Tel Aviv: Institute of Archaeology of Tel Aviv University Publications Section. ISBN 965-440-007-3.
- Government of Jordan, Department of Statistics (1964). First Census of Population and Housing. Volume I: Final Tables; General Characteristics of the Population (PDF).
- Government of Palestine, Department of Statistics (1945). Village Statistics, April, 1945.
- Guérin, V. (1875). Description Géographique Historique et Archéologique de la Palestine (in French). Vol. 2: Samarie, pt. 2. Paris: L'Imprimerie Nationale.
- Hadawi, S. (1970). Village Statistics of 1945: A Classification of Land and Area ownership in Palestine. Palestine Liberation Organization Research Center.
- Hütteroth, W.-D.; Abdulfattah, K. (1977). Historical Geography of Palestine, Transjordan and Southern Syria in the Late 16th Century. Erlanger Geographische Arbeiten, Sonderband 5. Erlangen, Germany: Vorstand der Fränkischen Geographischen Gesellschaft. ISBN 3-920405-41-2.
- Mills, E., ed. (1932). Census of Palestine 1931. Population of Villages, Towns and Administrative Areas. Jerusalem: Government of Palestine.
- Palmer, E.H. (1881). The Survey of Western Palestine: Arabic and English Name Lists Collected During the Survey by Lieutenants Conder and Kitchener, R. E. Transliterated and Explained by E.H. Palmer. Committee of the Palestine Exploration Fund.
- Robinson, E.; Smith, E. (1841). Biblical Researches in Palestine, Mount Sinai and Arabia Petraea: A Journal of Travels in the year 1838. Vol. 3. Boston: Crocker & Brewster.
