= List of Philippine presidential firsts =

The following is a list of firsts attained by various presidents of the Philippines. Distinctions were achieved while at office unless otherwise stated.

== Emilio Aguinaldo (1899–1901) ==
- First president of the Philippines, officially recognized as such. (See also: List of unofficial presidents of the Philippines)
- First president to declare martial law (May 1898).
- First president to be a Freemason.
- First president to be a member of the military.
- First and only president to be below the age of 30.
- First president to live to the age of 90.
- First president who became a widower following the death of his first wife Hilaria on March 6, 1921.
- First president to remarry when he married María Agoncillo in 1930.
- First president from Luzon (Cavite).
- First president to outlive a successor upon the death of Manuel Quezon.
- First president to outlive more than one successor, namely Manuel Quezon, Jose Laurel, Sergio Osmeña, Manuel Roxas, Elpidio Quirino and Ramon Magsaysay.

== Manuel L. Quezon (1935–1944) ==
- First president to be a lawyer.
- First president from the province of Aurora, (Born in present day Baler, Aurora ).
- First president to have held the positions of councilor, provincial governor, representative, senator, and Senate president.
- First officially recognized president to be a member of a political party while in office.
- First president who is a member of the Nacionalista Party.
- First president to run against a former president. (Emilio Aguinaldo)
- First president to win the presidency by direct election. (1935)
- First president to ride an aircraft while in office.
- First president to use Filipino on the State of the Nation Address. (Mainly delivered in English, Quezon mentioned the word kasamas (tenants) in his 1936 State of the Nation Address.)
- First president to celebrate his 60th birthday while in office, turning 60 on August 19, 1938.
- First and only president to concurrently serve as mayor, serving as the acting mayor of the newly-established Quezon City in 1939.
- First president to have secured a second term in office. (1941)
- First president to concurrently serve as a department secretary (Secretary of National Defense).
- First president to die in office.
- First president to die outside the Philippines, dying in New York on August 1, 1944.
- First president to die before the age of 70 as he died at the age of 65.
- First president to meet a US president in the person of Pres. Franklin D. Roosevelt.
- First president to die before his predecessor.
- First president to be internationally recognized (Aguinaldo's First Philippine Republic was an unrecognized state).
- First president to be buried at the Manila North Cemetery (His remains were later exhumed from the cemetery in 1979 to be transferred to the Quezon Memorial Shrine).

== Jose P. Laurel (1943–1945) ==
- First president from Batangas.
- First president to have previously served in the Supreme Court of the Philippines as Associate Justice (1936–1942).
- First president to be a father to a vice president and a Speaker of the House of Representatives of the Philippines.
- First president to be elected to another government position in his post-presidency upon winning his second term in the Senate in 1951 (he first served in the Senate during the Philippine Commonwealth).
- First president whose term in office was first ruled unofficial and was legitimized later. He was recognized as a legitimate Philippine president during the administration of Diosdado Macapagal.
- First president to be buried outside Metro Manila. He was buried in his hometown of Tanauan, Batangas.

== Sergio Osmeña (1944–1946) ==
- First president from Visayas (Cebu).
- First president to have previously served as Speaker of the House of Representatives of the Philippines and president pro tempore of the Senate of the Philippines.
- First president to have held the position of vice president.
- First president to have assumed the presidency upon the death of his predecessor (Manuel L. Quezon).
- First president to be sworn in as president overseas (United States).
- First president to be defeated in a presidential election in his incumbency (1946).
- First and only president who is an illegitimate child.
- First president to have a child who also ran for president (Sergio Osmeña Jr. in the 1969 Philippine presidential election).

== Manuel Roxas (1946–1948) ==
- First president from Capiz.
- First president to have bolted from his original political party before his presidential election.
- First president to die before the age of 60. He died at the age of 56 on April 15, 1948.
- First president to have a descendant appointed as Secretary of the Interior and Local Government (Mar Roxas).
- First president who is a member of the Liberal Party.
- First president to have held three of the highest positions in the government, or the first one to have headed both legislative houses and the executive branch. He was a Senate president and a House Speaker before he became president.
- First president to die before more than one predecessors. Upon his death, his living predecessors are Emilio Aguinaldo, Sergio Osmeña and Jose Laurel.

== Elpidio Quirino (1948–1953) ==
- First president from Ilocos Sur.
- First Ilocano president.
- First president to have won a full term in office after completing the rest of his late predecessor's term.
- First president to meet the Pope while in office when he met Pope Pius XII on October 9, 1951.
- First president to be inaugurated at the Independence Grandstand (now known as Quirino Grandstand).
- First president to face an impeachment complaint in 1949 over the alleged usage of government funds in refurbishing the Malacañang Palace and alleged involvement in diamond smuggling.
- First president to deliver the State of the Nation Address through radio broadcast as he is in hospital confinement at Johns Hopkins Hospital due to medical problems.
- First president to be buried at the Manila South Cemetery (His remains were later exhumed from the cemetery in 2016 to be transferred to Libingan ng mga Bayani).
- First president whose remains were cremated. His remains were cremated after exhumation in 2016, 60 years after his death.

== Ramon Magsaysay (1953–1957) ==
- First president from Zambales.
- First president to take the oath of office wearing the barong tagalog.
- First president to swear on the Bible on his inauguration.
- First president to be born after the Spanish colonial era.
- First president to use a Campaign jingle.
- First president born in the 20th century.
- First president to die apart from natural causes as he was killed in an aircraft disaster.
- First president to die before reaching the age of 50. He died at the age of 49 on March 17, 1957.
- First president to have both living parents during his incumbency.
- First president to predecease his parents. His father died on January 24, 1969, at the age of 94, while his mother died on May 5, 1981, at the age of 95.

== Carlos P. Garcia (1957–1961) ==
- First president from Bohol.
- First president to have a vice president from a different political party (Diosdado Macapagal was from the Liberal Party).
- First president elected by a plurality of votes rather than a majority.
- First and only president to have only one child.
- First president who never had a son.
- First and only president to concurrently serve as Secretary of Foreign Affairs.
- First president to lie in state at the Manila Cathedral.
- First president to be buried at Libingan ng mga Bayani.

== Diosdado Macapagal (1961–1965) ==
- First president from Pampanga.
- First president to have a child who would later become president when his daughter Gloria assumed the presidency following the resignation of Joseph Estrada in 2001.
- First president to legitimize the presidency of a predecessor. Jose Laurel was only recognized as a legitimate president under his administration, some twenty years after.

== Ferdinand Marcos (1965–1986) ==
- First president from Ilocos Norte.
- First and only president to be elected for a second term in the post-war era (1969).
- First and only president to have been prime minister (1978–1981).
- First president to meet two Popes while in office, meeting with Popes Paul VI and John Paul II during their respective visits to the country (1970 and 1981).
- First president whose spouse would also run for president when his widow Imelda ran during the 1992 elections.
- First and only president to hold office for two decades (1965–1986).
- First president to switch political parties while in office. Marcos left Nacionalista to become an independent politician during his term in 1972; he would later establish Kilusang Bagong Lipunan in 1978.
- First president to have been ousted by popular revolt (People Power Revolution).
- First president to face a formal investigation for ill-gotten wealth and graft gained during their term.
- First president to falsely claim to be a distinguished war hero: Claims were discredited by released CIA documents and further investigations.

== Corazon Aquino (1986–1992) ==
- First female president of the Philippines.
- First president to have the presidential oath of office administered by an Associate Justice.
- First president to have not held any previous government position.
- First president from Tarlac.
- First president who is a member of PDP–Laban.
- First president to die in the 21st century.
- First president to be buried at Manila Memorial Park – Sucat.

== Fidel V. Ramos (1992–1998) ==
- First president to be a non-Catholic.
- First president to be a Protestant.
- First and only military official to hold every rank from Second Lieutenant to Commander-in-Chief.
- First and only president from Pangasinan.
- First president who is a Christian democrat.
- First president who is a member of Lakas–NUCD (later Lakas–CMD until its merger with KAMPI in 2009).
- First president to celebrate his 70th birthday while in office. He turned 70 on March 18, 1998, 3 months before the end of his term.
- First president to be elected after turning 60. He was elected in 1992 at the age of 64.
- First ever president who was a relative of a former president. His second cousin is Ferdinand Marcos who, in his tenure as president, appointed him as chief of Philippine Constabulary and chief of staff of Armed Forces of the Philippines.
- First president who finished his term for exact six years under the 1987 Constitution.
- First and only president to succumb to COVID-19 complications.
- First and only president to receive a state funeral in the 21st century.

== Joseph Estrada (1998–2001) ==
- First president that is left-handed.
- First president who is a former actor.
- First president who was born in Metro Manila.
- First and only president who is a member of Pwersa ng Masang Pilipino.
- First president to concurrently serve as Secretary of the Interior and Local Government.
- First and only president who has undergone an impeachment trial.
- First and only president to resign from office.
- First president to be elected mayor post-presidency. He served as Mayor of Manila from 2013 to 2019.
- First president to have served as Mayor in two cities. (San Juan, 1969–1986 and Manila, 2013–2019)
- First president whose wife was elected to the Senate. The former first lady Luisa became senator in 2001.
- First president to contract COVID-19. (His fourth successor, Bongbong Marcos, earlier contracted COVID-19 in 2020, two years before being elected president and one year before Estrada contracted the disease.)

== Gloria Macapagal Arroyo (2001–2010) ==
- First president born after the Commonwealth.
- First president to be born after World War II.
- First presidential child (and daughter) to become president. Her father was President Diosdado Macapagal.
- First president to be elected and inaugurated in the 21st century following the resignation of Joseph Estrada. She was later elected to a full term in May 2004.
- First and only president to have two vice presidents. Her first vice president is Teofisto Guingona whom she appointed months into her presidency, while her second vice president is Noli de Castro who was elected in 2004.
- First and only president to take her oath of office outside of Luzon. She had her second presidential inauguration in Cebu in 2004.
- First and only president to serve in Congress immediately after leaving office after being elected representative of the Second District of Pampanga.
- First president to become house speaker post-presidency in 2018.

== Benigno Aquino III (2010–2016) ==
- First and only president to be a bachelor and childless while in office.
- First presidential son to become president. His mother was President Corazon Aquino.
- First president to be elected after turning 50. He celebrated his 50th birthday on February 8, 2010, and was elected in May that year.
- First president to officially reside at Bahay Pangarap.
- First president to deliver the State of the Nation Address entirely in Filipino. (2010)
- First president who has served in the 21st century to be deceased.
- First president whose remains were cremated before initial burial.

== Rodrigo Duterte (2016–2022) ==
- First president from Mindanao (Davao).
- First president to be born in Leyte.
- First and only local chief executive (city mayor) to be elected president. (Aguinaldo held an office equivalent to town mayor at the start of the 1896 Revolution, and he was first elected president of a government in 1897, but his officially recognized tenure as the first president began in 1899).
- First septuagenarian president. He was elected to the presidency in May 2016 at the age of 71.
- First president to have marriage annulled. (Duterte was married to Elizabeth Abellana Zimmerman from 1973 to 2001. His current partner is Cielito “Honeylet” Avanceña).
- First and only president to visit Israel while in office.
- First and only president to not visit the United States while in office.
- First and only president to withdraw bid to run for another government position post-presidency. (2022 Senate election)
- First and only president to face an international tribunal and the first Asian leader to face a trial before the International Criminal Court.
- First and only president not to serve an elective post won after presidency. (Duterte was elected mayor of Davao City in 2025 but unable to take oath of office within a prescribed period due to detention.)

== Bongbong Marcos (2022–present) ==
- First and only president to win the presidency after losing in a vice presidential election. He lost the vice presidential election in May 2016.
- First and only president who is a namesake of a former president. His given name is Ferdinand (with the suffix Jr.), while he is the son of President Ferdinand Marcos. Also the first to have a former president parent with the same gender.
- First president to be elected by a majority in a presidential election since the establishment of the Fifth Republic in 1986, the year when his father left the presidency due to People Power Revolution.
- First and only president to have a mother witness the inauguration of both her husband and son as president, respectively. His mother Imelda is a former first lady and the wife of President Ferdinand Marcos.
- First and only president to be a YouTube vlogger before his election as president.
- First and only president who has previously served as a vice governor. He served as vice governor of Ilocos Norte from 1980 to 1983.
- First and only president who is a member of Partido Federal ng Pilipinas.
- First and only president to concurrently serve as Secretary of Agriculture.
- First and only president to attend a coronation of a monarch of the United Kingdom. (Coronation of Charles III and Camilla)
- First and only president to set foot at the United States Indo-Pacific Command headquarters in Hawaii.
- First and only president to address the joint session of the Parliament of Australia, and the 17th head of state and government overall, to do so.
- First and only president to address the Shangri-La Dialogue in Singapore. (as a keynote speaker)

== See also ==
- List of United States presidential firsts
