= Batya Ouziel =

Israeli handicrafter and television presenter (1934–2018)

- בתיה עוזיאל
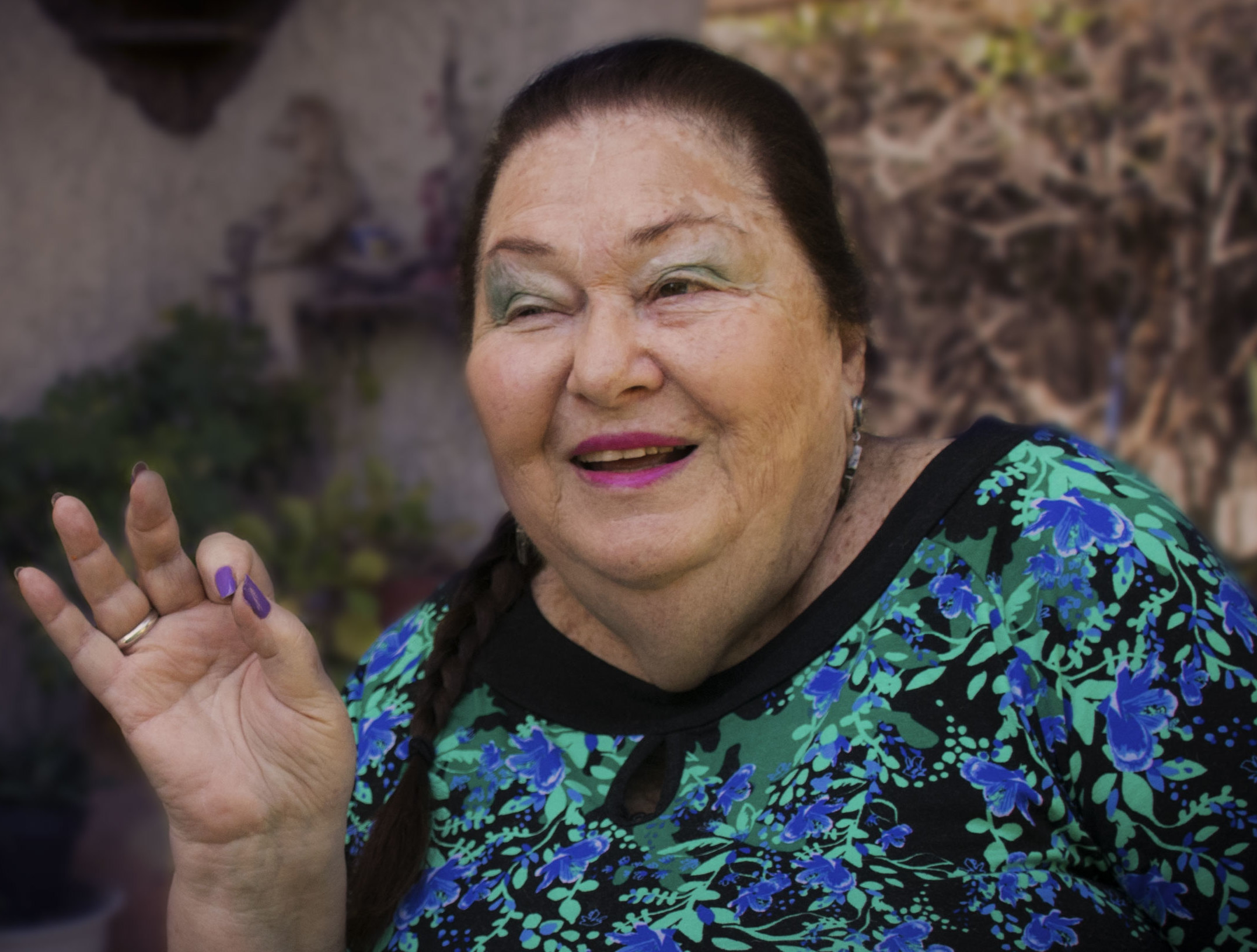
- Born: 1 March 1934; Tel Aviv, British Mandate of Palestine
- Died: 6 January 2018 (aged 83); Tel Aviv, Israel
- Occupations: Handicraft; Television presenter
- Years active: 1956–mid-2010s
- Spouse: Shmuel Ouziel (died)
- Children: 2

Batya Ouziel (Hebrew: בתיה עוזיאל; 1 March 1934 – 6 January 2018) was an Israeli handicrafter and television presenter. She learnt the crafts of embroidery and knitting beginning at an early age and began doing this while serving under instructors from the Gadna in the Israel Defense Forces (IDF). Ouziel taught art and art history in educational institutes and became well known in Israel for broadcasting a weekly section called In Four Hands with Batya Ouziel about handicrafts over the radio in the 1960s. She broadened her reach when she presented approximately 300 editions of the educational television programme Crafts with Batya Ouziel between 1974 and 1982.

== Early life ==
Ouziel was born in Tel Aviv on 1 March 1934. She was the daughter of Baruch Gilon who directed, promoted and organised the Broom Theater; her mother Sonia (who died after being run over by a British lorry in 1941) was an agronomist by training. When Tel Aviv began to be bombed by the Italians during the Second World War, Ouziel and her family relocated to Kfar Malal. Her father subsequently sent her to live in Geva for three starting when she was nine years old. Ouziel was unable to assimilate well in the city's elite society of the mid-1940s. She frequently suffered from migraines and disliked the treatment she received from the locals.

Ouziel returned to Tel Aviv when her father remarried; she continued her education at New High School. She was drawn to embroidery and knitting from an early age, and was educated first at the Histadrut's Painting and Sculpture Studio in Tel Aviv from 1950 to 1951 and then at the Painting Teachers' College in the same city in 1954. While Ouziel was serving in the military, she learnt these crafts when she served under instructors from the Gadna in the Israel Defense Forces (IDF), and began advertising herself as a waste exploiter during military service. She served in the military from 1954 to 1956.

== Career ==
Following the end of her military service, Ouziel went into teaching art in schools. From 1956 to 1961, she taught painting and art history at schools in Ramat Gan and the Tel Aviv-Yafo Municipality and also did teaching of methodology and painting at IDF seminars between 1957 and 1959. She also taught paint and art history at Tel Aviv-Yafo's 11th Urban High School between 1956 and 1970. Ouziel went to become coordinator of the Department of Art at the Eleventh Urban High School in Tel Aviv-Yafo from 1971 to 1980. She became well-known in Israel during the 1960s. Ouziel had a weekly section called In Four Hands with Batya Ouziel about handicrafts on the Arabic-language radio programme Israel Housewives presented by Rivka Michaeli.

From 1974 to 1982, she became better known when she appeared on approximately 300 editions of the educational television programme Crafts with Batya Ouziel which were compiled into 12-volume books. Most episodes of the programme were erased and only 25 remain in existence. Ouziel was paid little for her appearances since executives did not value the ratings she received. She coined the phrase "I prepared in advance" which was her common expression and made her identifiable. Ouziel often uttered the words during the programme to inform viewers before the presentation of the finishing work. She explained the phrase came from her home which was quite strict about language with the words "prepared" and "understood" often used by her father. In the 1980s, she lost a court case against the Israeli tax authorities when it ruled because her works had the mechanisms of a watch, she needed to pay a tax similar to watch sellers.

In 2000, Ouziel received a telephone call from an advertising agency producer offering her a role to advertise for a diary company. She accepted and ended up doing an advertisement for a cottage. Around the same time, Ouziel and her young granddaughter took part in the Hope Channel pre-school creative television programme Grandma Batya. In 2013, a tribute exhibition to her featuring some of her works called I prepared in retrospect – a tribute exhibition to Batya Ouziel was held at the Gerstein Gallery. That same year, Ouziel did a workshop at the ecological festival The Ball in Our Hands at the Ashkelon National Park in Ashkelon. She continued to teach craft privately to students, and appeared on a sketch on the television programme The Jews are Coming.

== Personal life ==
She was married to the banker Shmuel Ouziel until his death in 2008. Ouziel had a son and a daughter who died unexpectedly of a serious illness at the age of 24. On the evening of 6 January 2018, she died of cancer at Ichilov Hospital in Tel Aviv. Students at the Talpiot College of Education paid tribute to Ouziel.

Her husband's grandfather's brother was the first chief rabbi of Israel, Ben-Zion Meir Hai Uziel.

== Legacy ==
Ran Boker and Ami Friedman of Ynet described Ouziel as becoming "synonymous with handicrafts made of improvised materials and the "do-it-yourself" priesthood." Mako calls her "a cultural and memory icon of childhood that warms the hearts of an entire generation in Israel."
