= Barkan Industrial Park =

Israeli industrial park in the West Bank

Barkan Industrial Park איזור התעשיה ברקן
- industrial park
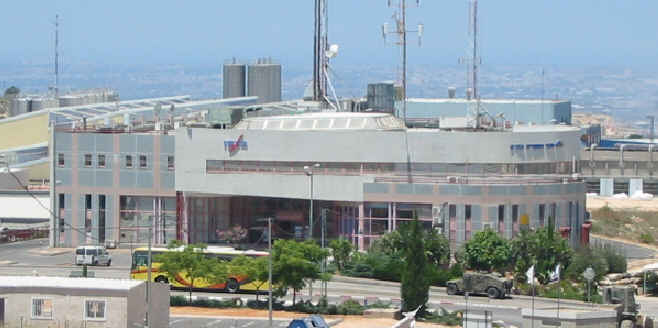

- Location within the Northern West Bank
- Coordinates: 32°6′24″N 35°07′2″E
- Council: Shomron
- Founded: 1982

The Barkan Industrial Park (Hebrew: איזור התעשיה ברקן, lit. Barkan Industrial Area) is located about 25 kilometres east of Tel Aviv in the West Bank. Its offices are located at the northern entrance. The industrial park is located adjacent to the Israeli settlement Barkan and near the settlement and city of Ariel.

A January 2016 report by Human Rights Watch called for companies to pull out from the West Bank since the study says that these companies, including Barkan Industrial Park, violate international law by harming the rights of the Palestinians. However, some Israelis contend that the industrial zone is a major source of employment for Palestinian workers.

The international community considers Israeli settlements in the West Bank illegal under international law, but the Israeli government disputes this.

== Pollution ==
It is reported that many highly polluting factories from Israel moved into settlement industrial zones like Barkan to profit from the relative lack of environmental regulations there.

In 1998 Barkan factories generated an estimated 810,000 cubic meters of industrial wastewater, which flowed untreated from the three storage tanks, after a design defect made them nonoperational when overloaded, into a nearby wadi into the agricultural lands of the Palestinian villages of Sarta, Kafr ad-Dik and Bruqin, and reportedly polluting the groundwater with heavy metals. According to the Palestinian Ministry of Health roughly 70% of cancers among Palestinians in the contiguous Salfit Governorate occur among people living near the industrial park and exposed to the waste overflow.

== History ==
Founded in 1982, in order to strengthen the Jewish presence in the West Bank, the industrial park currently includes about 120 businesses and factories manufacturing plastics, metal-work, food, textiles, and more, with a workforce of 20,000, half of whom are Palestinians.

According to Suleiman Shamlawi, from the nearby village of Haris, large parts of the Barkan industrial plant are built over 215 dunams (22 hectares) of land belonging to his family, which the IDF confiscated in 1981 on the grounds it was not registered as private property in 1967. Shamlawi states that, while this is true, records of his tax payments to the Jordanian authorities prove that the family paid its taxes on the land to the Jordanian governing authority down to 1967. The case was argued before the Supreme Court of Israel which ruled that the Shamlawi family had proven its ownership, and was entitled to register its land with Israel. In 2006, a settler organization produced a contract of sale dating back to 1963 claiming it showed that another Palestinian family had purchased the terrain from the Shamlawis, and that it was later resold to settlers, a sale document the Shamlawis dismiss as a forgery. Israel's Supreme Court held that Suleiman had sufficiently proved his ownership and could register the land with the Israeli authorities. In 2007, the Israeli Military's Committee for Initial Land Registration rejected the settler's claim that they could register it in their title as lacking credibility, but then confiscated 170 dunams of the Shamlawi land on which Barkan industrial plants had already been constructed. In 2014, in partial recognition of the Shamlawi claims, Israel ruled that 42 dunams of the Barkan industrial estate not yet built on could be registered in Suleiman Shalùmlawi's name.

== Israeli-Palestinian conflict ==
The Israeli government subsidizes companies setting up in West Bank industrial zones, where the rent and tax rates are much lower than in Israel. A minimal initial investment benefit is passed on to such businesses, together with a package of benefits that favour settlement industrial zones. In Barkan (2012) rent averaged 24/ 27 shekels per square metre, as opposed to the Israeli rate of 43 shekels in industrial zones in Caesarea and Rosh Ha'Ayin, and the rates on Barkan land amount to 47 shekels per square meter, compared to 100 shekels in Rosh Ha'Ayin.

At Barkan Industrial Park thousands of Israelis and Palestinians work in many of the factories.

Numerous Israeli authorities have stated that Barkan is a showcase example of the benefits of Israeli-Palestinian cooperation. According to the settlers own council: the good relationships are evident from the fact in all the years since the beginning of the First Intifada, Barkan operated completely undisturbed. Former Samaria Regional Council head Gershon Mesika said -

It's amazing how the radical Left fails to understand that the main victims are the Palestinians themselves ... Fortunately, so far these boycotts have been nothing but PR maneuvers, and we are sure that Jews and Arabs will continue to work together and strengthen our prosperous industry and live in coexistence

Human Rights Watch says that such "rosey sentiments ignore the deeply discriminatory environment in which settlement businesses operate, and Palestinian workers' vulnerability to abuse."

Israel's Barkan entrepreneurs hail the arrangement as contributing to the Palestinian economy, while numerous reports from Israeli and Palestinian NGOs and trade unions cite workers' testimonies claiming that labour rights abuse and exploitive practices exist. Barkan's own website asserts that one of the functions of its industrial development is to enable further Israeli immigration into the occupied Palestinian territories.

Palestinian workers are said to start on a minimum wage but can rise to earn more than three times the average salary in areas governed by the Palestinian Authority. Though factories generally comply with the 2007 Israeli Supreme Court ruling that required employers to provide the same salaries, benefits and conditions to all employees, Palestinians as well as Israelis. At smaller factories, abuses have been reported. According to Kav LaOved, an Israeli workers' right organization, Palestinian workers in the Barkan Industrial zone (2009) receive salaries that are less than a third of that established as Israel's minimum wage, and they do not receive pay slips, vacations, sick pay, overtime or convalescence payments. In addition Kav LaOved claims most workers earn from $2 to $4 per hour compared with $5.75 for Israelis.

According to Israeli organisation Palestinian Media Watch, an article published on Al-Hayat Al-Jadida, the Palestinian Authority's official daily, praises Israeli treatment of Palestinian workers. With having added benefits such as transportation, medical and pensions, Palestinians are quick to leave their Palestinian employers and work for Israelis, whenever they have the opportunity to do so. Safety rules are enforced strictly by Israeli Workers' Union and physical examinations are done by doctors. Samaritans from Nablus were drawn to work in places like Barkan because they can obtain Israeli citizenship and earn standard Israeli wages.

=== Effects on the Palestinian economy ===
It is one of 15 industrial zones set up in the West Bank, providing jobs to Palestinians, and money to their economy, while occupying vast amounts of land that the Palestinians see as part of their future state. A 2007 Israeli Supreme Court judgement obliges Palestinians hired by such plants to receive the same salaries, benefits and conditions as Israelis. According to Diana Buttu, while industrial zones like Barkan supply important jobs to Palestinian workers, their existence challenges Palestinian aspirations for an independent state. Mohammed Mustafa, the Palestinian deputy prime minister for economic affairs, has labelled such industrial parks a form of "business colonization". By 1998, it extended over 150 dunams (37 acres) and since has expanded to cover over 1,300 dunams (about 325 acres) (2013).

=== BDS pressure and legislative action ===
Up to 80% of the Barkan plants' products are exported, and increasingly subject to threats in Europe of bans on products produced by Israeli industries in the West Bank. Factory owners there say that calls to boycott some factories endanger employment for many Palestinians. According to Mohammad Chaichian, the practice of industrial zones like Barkan in the West Bank gives Palestinians, for whom work permits in Israel are restricted, no option but to accept work in what he calls "Economic prison zones".

By 2008 the park's industries were affected by rising pressure in Europe, from the Boycott, Divestment and Sanctions movement, for companies to withdraw their involvement in the park. The partly Dutch owned Barkan Wine Cellars drew up stakes there and moved its facilities to kibbutz Hulda. In October 2008, following the Dutch lead, the Swedish company Assa Abloy, responding in turn to appeals from the Church of Sweden and other groups, announced that it would move its production plant belonging to their Israeli subsidiary Mul-T-Lock from Barkan, and relocate inside Israel.
