= Timeline of the Israeli–Palestinian conflict in 2018 =

The following is a timeline of events during the Israeli–Palestinian conflict in 2018.

== January ==
=== 4 January ===
- A 17-year-old Palestinian near Ramallah was killed during what IDF sources described as a violent riot in Deir Nidham.

=== 9 January ===
- A volunteer medic resident and Rabbi of Havat Gilad, Raziel Shevach, was shot dead by an unidentified assailant while driving his vehicle near his home on Route 60 in the West Bank.

=== 11 January ===
- A Palestinian was shot dead near Gaza's border fence, reportedly during a protest against the US recognition of Jerusalem as Israel's capital.
- A Palestinian was killed between the villages of Iraq Burin and Til in northern West Bank after Israeli troops reported they were under attack from a "massive barrage of rocks."

=== 15 January ===
- Israeli troops shot dead a 24-year-old Palestinian during clashes that broke out near the West Bank city of Qalqilya.

=== 18 January ===
- Israeli soldiers killed a Palestinian militant and captured another one in Jenin, saying they were part of the Hamas cell that killed rabbi Shevach the week before.

== February ==
=== 4 February ===
- A 19-year-old Palestinian was killed and four others were injured during clashes in the Wadi Burqin neighborhood of Jenin as part of the ongoing search for the terror cell leader that killed rabbi Shevach.

=== 5 February ===
- An Israeli man was stabbed to death in a terror attack at a bus station outside the West Bank settlement of Ariel.

=== 6 February ===
- During an Israeli raid in the village of Yamun near Jenin, the main operative responsible for the murder of Rabbi Shevach was killed, and his house was demolished. According to a Shin Bet investigation, the cell he headed was planning to carry out additional attacks.
- During clashes between Israeli forces and Palestinian rioters in the city of Nablus, the Palestinian Health Ministry reported that one Palestinian was killed and 110 were injured, six of them critically, as IDF soldiers were on a manhunt for Abed al-Karim Adel Asi, suspected of killing an Israeli man outside the settlement of Ariel the day before.

=== 7 February ===
- An Israeli civilian was lightly wounded in a stabbing attack in the West Bank settlement of Karmei Tzur north of Hebron. Another security guard who was present at the scene shot the assailant dead.

=== 16 February ===
- A 19-year-old Palestinian was shot during a protest near the Gaza perimeter fence and died five days later.

=== 18 February ===
- Israeli tank fire killed two Palestinian teenagers in Gaza during attacks against 18 targets belonging to militant groups in response to an explosion that wounded four Israeli soldiers.

=== 22 February ===
- A Palestinian man was shot dead in Jericho after running at Israeli soldiers with a metal object.

=== 25 February ===
- A Palestinian was killed when the Israeli navy fired on the boat he and two others were sailing in after the boat ignored warnings and strayed from a permitted fishing area in northern Gaza.

== March ==
=== 3 March ===
- A 59-year-old Palestinian farmer was shot dead when he approached the perimeter fence of Israel's border.

=== 4 March ===
- Three Israelis were lightly injured after a car ramming attack in Acre.

=== 9 March ===
- A 24-year-old Palestinian was killed in Hebron and many others were injured in clashes with Israeli forces. According to Palestinian sources, the victim was severely handicapped, while the Israeli army stated he was holding a firebomb.

=== 10 March ===
- A 19-year-old Palestinian was killed during clashes between Palestinians and Israeli settlers in the West Bank.

=== 16 March ===
- At least two Israeli soldiers were killed and two injured in the West Bank after a Palestinian drove his vehicle into them. The attacker sustained light injuries.

=== 18 March ===
- A 32-year old Israeli man was fatally stabbed by a Palestinian in Jerusalem's Old City. The attacker was shot dead by a nearby police officer.

=== 30 March ===
- During the 2018 Land Day protests that began on 30 March, at least 32 Palestinians were killed and thousands were injured during clashes with Israeli troops at the Gaza-Israel border.

== October ==
=== 12 October ===
Aisha al-Rabi, 48, was killed by a group of Israeli settlers who threw stones at the car she was traveling in. At about 9:30 pm she and her family were on their way home to Bidya, Salfit Governorate in the northwestern West Bank. They slowed down as they were about to approach a permanent Israeli checkpoint in the area. At that point, a group of settlers began hurling rocks at their car. One rock smashed through the car and hit Aisha on the right side of her face, crushing her skull. Her husband, Yaqoub, drove to the hospital in Nablus, a 20 minutes drive away, where his wife was pronounced dead.

== November ==
=== 11 November ===
Violence flared up again on 11 November 2018 when seven Palestinian militants were killed during a botched raid by the Israel Defense Forces in the southeastern Gaza Strip. One IDF officer was killed and another was injured. Over a dozen rockets were subsequently fired from Gaza, three of which were shot down. After a series of intense fire exchanges, ceasefire was agreed upon on 13 November 2018

=== 15 November ===
A Palestinian wielding a knife snuck into a police station in Jerusalem and lightly wounded four officers before he himself was shot and apprehended.

== December ==
=== 4 December ===
Mohammad Hossam Abdel Latif Habali, a 22 year old mentally disabled Palestinian, was shot and killed by Israeli soldiers on 4 December 2018 in Tulkarm, a city in the West Bank, near the border between Israel and the West Bank. Witnesses report that Habali was killed by Israeli forces, and the IDF has not disputed the cause of death.

== See also ==
- List of Israeli price tag attacks
- Palestinian rocket attacks on Israel
- List of Palestinian rocket attacks on Israel, 2018
- Aed Abu Amro
