= Sarta =

- Municipality type D (Village council)

Arabic transcription(s)
  - Arabic: سرطه
  - Latin: Sarta (official)
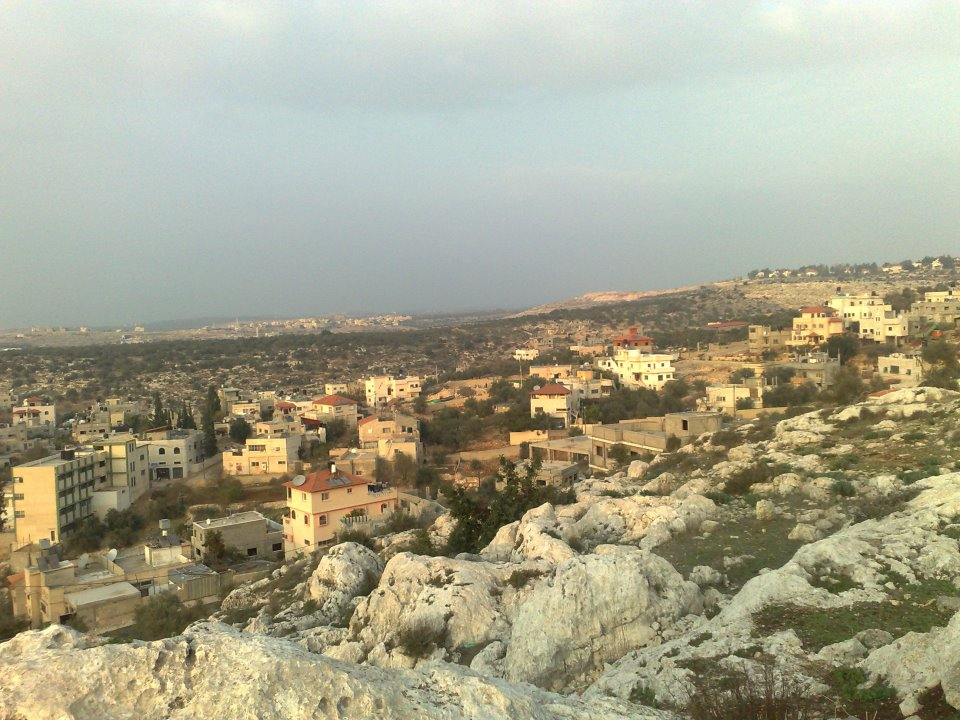
- Sarta village, 2014

- Location of Sarta within Palestine
- Coordinates: 32°06′15″N 35°05′25″E
- Palestine grid: 158/167
- State: State of Palestine
- Governorate: Salfit

Government
  - Type: Village council
- Elevation: 376 m (1,234 ft)

Population (2017)
  - Total: 3,382
- Name meaning: Serta

Sarta (Arabic: سرطه) is a Palestinian town in the Salfit Governorate in the northern West Bank, 22 kilometers southwest of Nablus. According to the Palestinian Central Bureau of Statistics, it had a population of approximately 3,382 in 2017.

== Location ==
Sarta is bordered by Haris to the east, Bruqin to the south, Biddya to the west, and Qarawat Bani Hassan to the north.

== History ==
Sarta is on an ancient site, where cisterns and columbariums carved into rock have been found. Sherds from Iron Age II and Persian eras have been found, but were possibly washed down from a nearby higher Tell. Sherds from Byzantine/Early Umayyad and Crusader/Ayyubid occupations can be suggested according to the finds of sherds at Sarta, and according to finds at the site of the nearby sheikh tomb.

Yakut mentions "Suratah", as being in "a village in Jabal Nabulus". It has been suggested that this was Sarta.

=== Ottoman era ===
The village was incorporated into the Ottoman Empire in 1517 with all of Palestine, and in 1596 it appeared in the tax registers as being in the nahiya of Jabal Qubal in the liwa of Nablus. It had a population of 6 households, all Muslim. They paid a fixed tax-rate of 33.3% on agricultural products, including wheat, barley, summer crops, olive trees, goats and beehives; a total of 1,500 akçe.

In the 18th and 19th centuries, Sarta formed part of the highland region known as Jūrat ‘Amra or Bilād Jammā‘īn. Situated between Dayr Ghassāna in the south and the present Route 5 in the north, and between Majdal Yābā in the west and Jammā‘īn, Mardā and Kifl Ḥāris in the east, this area served, according to historian Roy Marom, "as a buffer zone between the political-economic-social units of the Jerusalem and the Nablus regions. On the political level, it suffered from instability due to the migration of the Bedouin tribes and the constant competition among local clans for the right to collect taxes on behalf of the Ottoman authorities."

In 1838 it was noted as a village Serata, part of the Jurat Merda district, south of Nablus.

French explorer Victor Guérin travelled through the village in 1870, and found it to have around 40 houses, some better built than in the average village. The stones of the houses were alternately red and white. Several ancient cisterns dug into the rock provided water for the residents.

In 1870/1871 (1288 AH), an Ottoman census listed the village with a population of 27 households in the nahiya (sub-district) of Jamma'in al-Awwal, subordinate to Nablus.

In 1882, the Palestine Exploration Fund's "Survey of Western Palestine" described Serta as a small stone village.

=== British Mandate era ===
In the 1922 census of Palestine conducted by the British Mandate authorities, Sarta had a population of 275 Muslims and 1 Jew, increasing in the 1931 census to 317, all Muslim, in a total of 76 houses.

In the 1945 statistics the population was 420, all Muslims, while the total land area was 5,584 dunams, according to an official land and population survey. Of this, 1,858 were used for plantations and irrigable land, 766 for cereals, while 23 dunams were classified as built-up areas.

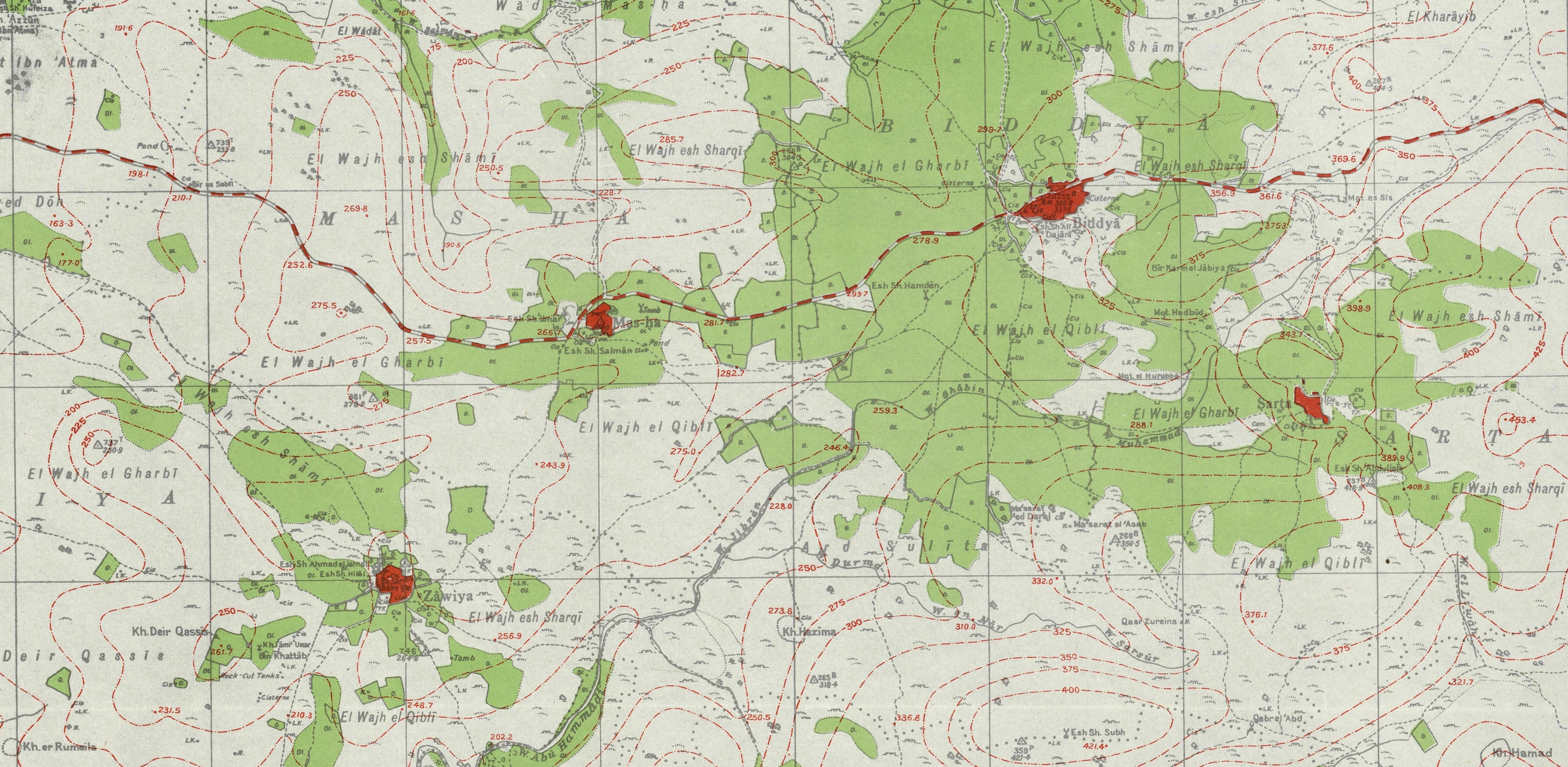
Sarta 1941 1:20,000

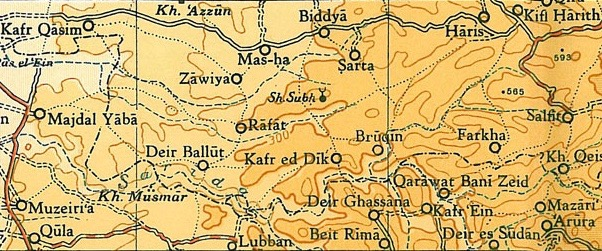
Sarta 1945 1:250,000

=== Jordanian era ===
In the wake of the 1948 Arab–Israeli War, and after the 1949 Armistice Agreements, Sarta came under Jordanian rule.

In 1961, the population was 740.

=== Post-1967 ===
Since the Six-Day War in 1967, Sarta has been under Israeli occupation.

After the 1995 accords, 16.8% of the village land is defined as Area B, while the remainder 83.2% is Area C. Israel has confiscated 353 dunams of village land for the establishment of the Israeli settlement of Barkan.

== Bibliography ==
- Barron, J.B., ed. (1923). Palestine: Report and General Abstracts of the Census of 1922. Government of Palestine.
- Conder, C.R.; Kitchener, H.H. (1882). The Survey of Western Palestine: Memoirs of the Topography, Orography, Hydrography, and Archaeology. Vol. 2. London: Committee of the Palestine Exploration Fund.
- Dauphin, C. (1998). La Palestine byzantine, Peuplement et Populations. BAR International Series 726 (in French). Vol. III : Catalogue. Oxford: Archeopress. ISBN 0-860549-05-4.
- Finkelstein, I.; Lederman, Zvi, eds. (1997). Highlands of many cultures. Tel Aviv: Institute of Archaeology of Tel Aviv University Publications Section. ISBN 965-440-007-3.
- Government of Jordan, Department of Statistics (1964). First Census of Population and Housing. Volume I: Final Tables; General Characteristics of the Population (PDF).
- Government of Palestine, Department of Statistics (1945). Village Statistics, April, 1945.
- Guérin, V. (1875). Description Géographique Historique et Archéologique de la Palestine (in French). Vol. 2: Samarie, pt. 2. Paris: L'Imprimerie Nationale.
- Hadawi, S. (1970). Village Statistics of 1945: A Classification of Land and Area ownership in Palestine. Palestine Liberation Organization Research Center.
- Hütteroth, W.-D.; Abdulfattah, K. (1977). Historical Geography of Palestine, Transjordan and Southern Syria in the Late 16th Century. Erlanger Geographische Arbeiten, Sonderband 5. Erlangen, Germany: Vorstand der Fränkischen Geographischen Gesellschaft. ISBN 3-920405-41-2.
- Le Strange, G. (1890). Palestine Under the Moslems: A Description of Syria and the Holy Land from A.D. 650 to 1500. Committee of the Palestine Exploration Fund.
- Mills, E., ed. (1932). Census of Palestine 1931. Population of Villages, Towns and Administrative Areas. Jerusalem: Government of Palestine.
- Palmer, E.H. (1881). The Survey of Western Palestine: Arabic and English Name Lists Collected During the Survey by Lieutenants Conder and Kitchener, R. E. Transliterated and Explained by E.H. Palmer. Committee of the Palestine Exploration Fund.
- Robinson, E.; Smith, E. (1841). Biblical Researches in Palestine, Mount Sinai and Arabia Petraea: A Journal of Travels in the year 1838. Vol. 3. Boston: Crocker & Brewster.
