= Murder of Itamar Ben Gal =

2018 stabbing attack on civilians in Ariel, West Bank

- Part of the Israeli–Palestinian conflict
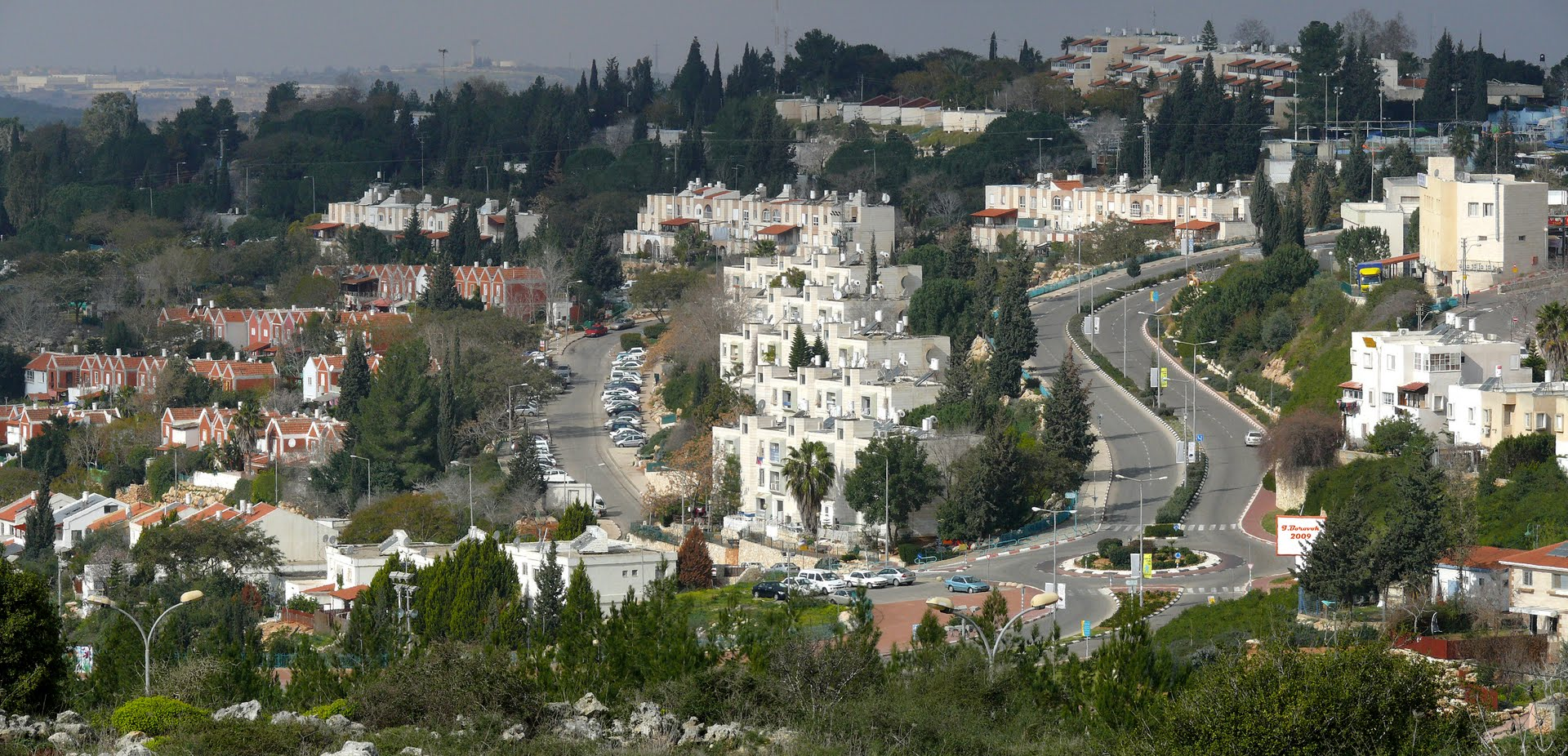
- Ariel, where the attack took place

- The attack site
- Native name: הפיגוע בצומת אריאל (2018)
- Location: 32°06′25″N 35°09′54″E; Ariel, West Bank
- Date: 5 February 2018; 8 years ago c. 10:45 am (UTC+2)
- Attack type: Stabbing
- Weapon: Knife
- Deaths: 1 civilian (+1 during clashes)
- Victim: Itamar Ben Gal
- Assailant: Abed al-Karim Adel Assi
- Motive: Anti-semitism

On 5 February 2018, 29-year-old rabbi Itamar Ben Gal (Hebrew: איתמר בן גל) from Har Brakha, was stabbed to death at the Ariel Junction, near the West Bank Israeli settlement and city of Ariel. The assailant had escaped from the scene, but was arrested following a six-week manhunt. A protester was killed during a violent demonstration against searching for the suspect.

== Incident ==
The attack occurred at a bus stop at the Ariel Junction, on Highway 5. On 5 February 2018, a rabbi was attacked by a man who fatally stabbed him multiple times in the upper body.

The perpetrator is said to have decided to kill a Jew during an argument with a policeman at a road junction near Ariel. He purchased two knives, each 27-centimeters-long, at a store in Nablus, and returned to the junction. There, he identified Rabbi Ben Gal as a Jew due to the fact that he was wearing a kippah. He attacked Ben Gal, and gave chase when Ben Gal ran away. The perpetrator was stopped from pursuing his victim when he was struck by a passing car.

== Perpetrator ==
Abed al-Karim Adel Assi (alt. Abd al-Hakim Asi), a 19 year-old Israeli Arab resident of Jaffa, was behind the attack. His parents are separated. Assis' father lives in Nablus; his mother lives in Haifa. Assis is known to have resided at one time in a home for at-risk youth and to have received social services aid over the years.

== Manhunt ==
During the manhunt for Assi, there were clashes between Israeli forces and Palestinian rioters in the city of Nablus, and the Palestinian Health Ministry reported that a Palestinian man, Khaled Tayeh, died.

The six-week manhunt ended with capture of the perpetrator.

== Legal proceedings ==
Assi was indicted for murder and charged with selecting his victim because he was a Jew. He was convicted.

== See also ==
- List of terrorist incidents in February 2018
- List of violent incidents in the Israeli–Palestinian conflict, 2018
- The murder of Israeli rabbi Raziel Shevah, a 35-year-old father of six killed in a drive by shooting in Havat Gilad, West Bank on January 9, 2018
