= List of Palestinian rocket attacks on Israel in 2018 =

This is a detailed list of Palestinian rocket and mortar attacks on Israel in 2018. All of the attacks originated in the Gaza Strip, unless stated otherwise. For information pertaining to the wider conflict, see Arab–Israeli conflict and Israeli–Palestinian conflict. This list does not include reports of deaths and injuries caused by Hamas rocket and mortar attacks that fell within Gaza.

In August 2014, Operation Protective Edge was ended after 4,594 rockets and mortars launched toward Israel. From the end of the operation came into force an unofficial cease-fire between Israel and Hamas.

== January ==
January 1

Around 9pm, two rockets were fired from Gaza at Israel. One fell short in Gaza, The other in an open area in the Eshkol Regional Council.

January 3

Between 2pm and 9pm, four rockets were fired from Gaza at Israel. They all both landed in open areas in the Eshkol Regional Council.

== February ==
February 2

At exactly 12am, one rocket was fired from Gaza at Israel. The IDF did not confirm if it landed within Israeli territory.

Around 9pm, one rocket was fired from Gaza at Israel. It landed in an open area in the Eshkol Regional Council.

February 17

Around 9pm, Multiple rockets were fired from Gaza at Israel. One landed on a house in Sha'ar HaNegev Regional Council.

February 18

Around 10pm, one rocket was fired from Gaza at Israel. It landed in an open area in the Sha'ar HaNegev Regional Council.

== May ==
May 29

On May 29, there were 70 rockets and mortars fired at Israel.

== June ==
June 3

On June 3, 3 rockets were fired into southern Israel from Gaza the rockets were intercepted by Iron Dome.

June 18

On June 18, 3 rockets were fired into Israel from Gaza.

June 20

On June 20, 45 rockets were fired into Israel from Gaza.

June 27

On June 27, 13 rockets were fired into Israel from Gaza. 3 were intercepted by Iron Dome.

== July ==
July 14

On July 14, 174 rockets or mortar shells were fired into Israel from Gaza. 30 were intercepted by Iron Dome.

== August ==
August 8

On August 8, 8 rockets were fired at Israel, 2 were intercepted, 4 impacted open areas, and 2 landed in Sderot causing damage and 2 injuries.

== November ==
November 11

On November 11, 17 rockets were fired at Israel, of which 3 were intercepted.

November 12

On November 12, a mortar fired from Gaza hit an Israeli bus, critically wounding a 19-year-old man.
