= List of massacres in Libya =

The following is a list of massacres that have occurred in Libya (numbers may be approximate):

Name	Date	Location	Deaths	Notes
Al-Jawazi tribe massacre	September 5, 1817	Benghazi	Nearly 10,000	Ottoman Pasha Yusuf Karamanli ordered the extermination of Al-Jawazi tribe, following a dispute regarding tribute and uprising against his rule.
Sciara Sciatt massacre	October 23, 1911	Tripoli outskirts	Nearly 500 "Bersaglieri"	Italian soldiers were massacred with cruelty and sadism, 290 of them after surrender.
1911 Tripoli massacre	October 24–26, 1911	Tripoli	some 4,000	Italian troops massacred the Muslim Libyan population of the Mechiya oasis the day after the Sciara Sciat massacre. In three days hundreds of civilians, children, women were killed. One hundred women and children were burned in a mosque after mortar attack.
1945 Tripoli pogrom	November 5–7, 1945	Tripoli	140+	Muslim rioters killed Libyan Jews; 36 victims were children.
1948 Tripoli pogrom	June 12, 1948	Tripoli	12	Muslim rioters killed Libyan Jews.
1967 Tripoli pogrom	June 5, 1967	Tripol	18	18 Jews were killed in the pogrom and at least 25 injured
Green Terror	1973–1977	All Libya	Unknown	
Abu Salim Prison massacre	29 June 1996	Abu Salim prison, Tripoli	Up to 1200	Prisoners expressed anger at the restricted family visits and poor living conditions, and were subsequently shot and killed.
Yarmuk massacre	23 August 2011	Tripoli	124	Members of the Khamis Brigade (a military force loyal to Muammar Gaddafi) carried out summary executions of hostages in a warehouse near Tripoli, which was then set on fire. In total, 124 people were killed at the site.
Gargur District	Around 21 August 2011	Gargur, Tripoli	At least 17	Appear to have been shot dead by pro-Gaddafi troops as the rebels advanced on the Gargur district of Tripoli. Those killed were said to have been held prisoner at an Internal Security building in the district.
Camp outside Bab al-Azizia	August 2011	Bab-al-Azizya Compound, Tripoli	At least 29	Not yet known whether the killings were carried out by rebel fighters or pro-Gaddafi troops.
Hotel Mahari	October 2011	Hotel Mahari, Sirte	53	HRW said they believed the hotel had been in the hands of anti-Gaddafi forces from Misrata.
2015 Corinthia Hotel attack	January 27, 2015	Corinthia Hotel Tripoli, Tripoli	10	Car bombing, suicide attack and subsequent hostage situation in hotel known for hosting foreigners and government officials.
2015 kidnapping and beheading of Copts in Libya	February 2015	Southern Mediterranean Sea Coast, Sirte	21	Beheading of 21 Egyptian Coptic Christians By Islamic State
Al Qubbah bombings	February 20, 2015	Al Qubbah	40	ISIL operatives detonated three bombs in Al Qubbah, targeting a petrol station, a police station, and the home of parliamentary speaker Agila Salah. These attacks reportedly killed at least 40 people
2015 Islamic State killing of Christian migrants in Libya	19 April 2015	Southern and eastern Libya	28+	Shooting and beheading of Ethiopian Christian migrants by the Islamic State.
Zliten truck bombing	January 7, 2016	Zliten, Murqub District	60+	Suicide truck bombing at a police training camp
Brak al-Shati Airbase raid	18 May 2017	Brak al-Shati Airbase, Wadi al Shatii District	141	
January 2018 Benghazi bombing	January 23, 2018	Benghazi	41	Twin car bomb attack outside a mosque
February 2018 Benghazi bombing	February 9, 2018	Benghazi	2	A bomb exploded in a mosque.
2018 attack on the High National Elections Commission in Tripoli	May 2, 2018	Tripoli	16	Suicide bombers attacked the head offices of Libya's electoral commission in Tripoli, killing at least 16 people, injuring 20 and setting fire to the building
2019 Tajoura migrant center airstrike	July 2, 2019	Tajoura Detention Center, Tripoli	53	An airstrike by Field Marshal Khalifa Haftar's Libyan National Army hits the Tajoura Detention Center outside Tripoli, while hundreds of people are inside the facility, killing at least 53 of them and injures 130 others.
Tripoli military school airstrike	January 4, 2020	Al-Hadhba military school, Tripoli	26	the United Arab Emirates aiding the Libyan National Army launched an airstrike on a military school used by the UN-backed Government of National Accord in Tripoli. Twenty-six people were killed and thirty-three were wounded
Mizdah massacre	May 27, 2020	Mizda	30	A group of migrants mainly composing of Bangladeshis were executed by their human traffickers.
