= List of terrorist incidents in 2018 =

This is a list of terrorist incidents which took place in 2018, including attacks by violent non-state actors for political motives. Note that terrorism related to drug wars and cartel violence is not included in these lists. Ongoing military conflicts are listed separately.

== Guidelines ==
- To be included, entries must be notable (have a stand-alone article) and described by a consensus of reliable sources as "terrorism".
- List entries must comply with the guidelines outlined in the manual of style under MOS:TERRORIST.
- Casualties figures in this list are the total casualties of the incident including immediate casualties and later casualties (such as people who succumbed to their wounds long after the attacks occurred).
- Casualties listed are the victims. Perpetrator casualties are listed separately (e.g. x (+y) indicate that x victims and y perpetrators were killed/injured).
- Casualty totals may be underestimated or unavailable due to a lack of information. A figure with a plus (+) sign indicates that at least that many people have died (e.g. 10+ indicates that at least 10 people have died)—the actual toll could be considerably higher. A figure with a plus (+) sign may also indicate that over that number of people are victims.
- If casualty figures are 20 or more, they will be shown in **bold**. In addition, figures for casualties more than 50 will also be **underlined**.
- Incidents are limited to one per location per day. If multiple attacks occur in the same place on the same day, they will be merged into a single incident.
- In addition to the guidelines above, the table also includes the following categories:

0 people were killed/injured by the incident.
1–19 people were killed/injured by the incident.
20–49 people were killed/injured by the incident.
50–99 people were killed/injured by the incident.
100+ people were killed/injured by the incident.

== List ==
Total incidents: 75

Date	Type	Dead	Injured	Location	Article	Details	Perpetrator	Part of
2 January	Stabbing	1	0	Orange County, United States	Murder of Blaze Bernstein	The man accused of killing a gay and Jewish University of Pennsylvania student was an avowed neo-Nazi and a member of Atomwaffen Division, one of the country's most notorious extremist groups.	Atomwaffen Division	Terrorism in the United States
15 January	Suicide bombings	38 (+2)	105	Baghdad, Iraq	2018 Baghdad bombings	Two suicide bombings at al-Tayaran Square.	Islamic State	Iraqi insurgency
20-21 January	Shooting, arson, hostage taking	40 (+6)	22	Kabul, Afghanistan	2018 Inter-Continental Hotel Kabul attack	Gunmen launched an attack on the Inter-Continental Hotel. More than 100 people were freed from the hotel and six gunmen were killed.	Taliban and Haqqani Network	War in Afghanistan
23 January	Car bombing	41	80	Benghazi, Libya	January 2018 Benghazi bombing	Twin car bomb attack outside a mosque.	Unknown	Libyan Civil War (2014–present)
24 January	Shooting, suicide car bombing	6	27	Jalalabad, Afghanistan	2018 Save The Children Jalalabad attack	A complex attack began with a suicide car bomb outside the Save The Children offices, followed by gunmen entering the compound and fighting Afghan special forces.	Islamic State	War in Afghanistan
27 January	Suicide car bombing	103	235	Kabul, Afghanistan	2018 Kabul ambulance bombing	A suicide bomber exploded an ambulance laden with explosives near Sidarat Square where several government offices are located.	Taliban	War in Afghanistan
3 February	Shooting	0	6	Macerata, Italy	Macerata shooting	An gunman with extreme right-wing sympathies shot and injured six African asylum seekers.	Luca Traini (Right wing extremist)	Terrorism in Italy
5 February	Stabbing	1	0	Ariel, West Bank	2018 Ariel stabbing	An Israeli man was stabbed to death at a bus station.	Palestinian nationalist	Israeli–Palestinian conflict
9 February	Bombing	2	143	Benghazi, Libya	February 2018 Benghazi bombing	A bomb exploded in a mosque.	Unknown	Libyan Civil War (2014–present)
10–11 February	Shooting, grenade attack	7 (+3)	11	Jammu, India	2018 Sunjuwan attack	Gunmen attacked an Army camp. Three of them were shot dead by the Army.	Jaish-e-Mohammed	Insurgency in Jammu and Kashmir
10–13 February	Bombings	12	50	Oruro, Bolivia	2018 Oruro attacks	Two bomb attacks.	Unknown	Terrorism in Bolivia
18 February	Shooting	5 (+1)	5	Kizlyar, Russia	Kizlyar church shooting	Shooting at a church. The attacker was shot and killed by police.	Islamic State	Insurgency in the North Caucasus
19 February	Kidnapping	5	108	Dapchi, Nigeria	Dapchi schoolgirls kidnapping	111 students from one school and two other students from another school were abducted by Boko Haram. The insurgents later released 107 of them but one was still in custody.	Boko Haram	Boko Haram insurgency
21 February	Bombing	2	22	Lashio, Myanmar	2018 Lashio bombing	A bomb exploded at a bank.	Northern Alliance (suspected)	Internal conflict in Myanmar
23 February	Suicide car bombings, shooting	45 (+5)	36	Mogadishu, Somalia	February 2018 Mogadishu attack	Two car bombings and subsequent gunfire.	Al-Shabaab	Somali Civil War
24 February	Bombings	0	1	Sittwe, Myanmar	2018 Sittwe bombings	Three bombs exploded in the capital of Rakhine State.	Rakhine nationalists (suspected)	Northern Rakhine State clashes
2 March	Shooting, suicide car bombing	30	85	Ouagadougou, Burkina Faso	2018 Ouagadougou attacks	Attacks on the French embassy and cultural center and the army headquarters.	Al-Qaeda in the Islamic Maghreb	Insurgency in the Maghreb
11 March	Stabbing	0 (+1)	1	Vienna, Austria	2018 Vienna embassy stabbing	An Islamist stabbed and injured a guard at the residence of the Iranian ambassador. The attacker was shot and killed.	Islamist	Islamic terrorism in Europe
13 March	Bombing	9	10	Sukma district, India	2018 Sukma attack	Nine paramilitary troopers of the Indian Central Reserve Police Force were killed and about ten others wounded after Naxalites targeted their vehicle with an improvised explosive device in Chhattisgarh.	CPI	Naxalite–Maoist insurgency
21 March	Suicide bombing	33 (+1)	65	Kabul, Afghanistan	March 2018 Kabul suicide bombing	Suicide bombing near a Shiite shrine as Afghans celebrated the Persian New Year.	Islamic State	War in Afghanistan
22 March	Car bombing	18	22	Mogadishu, Somalia	March 2018 Mogadishu bombing	Car bomb explosion near a hotel.	Al-Shabaab	Somali Civil War
23 March	Shootings, stabbing, hostage taking	4 (+1)	15	Carcassonne and Trèbes, France	Carcassonne and Trèbes attack	A gunman affiliated with the Islamic State attacked the cities of Carcassonne and Trèbes: He attacked and stole a car, killing the passenger and wounding the driver, in Carcassonne. He arrived in Trèbes and during the process a police officer was injured when the terrorist shot him. Then, he attacked a supermarket, where two civilians were killed and several others injured. A policeman exchanged himself for a hostage, was later shot and stabbed and died of his injuries in hospital. The attacker was later killed by the police.	Islamic State	Islamic terrorism in Europe
30 March	Shooting	7	6	Eruh, Turkey	Siirt raid	Six village guards were killed in an attack by PKK terrorists in Siirt Province. Three village guards and four soldiers were wounded. One soldier died from his injury days later.	PKK	Kurdish–Turkish conflict
1 April	Suicide car bombings, mortar attack, shooting, arson	59 (+14)	Unknown	Bulo Marer, Somalia	2018 African Union base attack in Bulo Marer	Al-Shabaab terrorists attacked an African Union military camp in the Bulo Marer area of Lower Shebelle, where Ugandan peacekeepers are stationed.	Al-Shabaab	Somali Civil War
12 April	Bombings	25	18	Al-Shirqat District, Iraq	2018 Asdira funeral bombing	Bombing at a funeral for Sunni Muslim tribal fighters in the village of Asdira.	Islamic State	Iraqi insurgency
14 April	Rocket attack, suicide car bombings, shooting	1 (+15)	16	Timbuktu, Mali	MINUSMA super camp attack	The attackers first fired rockets at a camp of MINUSMA and Barkhane. Then two suicide car bombers detonated at various locations in the camp. One peacekeeper was killed, 15 terrorists were killed, seven French soldiers, seven MINUSMA peacekeepers and two civilians were injured.	Al-Qaeda in the Islamic Maghreb	Northern Mali conflict
22 April	Suicide bombing	69 (+1)	120	Kabul, Afghanistan	22 April 2018 Kabul suicide bombing	Suicide bomb attack at a voter registration centre. The casualties were all civilians, most of whom had been waiting outside the office to apply for their IDs in order to register to vote in the upcoming elections.	Islamic State	War in Afghanistan
23 April	Vehicle ramming	11	15	Toronto, Canada	2018 Toronto van attack	A van struck several people on Yonge Street and Finch Avenue, killing 11 and injuring 15. Authorities found out he had a severe hatred for women after tracing him to several online incel (involuntary celibate) forums.	Alek Minassian	Misogynist terrorism
30 April	Suicide bombings	29 (+2)	50	Kabul, Afghanistan	30 April 2018 Kabul suicide bombings	Two suicide bombings.	Islamic State	War in Afghanistan
1 May	Suicide bombings	86 (+2)	58	Mubi, Nigeria	2018 Mubi suicide bombings	Two suicide attacks at a mosque and a market in Adamawa State.	Boko Haram	Boko Haram insurgency
2 May	Shooting, arson, suicide bombings	16 (+2)	20	Tripoli, Libya	2018 attack on the High National Elections Commission in Tripoli, Libya	Suicide bombers attacked the head offices of Libya's electoral commission, setting fire to the building.	Islamic State	Libyan Civil War
8–10 May	Shooting, stabbings, hostage taking	6 (+2)	4	Depok, Indonesia	2018 Mako Brimob standoff	Five police officers and one militant were killed and four others injured in a standoff between security forces and terrorists in a detention center. Hours after the end of the siege, an Islamic militant fatally stabbed a policeman at the police detention center before he was shot by another policeman.	Islamic State	Terrorism in Indonesia
12 May	Stabbing	1 (+1)	4	Paris, France	2018 Paris knife attack	A man stabbed a pedestrian to death and injured four other before being killed by police.	Islamic State	Islamic terrorism in Europe
13–14 May	Suicide bombings, suicide car bombing, bombing	15 (+13)	57	Surabaya and Sidoarjo, Indonesia	Surabaya bombings	A series of terrorist attacks. The attacks killed 15 civilians, mostly churchgoers, and injured 57 others. 13 perpetrators also died as a result of the bombings.	Islamic State	Terrorism in Indonesia
16 May	Vehicular attack, stabbing	1 (+4)	4	Pekanbaru, Indonesia	Pekanbaru sword attack	Terrorists drove a vehicle into the entrance of the Riau provincial police headquarters, and began attacking officers with samurai swords, killing an officer and injuring two other policemen and two journalists. The police then shot and killed four attackers.	Islamic State	Terrorism in Indonesia
28–29 May	Melee attack, stabbing, shooting, hostage taking	4 (+1)	4	Marche-en-Famenne and Liège, Belgium	2018 Liège attack	A man who shouted "Allahu Akbar" stabbed two female police officers, then took their guns and used them to shoot and kill the two officers and a pedestrian in Liège. The gunman took a woman hostage before he was killed by police. Four other police officers were wounded, one of whom was seriously injured. Before the attack, the attacker also killed a man in Marche-en-Famenne, repeatedly hitting him with a hammer.	Islamic State	Islamic terrorism in Europe
23 June	Grenade attack	2	47	Bulawayo, Zimbabwe	2018 Bulawayo bombing	Two people were killed and at least 47 others, including Vice-president Kembo Mohadi, injured in a grenade attack on President Emmerson Mnangagwa.	Unknown	Zimbabwe protests
1 July	Suicide bombing	20 (+1)	20	Jalalabad, Afghanistan	July 2018 Jalalabad suicide bombing	A suicide bomber detonated his explosives in the center of Jalalabad.	Islamic State	War in Afghanistan
7 July	Car bombings, shooting	20 (+3)	24	Mogadishu, Somalia	July 2018 Mogadishu bombings	Fighters of the Somali group Al-Shabaab attacked the compound of the interior and security ministries, detonating two car bombs outside the main gate of the interior ministry before three militants stormed it. All three gunmen were killed by the security forces.	Al-Shabaab	Somali Civil War
10 July	Suicide bombing	22 (+1)	75	Peshawar, Pakistan	2018 Peshawar suicide bombing	A suicide bombing at an election rally killed at least 22 people, including prominent local politician Haroon Bilour. The attack at a campaign event organised by the Awami National Party also injured at least 75 people.	Tehrik-i-Taliban Pakistan	War in North-West Pakistan
13 July	Bombing	5	37	Bannu, Pakistan	2018 Mastung and Bannu bombings	Explosives fitted to a motorbike detonated at an election rally.	Ittehad-ul-Mujahideen	War in North-West Pakistan
13 July	Suicide bombing	149 (+1)	186	Mastung, Pakistan	2018 Mastung and Bannu bombings	At least 149 people, including the Balochistan Awami Party candidate Nawabzada Siraj Raisani, were killed and 186 others injured when a suicide bomber detonated his explosives.	Islamic State	War in North-West Pakistan
22 July	Suicide bombing	3 (+1)	3	Kulachi, Pakistan	2018 Kulachi suicide bombing	A suicide bombing in the Dera Ismail Khan district killed a candidate running for a seat in the provincial assembly, his driver and a guard and injured three other people.	Tehrik-i-Taliban Pakistan	War in North-West Pakistan
25 July	Suicide bombing	31 (+1)	40	Quetta, Pakistan	2018 Quetta suicide bombing	At least 31 people, including five policemen and two children, were killed and 40 others wounded after a suicide bomber blew himself up outside a polling station.	Islamic State	War in North-West Pakistan
25 July	Suicide bombings, shootings, hostage taking	255 (+63)	180	As-Suwayda Governorate, Syria	2018 As-Suwayda attacks	Islamic state militants carried out suicide bombings and gun attacks in the city of As-Suwayda and a number of villages in the governorate of As-Suwayda. At least 63 terrorists were also killed, including the suicide bombers. The jihadists also seized hostages from the villages they attacked.	Islamic State	Syrian Civil War
28 July	Shooting	+1 (+Unknown)	+1 (+Unknown)	Ndop, Cameroon	Ndop prison break	At least 50 separatist fighters stormed the premises of the central prison and freed 163 inmates before burning down the prison and seizing weapons and ammunition before retreating.	Ambazonia Defence Forces	Anglophone crisis
29 July	Vehicular attack, stabbing, shooting	4 (+4)	2	Danghara District, Tajikistan	Terrorist attack against cyclists in Tajikistan	Two Americans, a Swiss and a Dutch national were killed and two others injured in a terrorist attack in the Khatlon Region. First a car hit the cyclists and then the occupants of the vehicle got out and stabbed and shot the tourists. Members of the security forces later killed four people suspected of being involved in the attack.	Islamic State	Terrorism in Tajikistan
31 July	Suicide car bombing	9 (+1)	12	Lamitan, Philippines	2018 Lamitan bombing	A bomb exploded in a van and killed a suspected bomber, a soldier, four paramilitaries and four civilians, including a mother and her child, at a military checkpoint in the province of Basilan. Twelve others were wounded.	Abu Sayyaf	Moro conflict
28 August	Bombing	2	36	Isulan, Philippines	2018 Isulan bombings	Explosion of a homemade bomb during a street festival in Sultan Kudarat province.	Bangsamoro Islamic Freedom Fighters	Moro conflict
31 August	Stabbing	0	2 (+1)	Amsterdam, Netherlands	2018 Amsterdam stabbing attack	An Afghan teenager stabbed and injured two Americans in Amsterdam Central Station. The attacker was shot and injured.	Jawad S	Islamic terrorism in Europe
2 September	Bombing	2	15	Sultan Kudarat, Philippines	2018 Isulan bombings	Bomb blast in an internet café.	Bangsamoro Islamic Freedom Fighters	Moro conflict
2 September	Suicide car bombing	7 (+1)	14	Mogadishu, Somalia	2 September 2018 Mogadishu bombing	A suicide car bombing hit a government office, causing a nearby school to collapse.	Al-Shabaab	Somali Civil War
5 September	Suicide car bombing, suicide bombing	26 (+2)	91	Kabul, Afghanistan	September 2018 Kabul attacks	Blast in a wrestling club followed by another attacker who detonated when emergency services arrived.	Islamic State	War in Afghanistan
10 September	Shooting	2 (+2)	10	Tripoli, Libya	2018 National Oil Corporation attack	Masked men attacked the headquarters of the National Oil Corporation (NOC).	Islamic State	Libyan Civil War
11 September	Suicide Bombing	68 (+1)	165	Momand Dara District, Afghanistan	September 2018 Jalalabad suicide bombing	A suicide bomber targeted a gathering of protesters.	Islamic State (suspected)	War in Afghanistan
12 September	Vehicular Attack	15	43	Mishui, China	2018 Mishui vehicle attack	A man plowed into a crowded square and attacked people with a knife and spade seeking “revenge” on society. The attacker, Yang Zanyun, was sentenced to death and executed.	Lone Wolf	Terrorism in China
22 September	Mass shooting	25 (+5)	70	Ahvaz, Iran	Ahvaz military parade attack	Gunmen opened fire during a military parade.	Islamic State (suspected) / Ahvaz National Resistance (suspected)	Terrorism in Iran
7 October	Shooting	2	1	Barkan, West Bank	2018 Barkan Industrial Park shooting	A Palestinian gunman opened fire with an improvised submachine gun on factory workers in the industrial zone of Barkan. The attacker fled the scene.	Palestinian nationalist	Israeli–Palestinian conflict
20 October	Shooting	9	0	Sagay, Philippines	2018 Sagay massacre	Farmers belonging to the National Federation of Sugar Workers were killed, including four women and two children, while they were eating dinner in a makeshift tent on a farm in Negros Occidental.	Revolutionary Proletarian Army	Communist rebellion in the Philippines
22 October–1 November	Attempted bombings	0	0	Various cities across the United States (Note: Katonah, New York; Chappaqua, New York; New York City; Washington, D.C.; Sunrise, Florida; Los Angeles; New Castle, Delaware; Wilmington, Delaware; Opa-locka, Florida; Sacramento, California; Burlingame, California; and Atlanta)	October 2018 United States mail bombing attempts	A registered Republican Party member from Aventura, Florida, sent mail bombs to various Democratic Party politicians and liberal media personalities and individuals across the United States including CNN Headquarters. The perpetrator was arrested on October 26, and in 2019 pled guilty to 65 felony counts such as using weapons of mass destruction in a terrorist attack.	Cesar Alteri Sayoc Jr.	Terrorism in the United States; Far-right terrorism Radical right in the United States
24 October	Shooting	2	0	Kentucky, USA	2018 Jeffersontown shooting	Two elderly victims, both African Americans, were killed while shopping at a Kroger store in Jeffersontown by a white gunman, who was later charged in state court with two counts of murder and ten counts of wanton endangerment, and held on $5 million bail. On November 15, a federal grand jury in the Western District of Kentucky indicted the shooter on six counts: three hate crime charges and three firearms offenses.	Gregory Alan Bush	Terrorism in the United States; Far-right terrorism and Radical right in the United States
27 October	Mass shooting	11	6 (+1)	Pittsburgh, United States	Pittsburgh synagogue shooting	A gunman opened fire inside the Tree of Life synagogue. According to witnesses the attacker yelled "All Jews must die!" A group of police officers were also shot during the incident. He was subsequently arrested.	Robert Bowers	Terrorism in the United States; Far-right terrorism and Radical right in the United States
1 November	Shooting	5	2	Sadiya, India	Tinsukia killings	Suspected militants shot dead five youths and injured at least 2 more.	United Liberation Front of Assam (suspected)	Insurgency in Northeast India
2 November	Mass shooting	7	14	Minya Governorate, Egypt	2018 Minya bus attack	At least seven Christian Copts were killed and 14 injured when gunmen opened fire on them when they were travelling by bus from Sohag to St. Samuel's monastery.	Islamic State	Insurgency in Egypt
4 November	Kidnapping	0	80	Nkwen, near Bamenda, Cameroon	PSS Nkwen kidnapping	At least 80 people including 79 children were kidnapped from a school by anglophone separatist militants in the restive region of Bamenda. While the kidnappers identified as "Amba Boys" and the government blamed the separatists, the Ambazonia Self-Defence Council claimed that they not only had nothing to do with the kidnappings, but had also sent its own fighters to try to locate the children.	Amba Boys	Anglophone crisis
4 November	Shooting	3	10	Amazonas, Venezuela	2018 Amazonas ambush	3 Venezuelan border guards were killed and 10 were wounded in a suspected ELN rebel attack.	ELN (suspected)	Spillover of Colombian conflict
9 November	Stabbing, arson, attempted car bombing	1 (+1)	2	Melbourne, Australia	2018 Melbourne stabbing attack	An Italian man was stabbed to death while two others were injured after a Somali man carried out an attack, who also set his car on fire, in the attempt to blow it. The attacker was shot dead by the police.	Islamic State	Terrorism in Australia
20 November	Stabbing	0	2	Brussels, Belgium	2018 Brussels stabbing attack	A lone wolf terrorist attacked police officers outside a police station. One police officer was wounded and the attacker was shot and injured. The police suspect Islamic terrorism.	Issam T	Islamic terrorism in Europe
23 November	Shooting	4 (+3)	0	Karachi, Pakistan	2018 Karachi Chinese consulate attack	Armed assault on the Chinese consulate.	Balochistan Liberation Army	Insurgency in Balochistan
23 November	Suicide Bombing	34 (+1)	56	Kalaya, Pakistan	2018 Orakzai bombing	Suicide bombing in a market in the Shi'ite dominated region of Kalaya, Khyber Pakhtunkhwa.	Islamic State	War in North-West Pakistan
6 December	Suicide car bombing	2 (+1)	48	Chabahar, Iran	2018 Chabahar suicide bombing	A suicide car bomb exploded near a police post, leaving two police officers dead.	Ansar Al-Furqan	Sistan and Baluchestan insurgency
11 December	Mass murder, mass shooting, murder-suicide	5 (+1)	4	Campinas, Brazil	Campinas Cathedral shooting	A gunman opened fire in the Metropolitan Cathedral of Campinas, killing five people and wounding four more.	Euler Fernando Grandolpho	Terrorism in Brazil
11–13 December	Shooting, stabbing	5 (+1)	12	Strasbourg, France	2018 Strasbourg attack	Shooting attack near a Christmas Market. The attacker escaped in a taxi and was shot dead by police two days after.	Cherif Chekatt	Islamic terrorism in Europe
17 December	Melee attack, decapitation	2	0	Imlil, Marrakesh-Safi, Morocco	Murders of Louisa Vesterager Jespersen and Maren Ueland	Two female Scandinavian tourists, one Norwegian and one Danish citizen, were found brutally murdered in their tent in the Atlas Mountains. The police arrested 22 men in connection with the incident.	Islamic State (suspected)	Insurgency in the Maghreb
31 December	Stabbing	0	3	Manchester, United Kingdom	Manchester Victoria stabbing attack	Three people including one police officer were stabbed in an attack at Victoria Station on New Year's Eve. A mentally disturbed man was sentenced to life imprisonment for three attempted murders that were considered to have a terrorist connection.	Mahdi Mohamud	Islamic terrorism in Europe
