= Porta Pia =

Gate of the Aurelian walls, a landmark of Rome, Italy

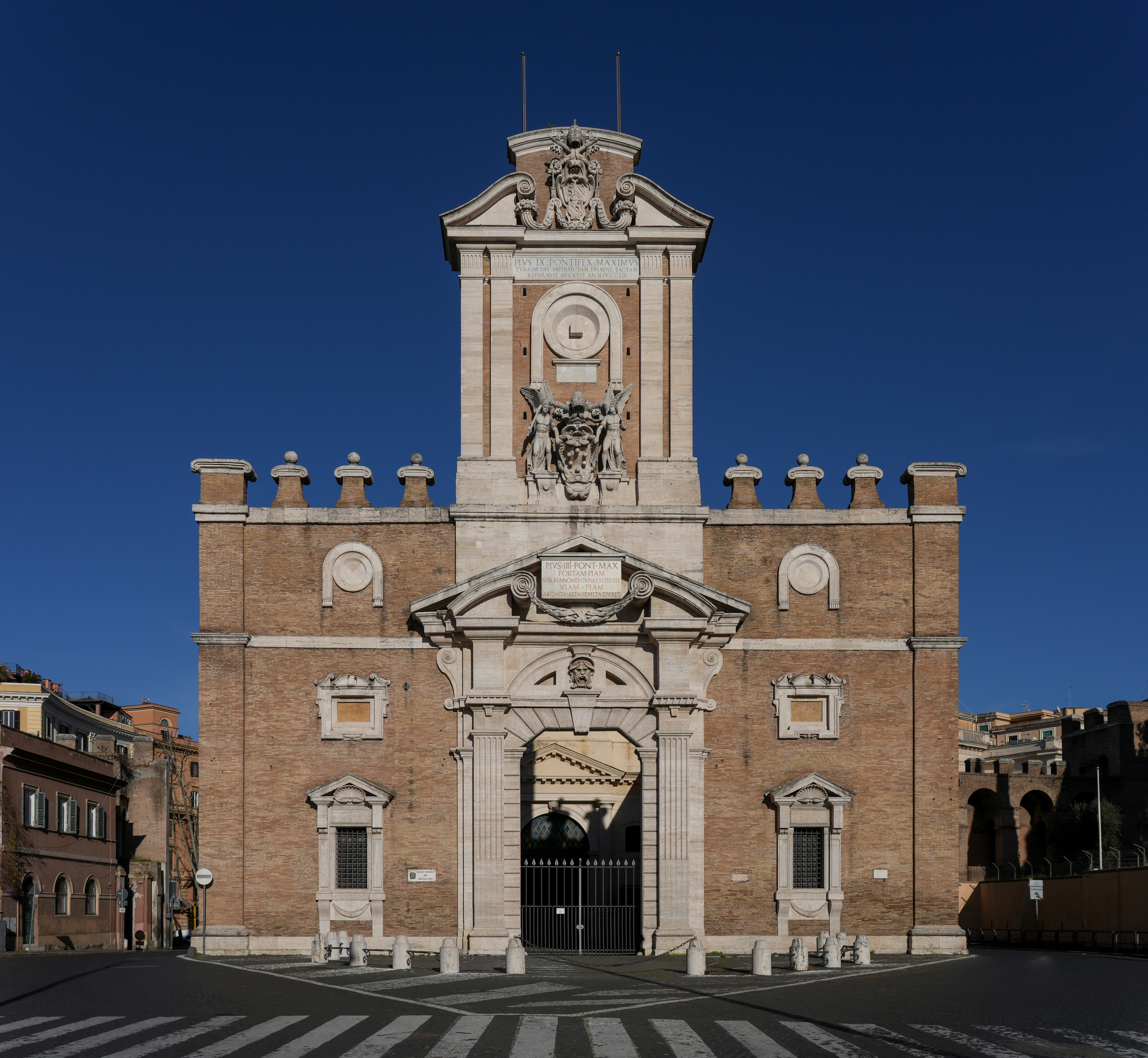
- The internal façade of Porta Pia

- Location within Rome
- Interactive map of Porta Pia
- 41°54′33″N 12°30′4″E

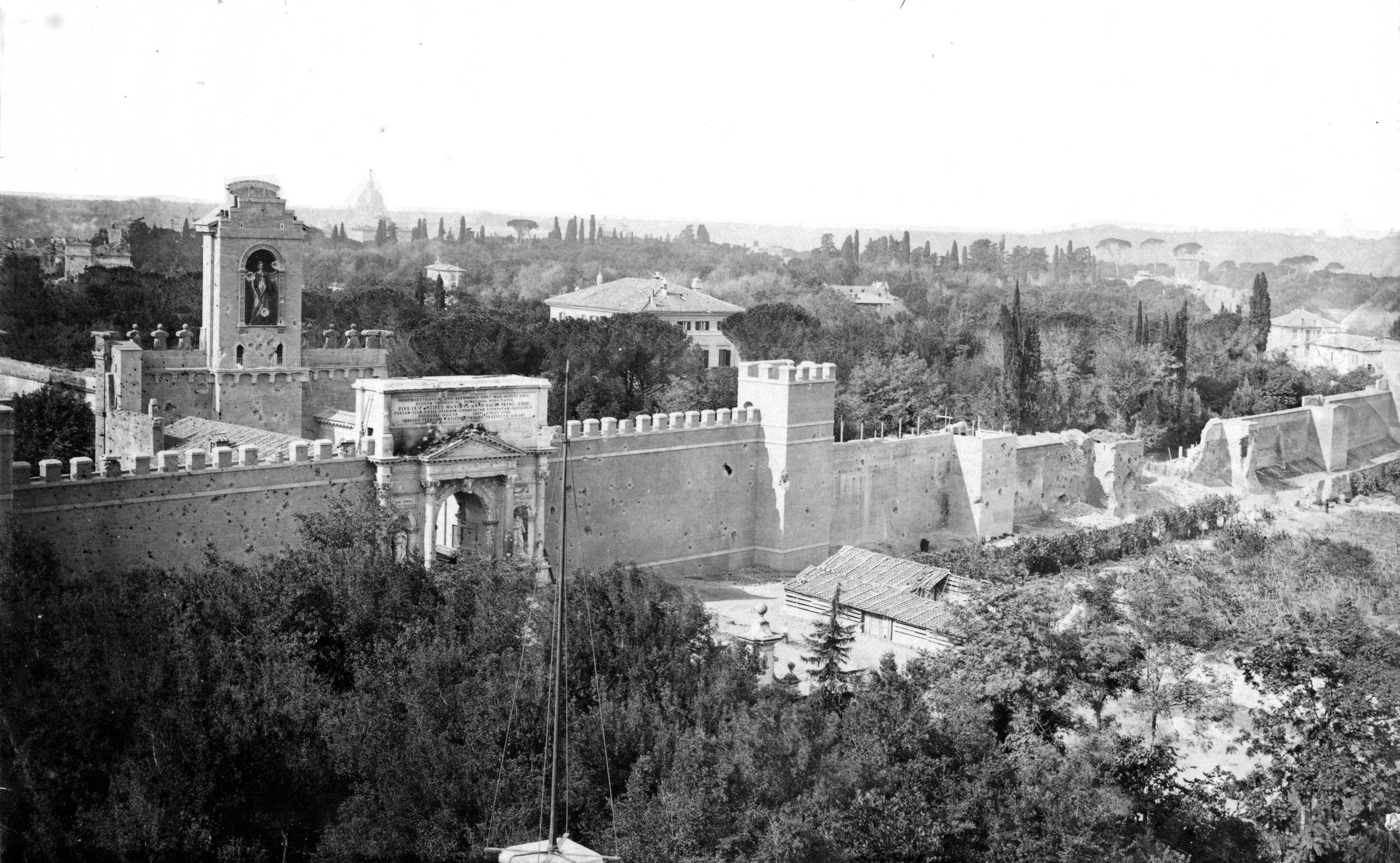
The breach of Porta Pia, on the right, in a contemporaneous photograph following the Capture of Rome in 1870

Porta Pia was one of the northern gates in the Aurelian Walls of Rome, Italy. One of Pope Pius IV's civic improvements to the city, it is named after him. Situated at the end of a new street, the Via Pia, it was designed by Michelangelo to replace the Porta Nomentana situated several hundred meters southwards, which was closed up at the same time. Construction began in 1561 and ended in 1565, after the artist's death. A 1561 bronze commemorative medal by Gian Federico Bonzagna shows an early plan by Michelangelo, very different from his final design. The façade on the outside of the city was completed in 1869 under the Neo-Classicist design by Virginio Vespignani.

== History ==
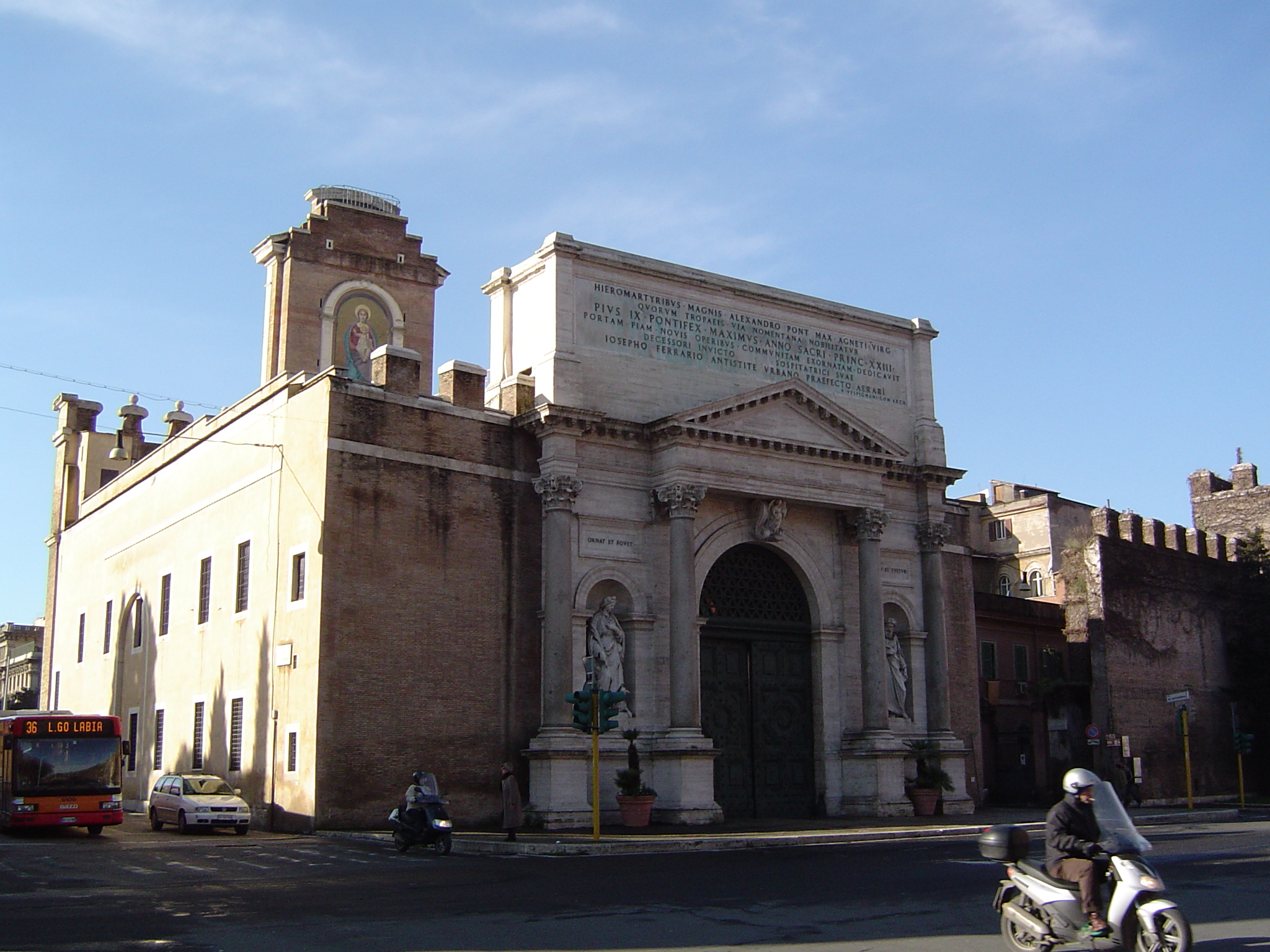
Country side of Porta Pia

A replacement was needed because of the new urban area, which could no longer provide access through the ancient Porta Nomentana for the Via Nomentana. According to Vasari, Michelangelo presented three different designs to the Pope, which were beautiful but too extravagant, and the Pope (perhaps not very convinced by certain details of the drawings) chose the cheapest of the three. No trace survives of the three drawings (except for some sketches for certain details), nor is it certain that the work was actually carried out to the original plan. The present appearance underwent several changes: the designs depicted on a commemorative coin minted in 1561 and in an engraving of 1568 (the only documentation of this epoch) present the Porta Pia quite differently from how it appears today. Moreover, even forty years after its construction, the gate was shown on maps of Rome as almost like a ruin. In any case, the gate depicted on the coin appears to be the closest to the initial plan, although we cannot exclude the possibility that in the course of works some variations and reviews were made to the design and its details, remembering that the Pope chose the cheapest design. It was, however, Michelangelo's last architectural work – he died shortly before the work was completed. The work was carried out by Giacomo Del Duca, who also built Porta San Giovanni.

Most experts consider that Michelangelo was concerned with creating picturesque and dramatic facades to fulfill their important symbolic function as an entrance to Rome. The gate is further emphasized by his positioning of the portal at the end of strada Pia, which resumed the route of the ancient "Alta Semita". It then continues on the current Via XX Settembre, to conclude with an imposing frontal prospect a long straight front beginning at the Quirinal. For a more scenic effect, the gate was set slightly behind the line of the walls, which was connected with two lateral oblique sections of wall, overhung by the wall-ends of the gate, and had only one arch (as it appears on the medal) with the reverse facade facing the city, whereas on the outside was only a simple fornix.

A second arch was opened around 1575 to facilitate the transit of traffic, significantly increased by the closure of the nearby porta Nomentana, as stated on the inscription over the central arch:

PIVS IIII PONT MAX
PORTAM PIAM
SVBLATA NOMENTANA EXTRVXIT
VIAM PIAM AEQVATA ALTA SEMITA DVXIT

The prints and engravings up to 1577 depict a tower on the outside of a gate – it is doubtful whether this was lost from the design due to a collapse or due to a lessening desire for architectural motifs.

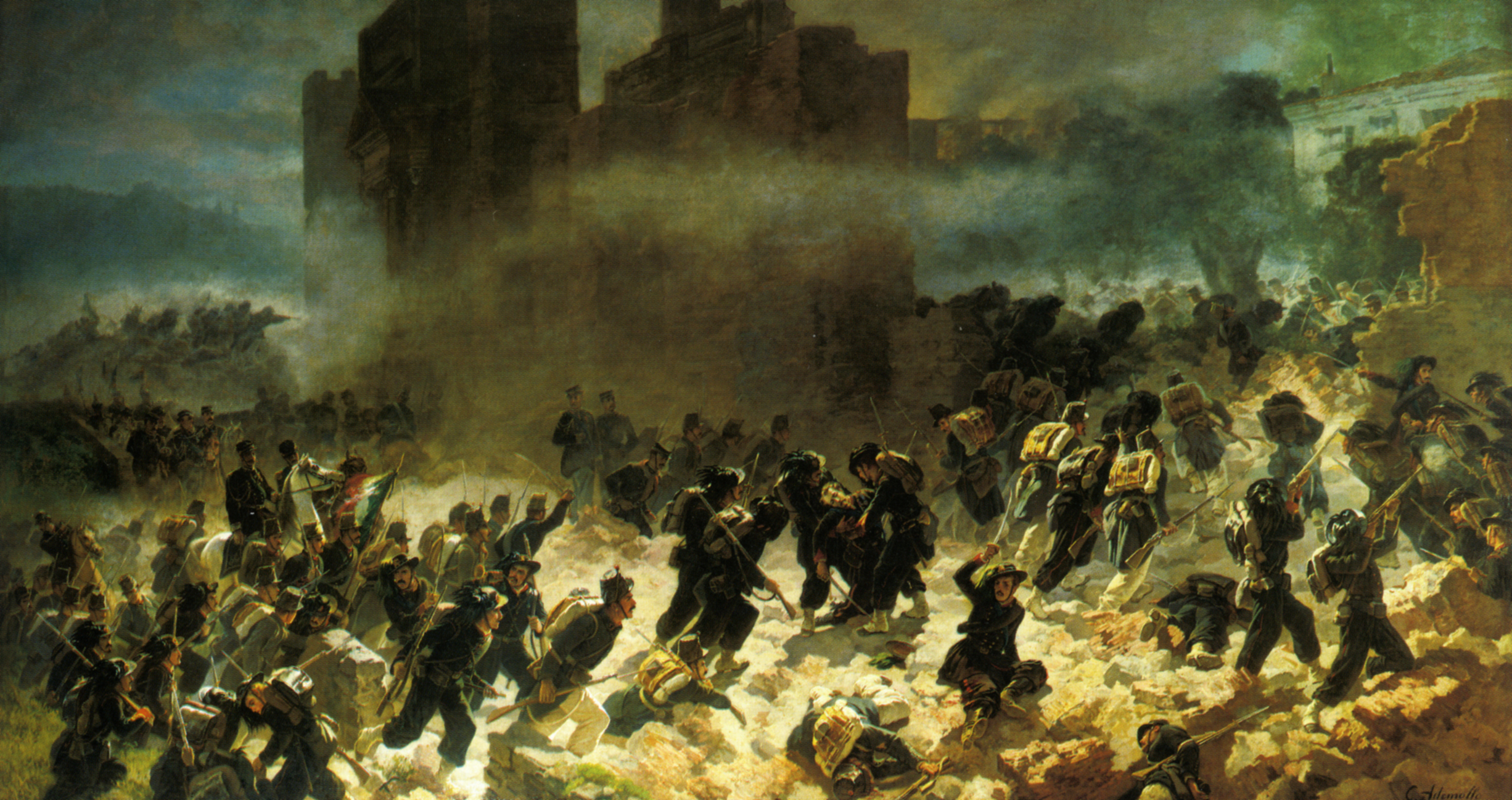
Kingdom of Italy troops breaching the Aurelian Walls at Porta Pia during the Capture of Rome. Breccia di Porta Pia (1870), by Carlo Ademollo.

The external facade was completed in 1869 to neoclassical plans by Virginio Vespignani, who seems to have been inspired by an engraving of 1568 to follow Michelangelo's original plans quite closely. Beginning in 1853 with a restoration due to damage from a lightning strike in 1851, the works also included the addition of new buildings and a courtyard. The new facade, in keeping with the city walls, houses two statues each in their own niche (in this case, of saints Agnes and Alexander, according to the will of Pius IX), flanked by four columns. The Pope wanted a memorial to his escape from danger during the collapse of the audience chamber at the Sant'Agnese convent (near the gate) during his visit there on April 12, 1855. An inscription above the arch on the external side recorded this escape:

HIEROMARTYRIBVS MAGNIS ALEXANDRO PONT MAX AGNETI VIRG
QVORVM TROPAEIS VIA NOMENTANA NOBILITATVR
PIVS IX PONTIFEX MAXIMVS ANNO SACRI PRINC XXIII
PORTAM PIAM NOVIS OPERIBVS COMMVNITAM EXORNATAM DEDICAVIT
DECESSORI INVICTO SOSPITATRICI SVAE
IOSEPHO FERRARIO ANTISTITE VRBANO PRAEFECTO AERARI

It was through an artillery-opened breach in the wall a dozen metres to the west of the gate – known as the "Porta Pia breach" – that on September 20, 1870 Bersaglieri soldiers entered Rome and completed the unification of Italy. A marble and bronze Monument to the Porta Pia Breach is found at the spot where Italian artillery demolished the walls. Opposite the gate, on the external side, at the centre of the piazzale di Porta Pia, is the Monumento al Bersagliere, commissioned by Mussolini and erected in 1932 by Publio Morbiducci. The buildings between the two arches of the gate, once housing the customs office, are now the seat of the Historical Museum of the Bersaglieri, with the monumental tomb of Enrico Toti.

Here, on September 11, 1926, the antifascist activist Gino Lucetti threw a bomb against the car transporting Benito Mussolini, but without effect.

== See also ==
- Porta Pinciana – Gate of the Aurelian walls, a landmark of Rome, Italy
- Capture of Rome – 1870 completion of Italian unification

Preceded by Porta Nomentana	Landmarks of Rome; Porta Pia	Succeeded by Porta Pinciana
