= Battle and massacre at Shar al-Shatt =

Part of the Italo-Turkish War in 1911

Battle of Sciara-Sciat and Bu-Meliana
- Part of The Italo-Turkish War
- Map of the battle of Shar al-Shatt
Date	23 – 26 October 1911
Location	Tripolitania, Ottoman Empire (now Libya) 32°53′43.00″N 13°12′37.00″E
Result	initial Ottoman victory, final Italian victory

Belligerents
Kingdom of Italy	Ottoman Empire: Tripolitania

Commanders and leaders
Pecori Giraldi; Gustavo Fara	Neşet Bey; Mohamed Fekini

Units involved
11th Bersaglieri; 82nd Torino; 84th Venezia	

Strength
8,500	8,000–10,000

Casualties and losses
503 killed 158 wounded (Note: 13 Officers and 361 Soldiers killed, 16 Officers and 142 Soldiers wounded. The casualties of the 11th Bersaglieri alone were 171 killed, 80 wounded (69 soldiers and 11 officers) and 181 missing, with several presumed dead by 1912.)	~1,106 killed (Note: On 23 October, ~320 Arab and 116 Turkish corpses were later retrieved by the Italians on the field. On 26 October, from Sidi Mesri to Bu Meliana ~670 corpses.)

The battle and massacre at Shar al-Shatt (Arabic: شارع الشط Shār’ ash-Shaṭ; Sciara Sciat in Italian) occurred on 23 October 1911 in the village of Shar al-Shatt on the outskirts of Tripoli, Libya during the Italo-Turkish War. 503 Italians were killed in Shar al -Shatt, 290 of which in the following massacre of soldiers who had surrendered. The incident became known as the "Massacre of Italians at Sciara Sciat." The Italians reacted by reconquering Shar al -Shatt and beginning to conduct harsh reprisals.

== Diversionary attacks ==
On October 23, 1911, Captain Carlo Maria Piazza made what is considered the first combat flight, carrying out a reconnaissance southwest of Tripoli, where he detected some activity in the enemy camp, but the report he made was not transmitted to the command, while a second flight, this time carried out by Captain Riccardo Moizo, did not detect anything interesting. In fact, they did not carry out a real aerial reconnaissance but limited themselves to tests of the in-flight efficiency of the engines of the same aircraft with a simple overflight of the oasis near Tripoli. That same morning, the Ottomans, supported by Arab militias, suddenly attacked the Italian defense perimeter in Tripoli. At that time, the defensive perimeter of the city (about 13 km long) was held by about 8,500 men and three artillery batteries: the 6th Infantry Regiment and the 40th Infantry Regiment to the west, the 82nd and 84th Infantry Regiments with a southern front in the center and the 11th Bersaglieri Regiment to the east. The first attack engaged the area west of Tripoli held by the 6th Infantry Regiment, which with the intervention of the battleship Sicilia easily repelled the assault. A second Ottoman attack again struck the western defences of Tripoli held by the 82nd Infantry Regiment, which was again easily repulsed while sporadic rifle fire was reported against the Italian infantry from the oasis behind them. Mopping-up operations were immediately organised, resulting in arrests and seizures of weapons.

== The Assault on the Oasis of Shar al-Shatt, 23 October ==
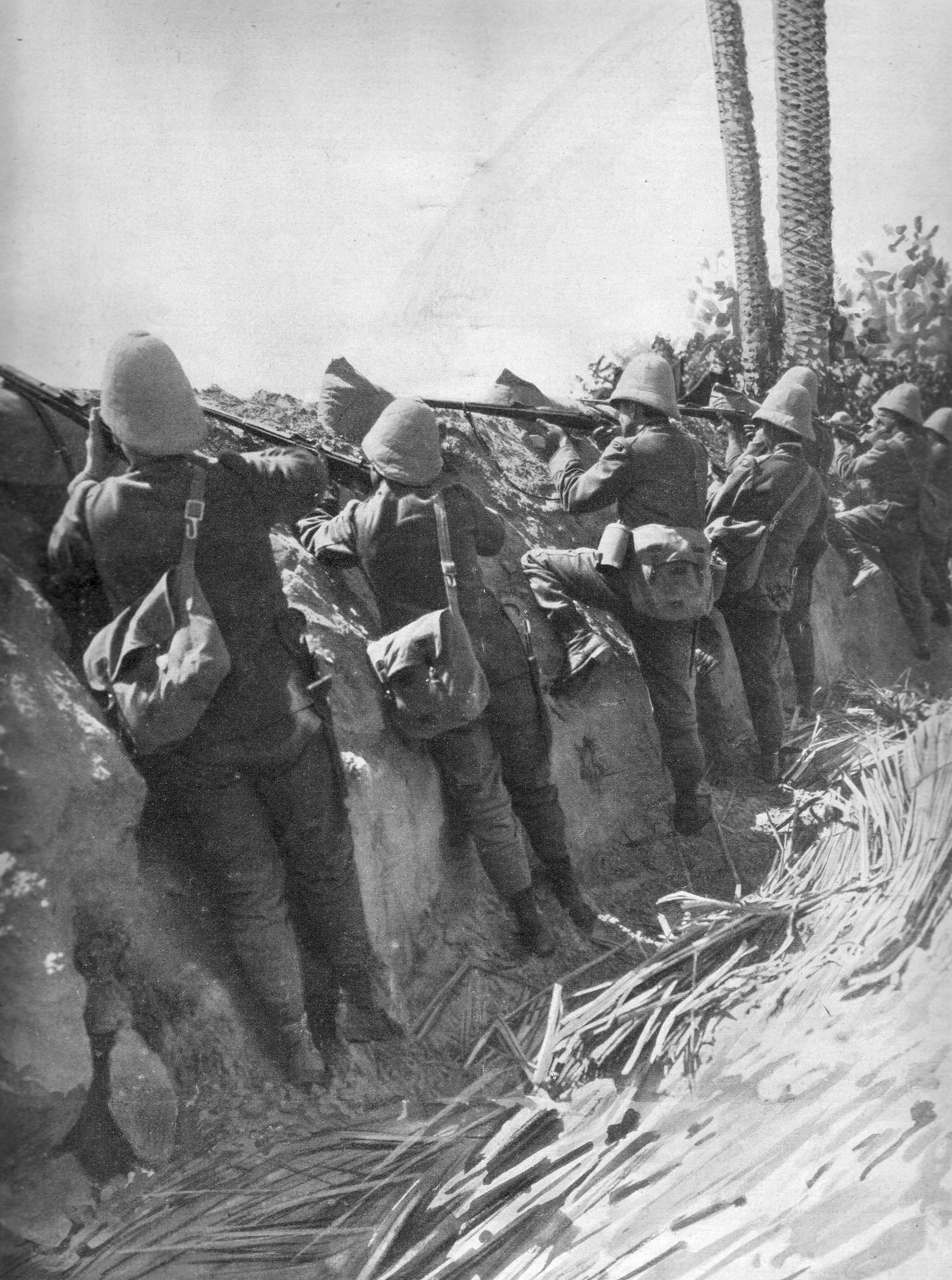
Italian infantry in line during the Battle of Shar al-Shatt

Colonel Neşet's attacks on the Italian positions in the morning served only to mask the main attack that was directed against the less well-armed eastern positions held by the 11th Regiment of Bersaglieri commanded by Colonel Gustavo Fara and which, due to the conformation of the area, could not be adequately fortified. In fact, they were crossing Menscia, a densely populated district of the Tripoli oasis, and therefore could not be supported by artillery (due to the lack of a firing range) and had not been prepared for defense to avoid damaging the property of the inhabitants. The deployment of the bersaglieri saw the XXXIII battalion deployed without reserve between Fort Messri and Henni, the XXVII battalion between Henni and the sea with a company in reserve at Bu Sette, and the XV battalion in reserve east of Henni.

The main attack was directed against the Bersaglieri, striking early in the morning the 7th company of the XXXIII battalion, which was garrisoned at Fort Messri, quickly reinforced by the 9th company, the 3rd company of the XV battalion and infantry units, managing to repel the attackers at the cost of heavy losses. Again, the company was attacked from behind by civilians who were shooting from hidden in the oasis. The 8th company, deployed in Henni, was also heavily engaged, fighting until nightfall, reinforced by the 1st and 2nd company of the XV battalion and the 6th company of the XXVII battalion, which had first headed towards the mosque of Bu Mescia along the road to the cemetery of Rebab, and then towards Henni where the defense was led by Gustavo Fara.

The most critical situation occurred in the sector of the XXVII Battalion, positioned around Shar al-Shatt with the 4 Company east of Henni flanked on its left by the 5th Company, deployed as far as the sea. Also hit by violent attacks, the battalion could not count on any reserves or immediate reinforcements and soon found itself in serious difficulties, aggravated by the increasing number of attacks on its own ranks by the local population. The 4 Company was forced to withdraw towards the cemetery of Rebab, where it barricaded itself to defend itself until the surrender. The 5th company initially managed to hold out, but around 1 p.m. it too had to retreat, first to Amedia, then to Tripoli itself, constantly harassed by the attackers and under fire from the local population who were shooting from every house, also suffering heavy losses.

The situation only stabilized around 5 p.m., with the arrival of a battalion of the 82nd Infantry Regiment, and two battalions of sailors formed by the landing companies of Sicilia, the Sardegna, Re Umberto and Carlo Alberto, supported by a 75 mm landing battery already deployed at Bu Meliana. Shar al-Shatt was only reoccupied at sunset by the infantrymen of the 82nd Infantry Regiment supported by the remains of the 4th and 5th Companies Bersaglieri (reduced to only 57 survivors in two platoons), after a house-to-house fight.

== The Battle of Bu-Meliana, 26 October ==
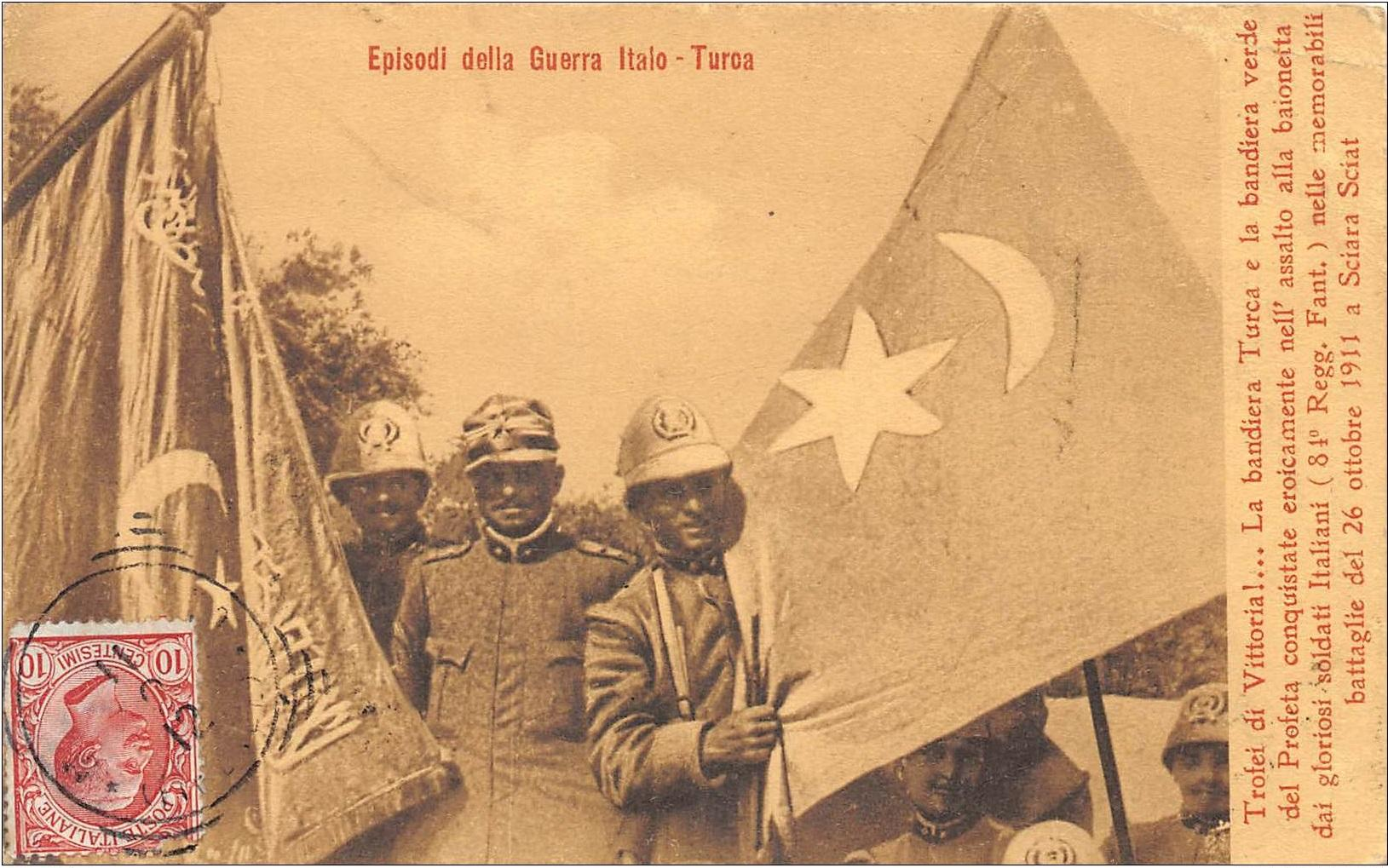
Infantry soldiers of the 84th "Venezia" Regiment, with captured banners.

Three days after the Battle of Shar al-Shatt, on October 26, at 5 am, and with all available forces, the Ottomans attacked Tripoli again, engaging the entire southeastern sector. Despite limited breakthroughs to the west, the Italian line managed to hold, mainly thanks to artillery cover and counterattacks by reinforcements coming from the city (during these clashes, among others, the recipient of the Gold Medal of Military Valor, Riccardo Grazioli Lante della Rovere was killed). By 8 a.m. the Turkish action was over and the attacking forces were in flight. A simultaneous attack on the eastern front of the defense line had no better result.

== Consequences ==
Prime Minister Giovanni Giolitti, after the battle of Shar al-Shatt, pushed to put the army in motion in search of a victory that would restore Italian prestige in Europe. However, General Caneva was sceptical about the success of this operation because he feared the desert, to which the Italian troops were not accustomed, and proposed instead to launch an effective propaganda that would separate the Arab and Turkish elements in the opposing camp.

From a military point of view, the Ottoman counteroffensive shortened the perimeter to the east with the abandonment of some positions (Fort Hamidie, Henni and Fort Mesri). On the political level, however, it marked the end of the Italian illusion of being able to collaborate with the Arabs to drive out the Turks. Meanwhile, the Turks engaged the garrison of Tripoli with guerrilla actions, using snipers and firing isolated artillery shells with pieces that were moved immediately.

During the month of November, seven infantry battalions, one Alpini, one grenadier and one 75 mm battery were transported from Italy, united in the 3rd Special Division(lieutenant général Felice De Chaurand). On November 26, the 11th Bersaglieri and the 93rd Infantry with two battalions of grenadiers completely reoccupied the oasis and recaptured all the positions left between October 27 and 28, protected on the left flank by the 23rd and 52nd Infantry Regiments against possible attacks from Ain Zara.

== Massacre ==
The Italian fleet appeared off Ottoman Tripoli on the evening of 28 September 1911; the city was quickly conquered by a force of 1,500 men.

Despite the quick Italian conquest of the city of Tripoli and its surroundings from the Ottoman Empire by the first days of October, the interior of Ottoman Libya shortly thereafter broke out into revolt, with Italian authorities losing control over large areas of the region.

Before the arrival of the Italian forces, cells led by Ottoman officers (called "Young Turks", like Mustafa Kemal Atatürk) encouraged native Libyans to infiltrate Italian-owned industries and companies in Tripolitania, reconnoiter roads, and take a census of all males able to bear arms in Tripoli and Derna, in preparation for a jihad of the local Muslims.

The interior of Tripolitania rose in revolt from the first weeks and the Italian soldiers were quickly defeated by the local Muslims (supported by Turkish officers), as happened in Shar al-Shatt.

The IV Battalion of the 11th Bersaglieri Regiment of Colonel Gustavo Fara had been positioned at the small oasis village as part of the defenses of Tripoli. On 23 October, the force of about 500 Italian soldiers came under attack from the Turks and Arabs and was quickly overrun and decimated. Approximately 290 Bersaglieri, who survived the initial assault surrendered to the jihadists in the local cemetery, but all were tortured and killed.

I saw (in Sciara Sciat) in one mosque seventeen Italians, crucified with their bodies reduced to the status of bloody rags and bones, but whose faces still retained traces of their hellish agony. Long rods had been passed through the necks of these wretched men and their arms rested on these rods. They were then nailed to the wall and died slowly with untold suffering. It is impossible for us to paint the picture of this hideous rotted meat hanging pitifully on the bloody wall. In a corner another body was crucified, but as an officer he was chosen to experience refined sufferings. His eyes were stitched closed. All the bodies were mutilated and castrated; so indescribable was the scene and the bodies appeared swollen as shapeless carrion. But that's not all! In the cemetery of Chui, which served as a refuge from the Turks and to whence soldiers retreated from afar, we could see another show. In front of one door near the Italian trenches five soldiers had been buried up to their shoulders, their heads emerged from the black sand stained with their blood: heads horrible to see and there you could read all the tortures of hunger and thirst.

Gaston Leroux, correspondent of "Matin-Journal"

Argentine journalist Enzo D'Armesano of the Buenos Aires newspaper "La Prensa" was present the next morning in Shar al-Shatt and reported the cruelty with a description that impressed the Argentinian people. He reported that many local civilians approached the Italians' lines from behind, initially showing friendship, only to fall upon them with knives. He wrote that the three survivors of the 4th Battalion accused the Arab civilians of the Shar al-Shatt oasis of "tradimento" (betrayal).

== Aftermath ==
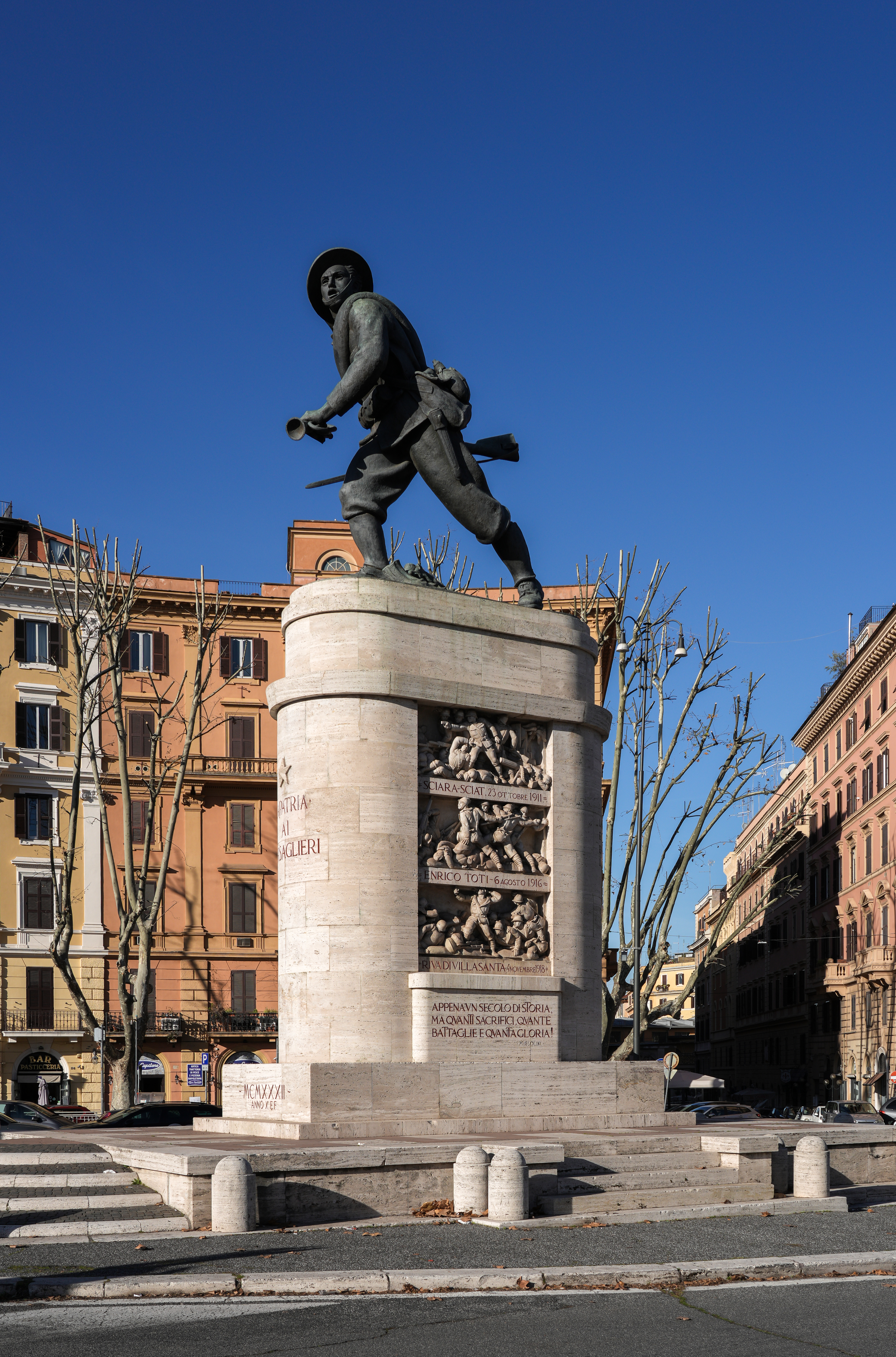
Monument in Rome for the Bersaglieri, with Sciara Sciat reference (the top-most panel on the southeast side of the monument)

Officially, 21 Italian officers and 482 soldiers died at Shar al-Shatt, 290 of them massacred after surrender in the cemetery.

In 1932, Mussolini inaugurated a Monument to the Bersaglieri in Rome, with one of the sculpted panels memorializing those who died at Shar al-Shatt. The monument was designed by architect Italo Mancini and was created by sculptor Publio Morbiducci.

== See also ==
- Italian Libya
- List of massacres in Libya
- Monument to the Bersagliere, Porta Pia

== Works cited ==
- Bandini, Franco (1971). Gli italiani in Africa storia delle guerre colonialili 1882-1943. Milano: Longanesi & C.
- Childs, Timothy Winston (1990). Italo-Turkish Diplomacy and the War Over Libya: 1911–1912. Brill. ISBN 90-04-09025-8.
- Cronaca e storia del corpo dei Bersaglieri, 1836–1986 [Chronicle and History of the Bersaglieri Corps (1836-1986)] (in Italian). Piazza. 1986. OCLC 219933820.
- de Martino, Antonio (1911). Tripoli Italiana: la guerra italo-turca [Tripoli Italiana: The Italian-Turkish War]. Società libraria italiana.
- Gerwarth, Robert; Manela, Erez (2014). Empires at War: 1911–1923. OUP Oxford. ISBN 978-0-19-100694-4.
- Leroux, Gaston (23 August 1917). "No title cited". Matin Journal.
- Painter, Borden (2007). Mussolini's Rome: Rebuilding the Eternal City. Palgrave Macmillan. ISBN 978-1-4039-8002-1.
- Vandervort, Bruce (2012). Verso la quarta sponda la guerra italiana per la Libia (1911-1912) (in Italian). Rome: Stato maggiore dell'esercito.
