= Monument to the Porta Pia Breach =

Coordinates: 41.91004°N 12.50001°E

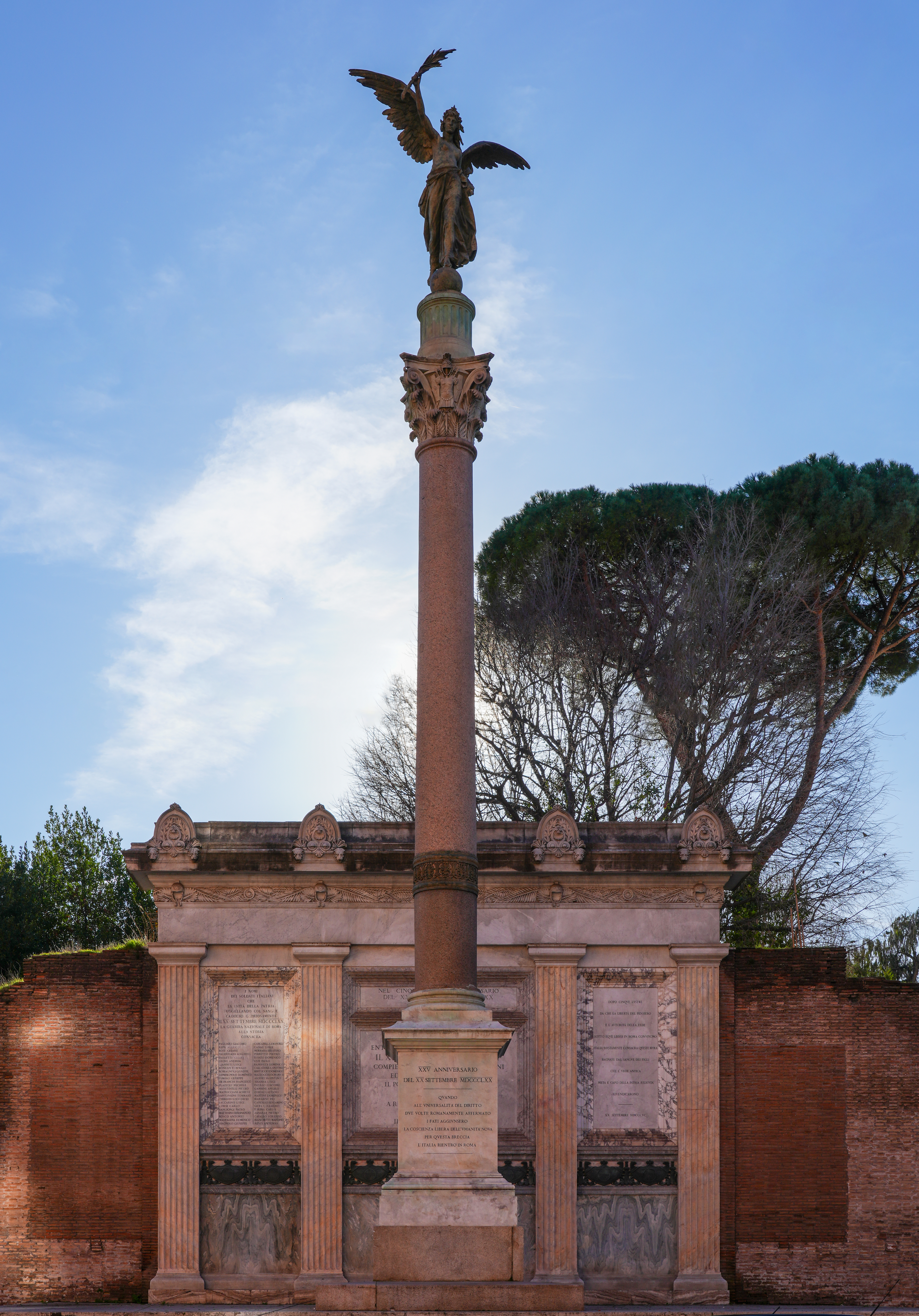
Monument including column

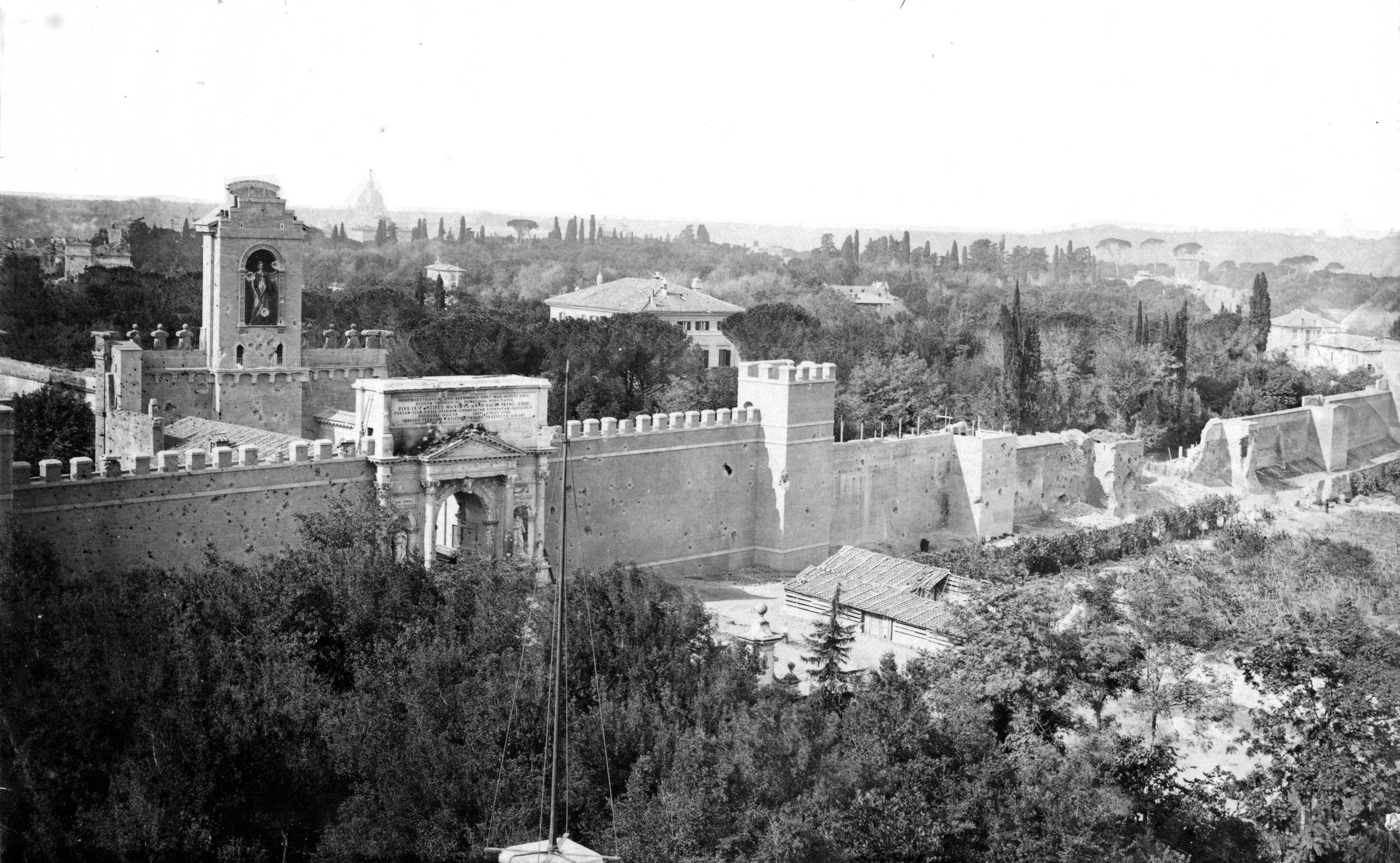
Photo from 1870 showing Porta Pia at left, and the breach in the Aurelian walls to the right

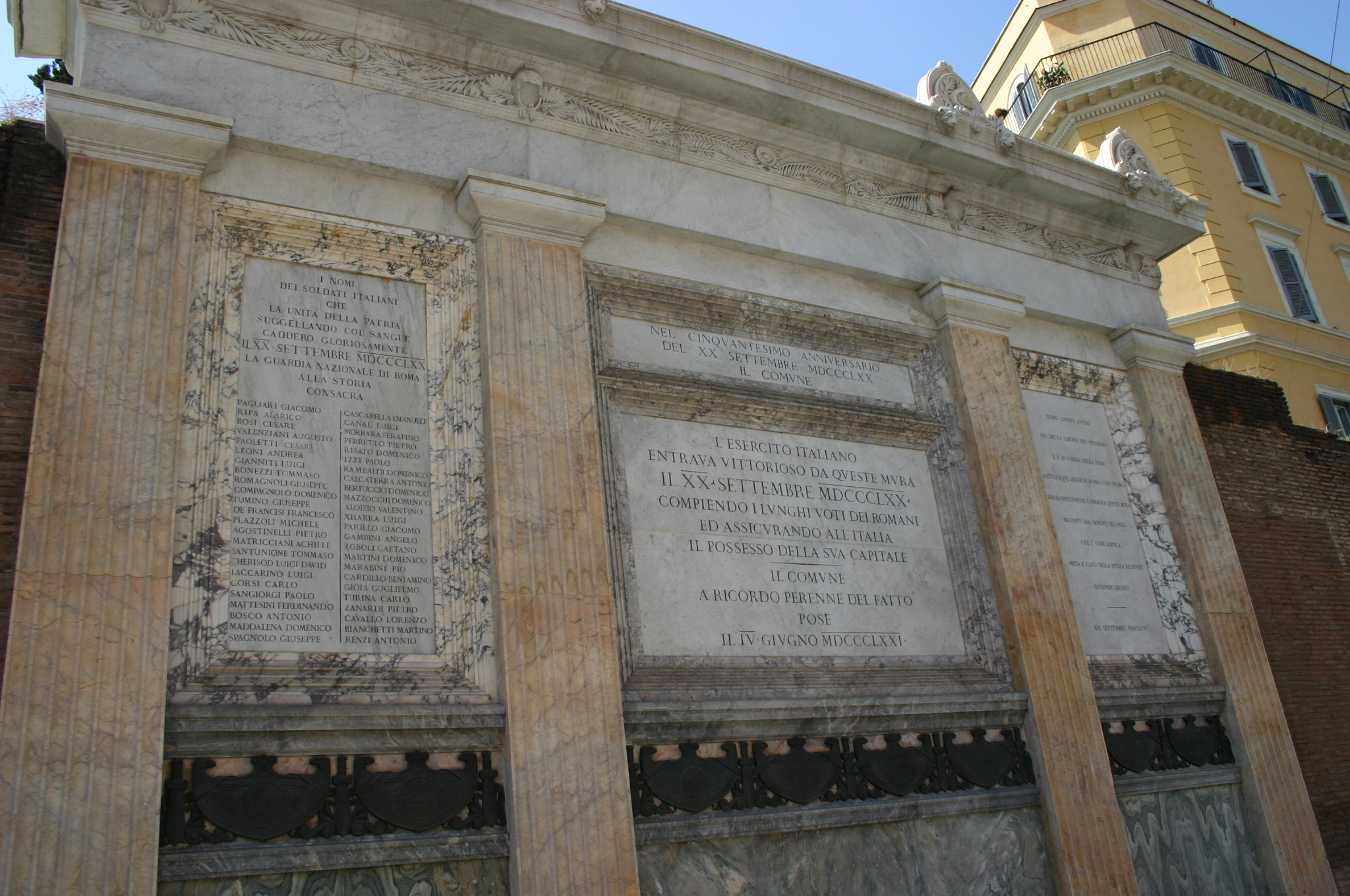
Wall of plaques in the Porta Pia Breach

The Monument to the Porta Pia Breach of Breach of Porta Pia (in Italian, Monumento a la Breccia di Porta Pia) is a memorial located on 101 Corso d'Italia, just Northwest of Porta Pia, in Rome, Italy. It commemorates the breach of the Aurelian Walls by Italian army on September 20, 1870. The Italian army quickly subdued the papal forces; the Capture of Rome leading to the annexation of nearly all of Rome and the Papal States into the Kingdom of Italy.

After the breach, a wall was rebuilt with brick and a plaque recalling the event was placed facing outward. Further plaques were added in 1900. On the 25th anniversary of the breach, the City Council of Rome, commissioned from the sculptor Ettore Ferrari, another plaque, recalling the Italian soldiers who had died during the brief attack on the city, and planned for the erection of a tall corinthian memorial column with a bronze winged victory holding a palm leaf atop. The monument was not inaugurated until 20 September 1920, fifty years after the event. Giovanni Battista Giovenale, Giuseppe Guastalla and Adolfo Apolloni completed some of the sculptures. The wall has now four doric pilasters flanking the plaques, with a lower bronze frieze depicting eagle-shields and swords. The marble frieze above shows palm leaves, helmets, and above at the roofline, four antefixes flanked below by lion heads.

At the site of Porta Pia itself, is a museum (since 1921) and a monument (since 1932) dedicated to the Bersaglieri.
