= 2018 Amazonas ambush =

Ambush of Venezuelan border guards

- Location: Amazonas, Venezuela
- Target: Venezuelan border guards
- Date: November 4, 2018
- Casualties: 3 killed 10 injured

The 2018 Amazonas ambush occurred on 4 November 2018 when three Venezuelan border guards were killed and ten were wounded in a suspected Colombian ELN guerrilla attack in the Venezuelan Amazonas state. The Venezuelan government accused the Colombian government of being unable to control its armed groups, while Colombian officials have stated that the ELN and other armed groups use the Venezuelan territory as a refuge to evade its own armed forces, often with the tolerance of local authorities.

== See also ==
- List of terrorist incidents in November 2018
- 2021 Apure clashes
