= Fathi Terbil =

Libyan politician

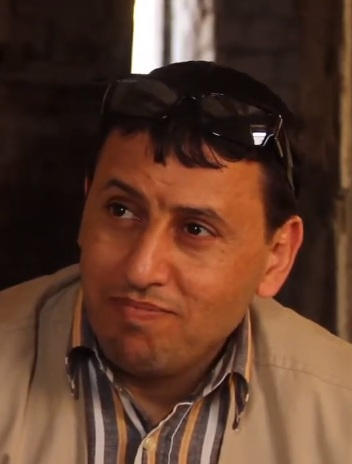
- Fathi Terbil talks to SharqOrg about Human rights violations in Libya under Muammar Gaddafi
- Born: 1972 (age 53–54); Libyan Arab Republic
- Occupations: lawyer and human rights activist

Fathi Terbil, also romanized as Fatih Turbel, (Arabic: فتحي تربل) is a Libyan lawyer and human rights activist and member of the former National Transitional Council representing Libyan youth. He represents the relatives of over 1,000 prisoners killed by Libyan security forces in Abu Salim Prison in 1996. He is also the Youth and Sports Minister for the Interim Government.

Fathi Terbil's arrest in February 2011 sparked a demonstration in Benghazi on 15 February by around 200 relatives of the deceased prisoners, which began the Libyan Civil War. He was subsequently said to have been freed. On 20 February, Terbil told Al Jazeera that security forces - sometimes firing from civilian cars without license plates - had killed dozens, perhaps hundreds, of protestors in Benghazi.

On 30 May 2011, he was awarded the Ludovic-Trarieux International Human Rights Prize ("The award given by lawyers to a lawyer"), given each year to a lawyer who throughout their career has illustrated, by activity or suffering, the defence of human rights in the world.

He was appointed to the Libyan National Transitional Council representing youth after being one of the first arrested in street protests during the Libyan Civil War on 15 February 2011 and later freed.
