= Yarmuk massacre =

Libyan massacre at Yarmuk, Libya

Yarmuk Massacre
- Part of Libyan civil war (2011)
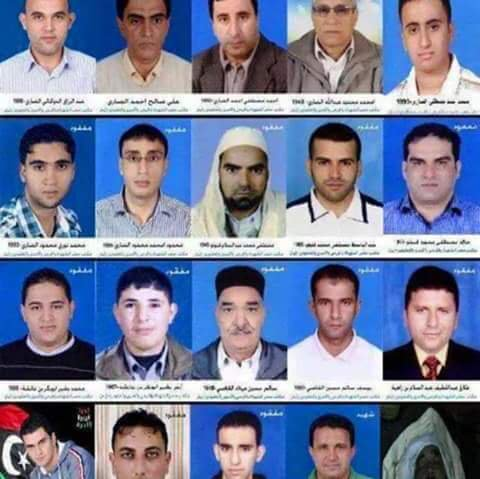
- Some Victims of the massacre
- Native name: مجزرة اليرموك
- Location: Tripoli, Libya
- Date: August 23 2011
- Attack type: Mass shooting, executions, Burned alive
- Weapons: Guns, Grenades, Machine guns
- Deaths: 124 killed (at the site)
- Perpetrator: (Libya) Gaddafi regime: Khamis Brigade
- Motive: Pro-Gaddafism

On August 23, 2011, as part of the Libyan Crisis (2011–present), members of the Khamis Brigade (a military force loyal to Muammar Gaddafi) carried out summary executions of hostages in a warehouse near Tripoli, Libya, which was then set on fire. In total, 124 people were killed at the site.

== Background information ==
During the final stages of the Libyan Civil War, which erupted in February 2011, forces loyal to Muammar Gaddafi engaged in brutal crackdowns against rebel groups seeking to overthrow his regime. The Khamis Brigade, led by Gaddafis son Khamis, was known for its involvement in violent suppression tactics.

== The massacre ==
On August 23, 2011, detainees were held in a warehouse located in the Khalida Ferjan neighborhood in Salahaddin, south of Tripoli, adjacent to the Yarmuk Military Base. The detainees, numbering approximately 153, were almost entirely civilians. These detainees were often beat, electrocuted, starved, and raped. Guards from the Khamis Brigade conducted a roll call of the detainees and subsequently carried out a vicious attack. Survivors recounted guards opening fire from the roof of the warehouse and throwing grenades into the building. Many detainees were shot and killed during the assault. 53 skulls were later found in one location and other corpses were discovered in a nearby shallow grave but there was a deliberate attempt to destroy victims' bodies. There were at least 20 survivors. Videos were taken of the site of the massacre, showing the remains of the bodies which were mostly ashes.

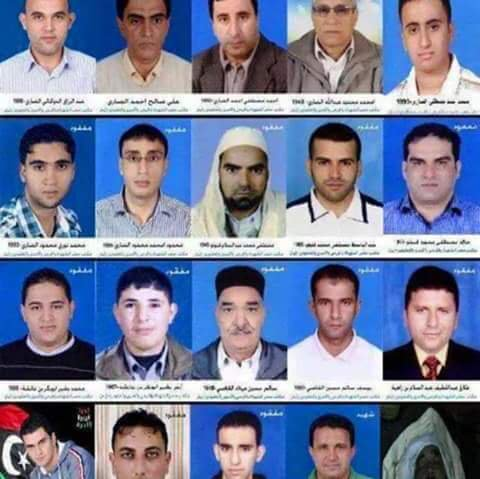
Some victims of the Yarmuk Massacre

Survivors of the massacre provided testimonies of the events. Abdulrahim Ibrahim Bashir, one of the survivors, said he escaped the onslaught by fleeing over a wall while guards were reloading their weapons. He then hid in a nearby house with some other survivors, some of whom were wounded. When they came out after three days of hiding, they noticed the fire, met the rebel brigades, and discovered the site of the incinerator.

Abdulrahim recounted witnessing guards killing wounded detainees and identified one of the perpetrators as a soldier named Ibrahim from Tajura. He also testified to being forced to repeat the Shahada using Gaddafi's name, and to refer to him as god.

== Discovery ==
The Yarmuk massacre came to light when National Transitional Council fighters seized the military base on August 26, 2011. They sensed the smell of fire and found the warehouse with smoke rising from it. They followed where the smell was coming from, they then discovered the charred remains of approximately 45 individuals within the warehouse. Human Rights Watch investigated the site and observed bullet holes in the warehouse roof.

== Trials ==
Following the massacre, trials were conducted to hold perpetrators accountable. In one case, ten individuals faced charges including torture and murder at the Yarmouk Detention Camp. Another case involved defendants associated with the operation of the makeshift prison. Sergeant-Major Hamza Mabrouk El-Harizi faced charges of mass murder in a separate military court proceeding. Survivors and victims' families actively participated in the trials, seeking justice and accountability.

== See also ==
- Abu Salim Prison massacre
