= January 2018 Benghazi bombing =

Terrorist incident in Libya

- Part of Libyan Civil War (2014–present)
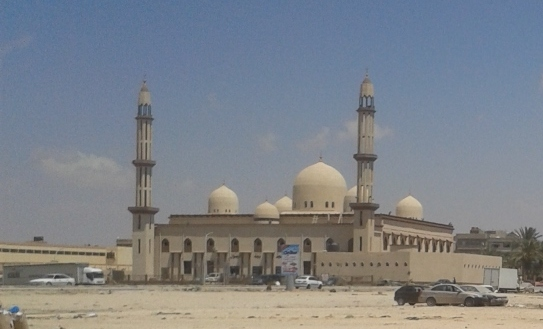
- The Bayat ar Redwan mosque in 2015, prior to the bombing
- Location: Benghazi, Libya
- Date: January 23, 2018 (UTC+02:00)
- Target: Bayaat al-Radwan Mosque
- Attack type: Car bombing
- Deaths: 41
- Injuries: 80
- Perpetrators: Accused: Islamic State of Iraq and the Levant in Libya; Shura Council of Benghazi Revolutionaries

The January 2018 Benghazi bombing was an attack with two car bombs on the Bayaat al-Radwan mosque in Benghazi, Libya.

== Attack ==
The first car bomb exploded outside of the mosque, the second bomb detonated 15 minutes later as firefighters and security forces had responded to the first explosion. 41 people died and 80 others were wounded in the attacks. According to the Libya Observer, the mosque was attended by security forces; one official was reportedly killed in the bomb attack. An Egyptian national was killed. The twin explosions shattered the relative calm that had returned to Libya’s second city, which had been the scene of more than three years of warfare.

== Responsibility ==
No group claimed responsibility for the bombings.

== See also ==
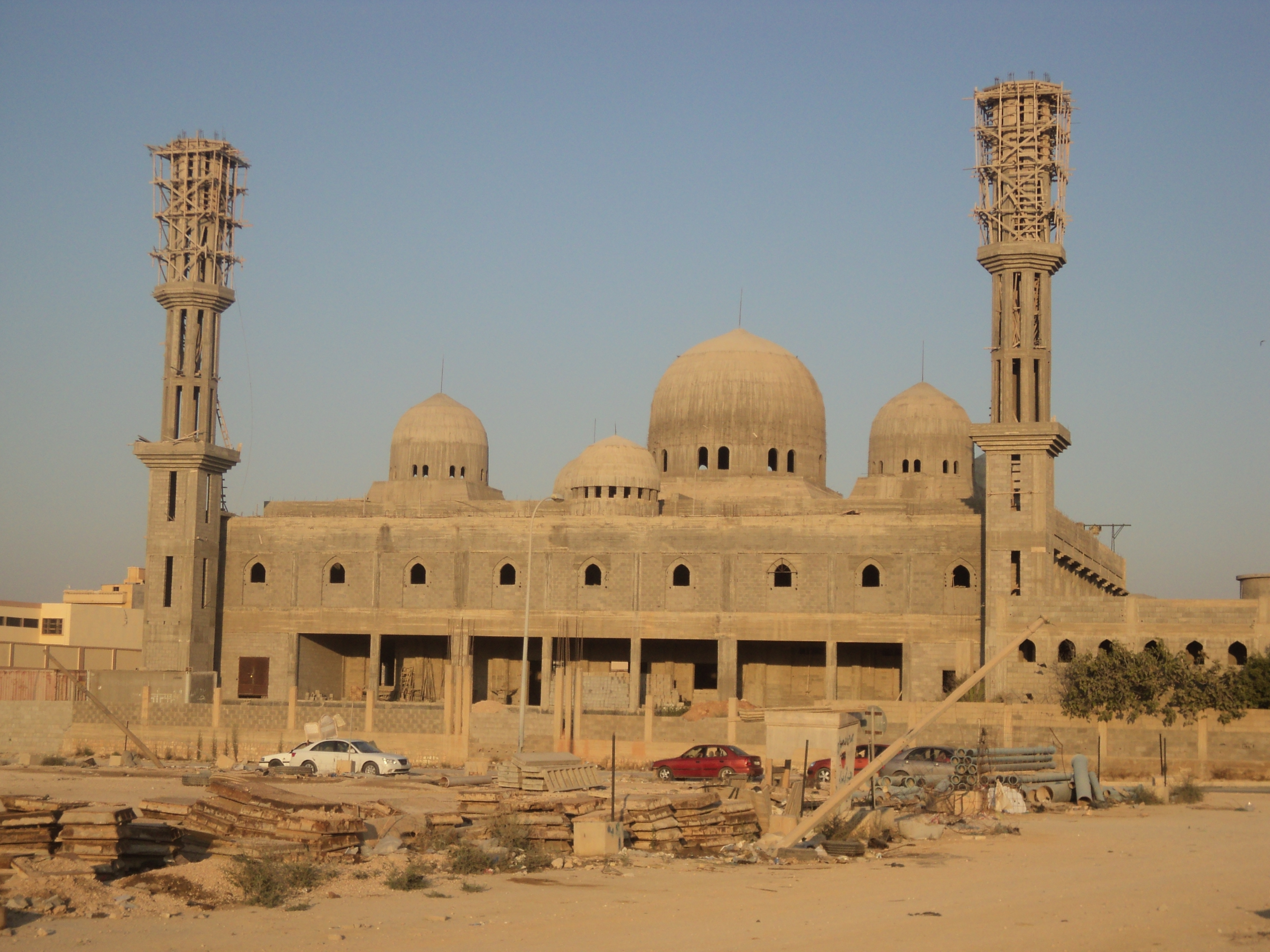
The Bayat ar Redwan mosque in 2011 when it was built.

- Libyan Civil War (2014–present)
- List of terrorist incidents in 2018
- February 2018 Benghazi bombing
