= Abu Salim prison =

Prison in Libya

Coordinates: 32°50′0″N 13°10′26″E

- Location within Libya
- Interactive map of Abu Salim prison
- Location: Tripoli, Libya
- Opened: 1984

Abu Salim prison (Arabic: سجن أبو سليم, romanized: Sijn Abū Salīm) is a maximum security prison in Tripoli, Libya. The prison was notorious during the rule of Muammar Gaddafi for alleged mistreatment and human rights abuses, including a massacre in 1996 in which Human Rights Watch estimated that 1,270 prisoners were killed.

In 2011, when the National Transitional Council invited investigators from CNN and other organizations, it found only what appeared to be animal bones at that site and announced further investigations.

== Construction ==
The prison was built in 1984 by foreign workers in record time from imported, pre-fabricated concrete slabs. Each slab had a concrete hole in its middle, so that cranes could put the slabs in place. The holes were then filled with mortar, but inmates later managed to reopen the holes, hide the openings and communicate through them with each other. Abu Salim prison was built to replace the "Black Horse" prison. The prison consisted of two identical blocks called the military prison and the central prison. Each block consisted of eight wards.

== Use before the massacre ==
The first prisoners arrived in September 1984. They had been arrested after a May 1984 attack on Gaddafi's compound at Bab al-Azizia. In March 1988, 426 out of 530 political prisoners in Abu Salim were released in an amnesty. However, the prison population increased again after mass arrests in the following years in successive waves, beginning with December 1988 to March 1989, followed by hundreds suspected of participating in a coup attempt in October 1993. In March 1995, 306 prisoners were released, followed by mass arrests from mid-May to August 1995. There were three break-outs, in July 1995, December 1995 and mid-June 1996, involving up to 400 men.

== 1996 massacre ==
Abu Salim Prison massacre
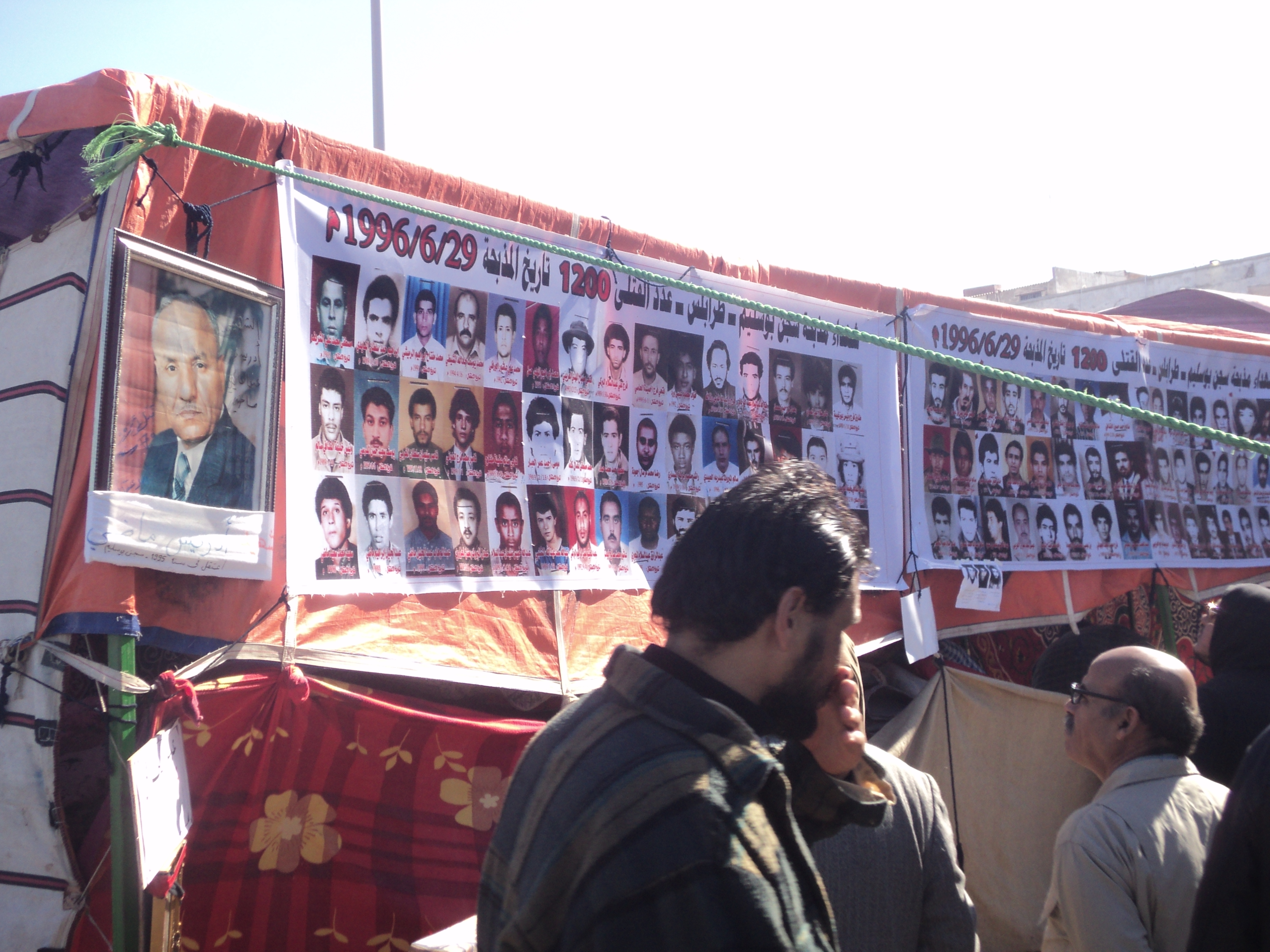
- People at a Benghazi rally looking at the photos of victims of Abu Salim prison massacre (February 2011)
- Location: Abu Salim prison, Tripoli, Libya
- Date: June 29, 1996
- Attack type: Mass shooting
- Weapons: Guns, Grenades, Machine guns
- Deaths: 1,270
- Injuries: 120 (went missing)
- Perpetrator: (Libya) Gaddafi regime

A prisoner protest took place on June 28, 1996. Food rations had been drastically cut as a punishment after several inmates had escaped from the prison a few days earlier. The revolting prisoners captured two guards while they distributed food. One guard died, and the other guards opened fire, killing six prisoners and wounding about 20. Government negotiators, including Abdullah Senussi, then met with prisoner representatives who asked for improved conditions, care for the sick and trials. Senussi did not accept to put prisoners on trial, but he agreed to the other conditions, once the captured guard was released. The prisoners agreed. 120 injured and sick prisoners were told they would receive medical care and were taken away in buses. As it turned out, they would never be seen again. The next morning, June 29, many prisoners were rounded up into the courtyards of the central prison, and were shot and killed by gunfire from the rooftops. More than 1,200 prisoners were killed over the course of two days. About 270 inmates from Block 2 and inmates from Block 1 were not shot, but were moved into the military section of the prison. The reason apparently was that the keys captured from the guards did not fit the locks of their cells. The commander spared them because he believed they had refused to participate in the uprising.

The reports by Human Rights Watch were initially based on the testimony of a single former inmate, Hussein Al Shafa’i, who stated that he did not witness a prisoner being killed: "I could not see the dead prisoners who were shot..." The figure of over 1200 killed was arrived at by Al Shafa’i calculating the number of meals he prepared when he was working in the prison's kitchen. Al Shafa'i's report was later confirmed by other testimonies, including testimonies collected by British journalist Lindsey Hilsum included in her 2012 book Sandstorm. She describes the massacre number as an uncertain estimate, because of the government's silence about the whereabouts of prisoners and their condition. The captured Mansour Dhao, a prominent figure in the Gaddafi regime, again confirmed the massacre in a BBC interview.

According to Hisham Matar, those killed were first buried in shallow graves in the six courtyards of the prison right where they had been executed. A few months later, their bodies were exhumed, the bones were ground up and dumped into the sea. An opposition group, the National Front for the Salvation of Libya, said that the bodies were removed by refrigerator trucks and later transferred to trains.

=== Government reaction ===
The Libyan government rejected any allegations about a massacre in Abu Salim for eight years.

On 18 April 2004, Gaddafi admitted that the killings at Abu Salim prison had taken place. His speech was part of an effort to normalize relations with Western countries. In May 2005, the head of the Internal Security Agency, identified as "Khaled", told Human Rights Watch that the prisoners captured some guards and stole weapons. He said the government would open an investigation on the order of the Minister of Justice, which did not happen.

Saif al-Islam Gaddafi, the eldest son of the Colonel, tried to resolve the issue via his Gaddafi International Foundation for Charity Associations circa 2007. The Libyan government said in 2009 that the killings took place amid confrontation between the government and rebels from the Libyan Islamic Fighting Group, and that allegedly some "200 guards" were killed too. In January 2011, the Libyan Arab Jamahiriya announced that it was carrying out an investigation into the incident along with international investigators. At an unspecified date, however, Gaddafi had agreed to pay compensation to families of victims.

=== Association of victims and role in 2011 civil war ===
In 2007, a group of 94 families filed a lawsuit at the Benghazi North District Court to try to find out the fate of their missing relatives. The court rejected the case, but the Benghazi Appeals Court ruled on 8 June 2008, “ordering the State to reveal the fate of the missing detainees”. Eighty more families joined the lawsuit. The families of the disappeared and killed held numerous protests in Benghazi. Lawyer Fathi Terbil helped represent them. He was arrested several times. On 24 January 2010, the Libyan authorities blocked access to YouTube after it featured videos of demonstrations in the Libyan city of Benghazi by families of detainees who were killed in Abu Salim prison in 1996, and videos of family members of Libyan leader Muammar Gaddafi at parties. Lawyer Abdul Hafiz Ghoga also represented the families of people killed in the massacre and negotiated with Gaddafi about compensations. When the Arab Spring occurred in Tunisia and Egypt, Fathi Terbil was among the first arrested on February 15 in an effort to stave off a revolution. The Abu Salim families gathered to protest his imprisonment, resulting in large crowds protesting on February 17, igniting the revolution in Libya. Abdullah Senussi, Gaddafi's intelligence chief suspected by many to have been involved in the 1996 massacre, reportedly tried to ask Terbil to make the protests stop.

During the uprising Ghoga became speaker of the National Transitional Council, in April 2011 vice president, and held this position until January 2012.

=== Alleged mass graves ===
On 25 September 2011, soon after the previous government had been overthrown, the governing National Transitional Council (NTC) said that a mass grave had been discovered outside the prison. Khalid al-Sherif, a military spokesman for the NTC, said that the grave was located based on information from captured former regime officials. He stated: "We have discovered the truth about what the Libyan people have been waiting for many years, and it is the bodies and remains of the Abu Salim massacre." Ibrahim Abu Shim, a member of the committee looking for mass graves, said that investigators believed 1,270 people were buried in the grave but the NTC needed help from the international community to find and identify the remains as they lacked the sophisticated equipment needed for DNA testing. In 2011, when the National Transitional Council invited journalists from CNN and other news outlets it found only what appeared to be animal bones at that site and announced further investigations.

== Use after the massacre ==
After the massacre, reportedly conditions improved somewhat. However, it has been estimated that between 1997 and 2001, some 200 people died of tuberculosis.

On October 4, 2006, at least one inmate was killed and nine were injured during a riot at the prison. The riot broke out after 120 inmates had been brought back from a court in Tripoli where 20 death sentences and long prison sentences against them had been upheld. The inmates had been sentenced because of membership in an illegal group, probably the Libyan Islamic Fighting Group (LIFG). The inmates had been imprisoned since the mid-1990s.

In August 2009, LIFG renounced violence. As a consequence, on October 15, 2009, 45 members of the group were released with 43 other jihadists.

In 2010, there was an amnesty during which more Islamist fighters were released. There were rumors that the prison would be destroyed and reports that parts of the prison were actually destroyed in April 2010, allegedly to hide traces of the 1996 massacre.

In 2011, during the First Libyan Civil War, the number of inmates increased again, leading to extreme overcrowding. Inmates were tortured by being blindfolded, having stone blocks thrown on them, and being beaten and kicked.

=== End of use ===
During the last days of the Libyan Civil War, prisoners were set free, but troops loyal to Gaddafi fired on them as soon as they left the prison, killing two and wounding eight. The prison was eventually captured by the rebels on 24 August and all prisoners were set free by people living near the prison who broke the locks of the prison cells.

Following the overthrow of Gaddafi, some commentators began describing the massacre as a hoax or Islamist propaganda. Khalifa Haftar, a former member of Gaddafi's government who returned to Libya during the 2011 uprising to lead a coalition against Gaddafi, promoted the sentiment that those who had been killed in the prison in 1996 were all extremists, and thus deserved their killings, alongside the claim that Islamists were responsible for failing to transition Libya from dictatorship to democracy. Haftar’s forces raided the home of Fathi Terbil, the lawyer for the Abu Salim families, while a man named Musa al-Barassi was found assassinated in Eastern Libya after preparing an annual commemoration for the massacre.

== Conditions ==
According to a testimony quoted by Amnesty International, inmates were frequently tortured. Living conditions in the prison were described as primitive, with a lack of sanitation facilities, medical care, and food.

== Legal proceedings ==
As of 2012, a number of guards and senior Gaddafi-era officials were detained and were under investigation by the military prosecutor for the 1996 prison massacre. On May 2, 2021, the Supreme Court of Libya ruled that the Abu Salim prison massacre was a genocide, and that the Libyan government must address the matter via transitional justice. The ruling overturned an earlier ruling of the TripolI Appeals Court and the case was returned to the lower court. The Libyan NGO Human Rights Solidarity said in the context of the ruling that the release of suspected massacre perpetrators "does not achieve national reconciliation, but rather is consolidating a misguided culture that encourages impunity".

== In popular culture ==
The prison massacre was featured in the 2019 short film Prisoner and Jailer, which depicts the relationship between a key official in the former regime and an official in the post-war government.

== Former inmates ==
- Ali Al-Akermi, from October 1984 until September 2002, President of the Libyan Association for Prisoners of Conscience (as of 2014).
- Ahmed al-Senussi, a member of the NTC, was held until 2001.
- Abdalhakim Belhaj, Emir of the Libyan Islamic Fighting Group, held from 2004 to 2010.
- Abu Sufian bin Qumu (2007–2010), a former Guantanamo inmate.
- Abdelhamid Shukri, a member of the Muslim Brotherhood.
- Anwar Haraga, 1989 until 2000.
- Ali al-Fakhiri, Al-Qaeda suspect who was tortured by the CIA in Egypt and gave false information, extradited to Libya and held from 2005 to 2009 until his alleged suicide.
- Jaballa Matar, father of Libyan-British writer Hisham Matar and a prominent member of the National Front for the Salvation of Libya, likely held from the time of his arrest in Egypt in 1990 until his possible death in the 1996 massacre.
- Matthew VanDyke (2011), an American volunteer in the Civil War held in solitary confinement.

== See also ==
- Politics of Libya
- Human rights in Libya
- List of massacres in Libya
- Sednaya Prison
- Abu Ghraib prison
