= March 2018 Mogadishu bombing =

Terrorist incident in Somalia

At 4:30pm on 22 March 2018, a car bomb exploded outside Wehliye hotel on Maka Al-Mukarrama Road in Mogadishu, Somalia, killing 18 people. Al-Shabaab claimed responsibility for the bombing, saying that they targeted a meeting of government and security officials.
