= 2018 Vienna stabbings =

Stabbing in Austria

On 7 March 2018, two stabbings occurred in Vienna, Austria during the evening. A man has been arrested for the two attacks. On 11 March 2018, there was a separate stabbing attack at the Embassy of Iran in the city. The Austrian government hardened its asylum policy after the attacks.

== Events ==
=== Attack in Leopoldstadt ===
At 7:45pm, a family was attacked by a man outside a Japanese restaurant in Leopoldstadt, central Vienna, using a knife, three individuals in a family group were injured. At 8:15pm, suspect stabbed a Chechen immigrant at the Praterstern train station. An Afghan man, carrying two knives, was arrested. A blood trail lead the police to his hideout.

==== Suspect and motive ====
Although initially unclear if the two incidents were connected, the arrested 23-year-old man admitted attacking the family earlier in the night, yet he claimed that the attacks were not politically motivated. The suspect allegedly attacked the family because of his "bad, aggressive mood" and frustration about his life situation. The 67-year-old father received life-threatening injuries, the 56-year-old wife and the 17-year-old daughter were seriously injured. The suspect said that he committed the attack on the second man, a 20-year-old, because he made him responsible for his drug addiction.

The assailant arrived in Austria in 2015 European migrant crisis.

On 10 March, media reported that the suspect had already been convicted of drug trafficking in 2016 and obtained three months of conditional detention. That was confirmed by the police. The day before, the authorities had confirmed that the man had been in prison from August to December 2017 - also for drug trafficking - in Klagenfurt.

On 12 March 2018 ORF reported, that the suspect had tried to commit suicide while in detention.

==== Investigation ====
The Austrian Interior Ministry launched an investigation to determine possible mistakes made by the authorities regarding a possible earlier deportation of the suspect. On 15 March the Austrian Interior Minister Herbert Kickl spoke of a communication problem between the involved bodies, which led to the release of the convicted perpetrator.

=== Attack on Embassy of Iran ===
On 11:30pm on 11 March 2018, an Austrian soldier was attacked with a knife in front of the Iranian embassy in Vienna which he guarded. The soldier was stabbed repeatedly and injured. The attacker was shot dead. Security was stepped up at diplomatic missions across the city, because the police feared that other people may have been involved in the attack. A police spokesman said, that the soldier was only saved by a stab-proof vest: "They started a fight because the aggressor was too close and the soldier shot him at least four times with his handgun." The attacker’s home was searched and his internet activities were reviewed.

The perpetrator was a 26-year-old Austrian of Egyptian origin. Authorities said, he sympathized with radical Islamist ideology, but the exact motive was subject to further investigation.

== Reactions ==
The Austrian chancellor Sebastian Kurz commented on the Leopoldstadt case: "It is clear that many mistakes have been made in recent years in the migration and asylum policy. Unlimited migration is the cause of many problems we are currently facing. Therefore, the new Federal Government wants to fix these mistakes of the past years."

In the Profil magazine, the Afghanistan expert Sarajuddin Rasuly stated on the Leopoldstadt case: "Some refugees from Afghanistan came as criminals or became it during their journey. Between Afghanistan, Pakistan, Iran, Turkey they went stealing or trafficking for the smugglers. Some young men were even raped by them. When they arrive in Austria, they are dehumanized and no longer conform to the norms of a functioning society. They have lost the threshold for violence."

== Impact ==
On 13 March the Austrian Interior Minister Herbert Kickl announced that Austria will change its asylum policy because of the incidents in the recent days, saying: "We need courageous approaches... The current asylum law no longer meets the demands of a globalized world." The Austrian government intended to use the EU Presidency in the second half of the year to win alliances in Europe on this issue. In addition, Kickl announced that he wants to improve the system of Rückkehrberatung (return counseling) for asylum seekers.
