= Monument to the Bersagliere, Porta Pia =

Coordinates: 41.90959°N 12.50171°E

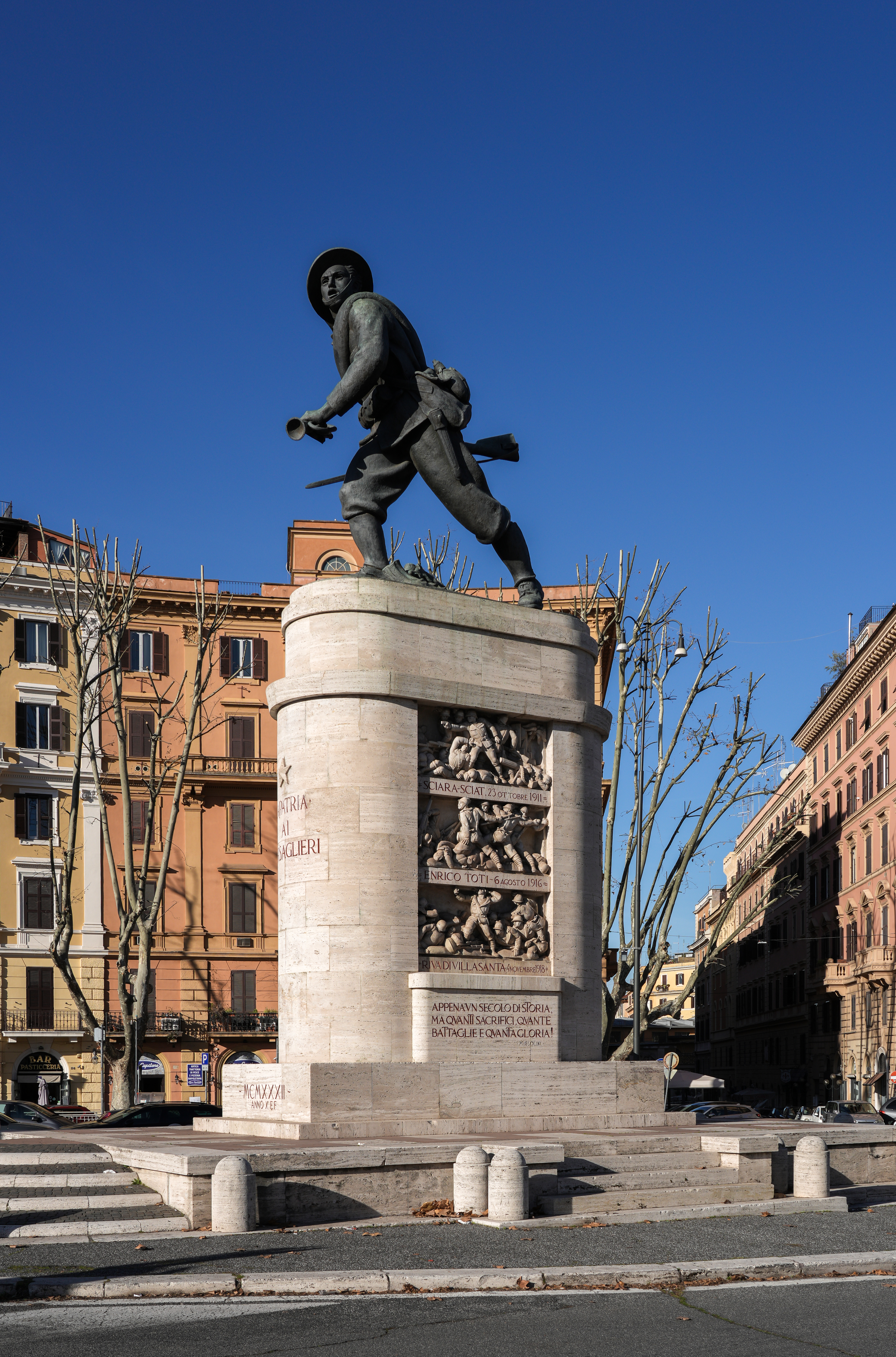
Monument from the Eastern side

The Monument to the Bersagliere is a statuary monument located in Piazzale di Porta Pia, near the spot, where Italian soldiers were able to breach the city walls of Rome in 1870, thus leading to the integration of Rome into the Kingdom of Italy. The monument stands to the north of the gate, outside the walls. Attached to the gate buildings, designed by Michelangelo, that once represented Porta Pia, is a Museum of the History of the Bersaglieri (Museo Storico dei Bersaglieri), established here in 1921.

Plans for a monument were proposed as early as 1923, but placed in abeyance by Mussolini in order not to antagonize the papal administration. Starting in 1926, negotiations led to the 1929 Lateran Treaty between Italy and the Vatican. In 1930, a public competition for a design garnered 24 submissions. The committee, influenced by Mussolini, chose the design by Publio Morbiducci. The statue was inaugurated on 18 September 1932 in the presence of King Vittorio Emanuele III, Prince Umberto, Benito Mussolini, Achille Starace, and the Governor of Rome Francesco Boncompagni Ludovisi. The fascist government favored virile and bellicose monuments, recalling or inspiring the dreams of empire.

The monument has a statue of a dynamic and stern bersaglieri or marksman, running towards the gate, made of bronze, with the rifle in his right hand and the trumpet in his left. The large oval travertine base was made by the sculptor Mancini, with a series of bas-reliefs in Trani stone depicting Bersaglieri-linked battles or soldiers, sculpted by Morbiducci, including the Battle of Ponte di Goito, the death of Luciano Manara, the breach of Porta Pia, on the left; and the Battle of Sciara Sciat (Shar al-Shatt), the wounding of Enrico Toti, the death of Alberto Riva di Villasanta, on the right.

Under the reliefs, are two inscriptions in geometric sans serifs (with the V substituting for U: one by Mussolini himself: "Just a century of history, but how many sacrifices, how many battles and how much glory!". The other by Emanuele Filiberto of Savoy, Duke of Aosta: "Nothing resists the sharpshooter".
