= Al-Jawazi massacre =

al-Jawazi massacre
- Native name: مذبحة الجوازي
- Location: Benghazi, Ottoman Tripolitania
- Date: 5 September 1816
- Target: al-Jawazi tribe
- Attack type: Massacre, mass murder, summary execution
- Deaths: 10,000+
- Perpetrator: Yusuf Karamanli
- Motive: Refusal of the al-Jawazi tribe to pay tribute to the Pasha, reprisal for revolt against Ottoman authority

The al-Jawazi massacre (Arabic: مذبحة الجوازي) is a name given to a massacre committed against the Arab tribe of al-Jawazi of Banu Sulaym in the city of Benghazi in Cyrenaica in eastern Ottoman Tripolitania (now Libya), on 5 September 1816, in which over 10,000 members of the tribe were killed. The site of the massacre was a Turkish castle in the city. It was done in retaliation for the revolt that broke out against the rule of the Karamanli dynasty and their refusal to pay the imposed taxes. The pasha Yusuf Karamanli claimed to pacify the al-Jawazi tribe by inviting 45 of its notables and sheikhs, accompanied with hundreds of other members of the tribe, to the castle for the purpose of requesting peace with them. As soon as they sat down, the Pasha's guards and janissaries attacked them and slaughtered them; while members of the tribe who were stationed outside the walls of the castle were attacked and large numbers of them were massacred, including women, old men, and children, killing over 10,000 of them. The tribe members who survived fled Tripolitania and left for neighbouring countries such as Egypt, Tunis, and Algiers.
