= February 2018 Benghazi bombing =

2018 bombing in Benghazi, Libya

- Part of Libyan Civil War (2014–present)
- Location: Benghazi, Libya
- Date: February 9, 2018 (UTC+02:00)
- Target: Mosque
- Attack type: Bombing
- Weapon: Explosives
- Deaths: 2
- Injuries: 143
- Perpetrator: Unknown

The February 2018 Benghazi bombing was an attack with bombs on the Saad Ben Obadah mosque in Benghazi, Libya.

== Attack ==
The bomb attack occurred on Friday, 9 February 2018 in the Saad Ben Obadah mosque in Benghazi. The explosives, hidden in bags, were detonated remotely during Friday prayers. As a result, two people died and 143 more were injured; the victims included children. No group claimed responsibility for the attack.

== Reactions ==
After the bombing, all mosques in Benghazi were instructed to install security cameras.

== See also ==
- Libyan Civil War (2014–present)
- List of terrorist incidents in 2018
- January 2018 Benghazi bombing
