= July 2018 Mogadishu bombings =

Al-Shabaab attack

- Part of Somali Civil War (2009–present)
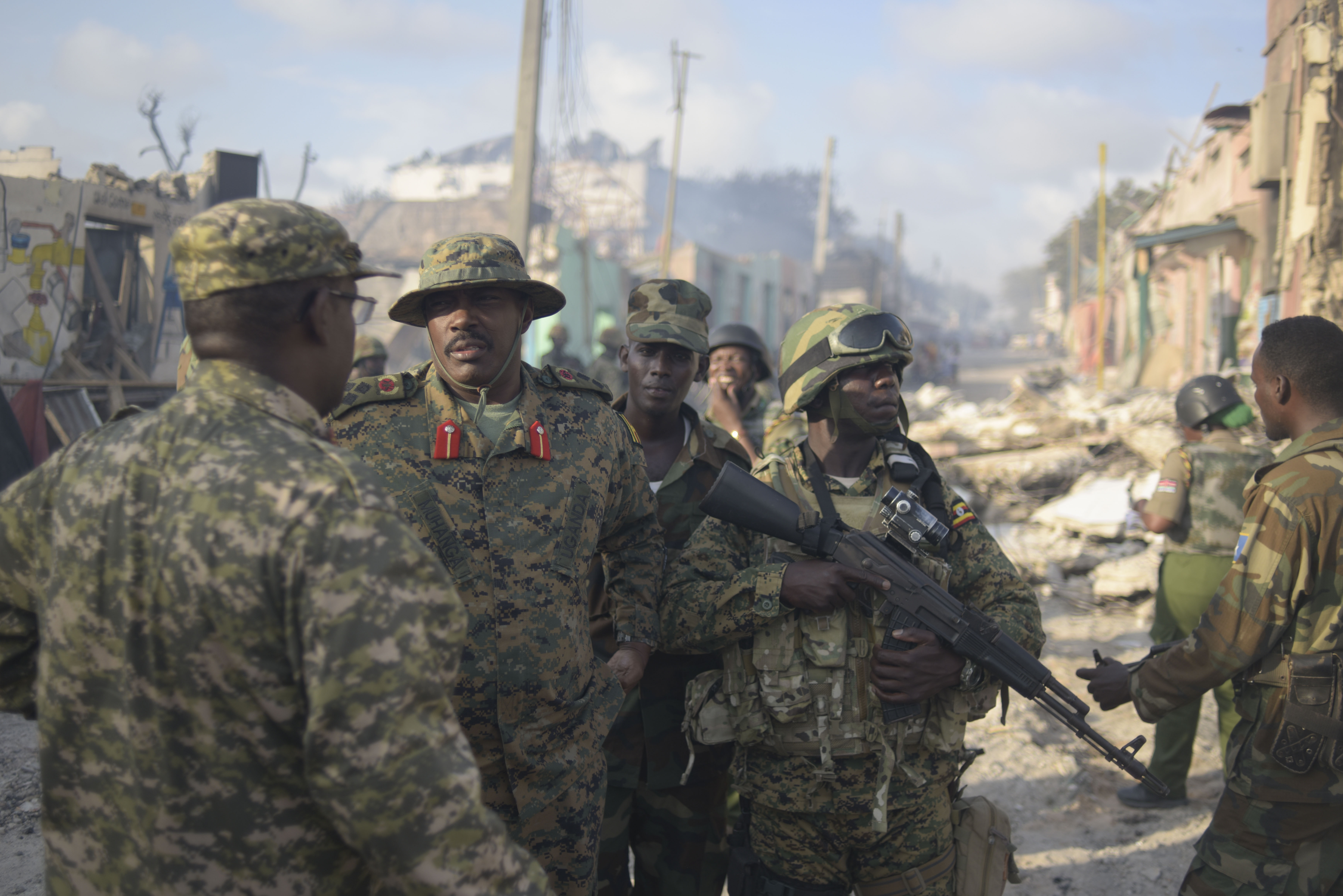
- The African Union Mission in Somalia's Ugandan Contingent Commander, Brigadier General Kayanja Muhanga, visits the site of a VBIED attack conducted by the militant group al Shabaab in the Somali capital of Mogadishu on October 15, 2017

- Mogadishu (Somalia)
- Location: Mogadishu, Somalia
- Date: July 7, 2018
- Attack type: Suicide car bombing and shooting
- Weapons: Suicide car bombings, gun
- Deaths: 20 (+3 attackers)
- Injuries: 24
- Perpetrator: Al-Shabaab

The July 2018 Mogadishu bombings took place on July 7, 2018 when fighters of the Somali group Al-Shabaab attacked the compound of Somalia's interior and security ministries in the center of Mogadishu.

At least 20 people were killed and two dozen others wounded and all three gunmen were killed by the security forces.

== Attack ==
The attack started when the terrorists detonated two car bombs outside the main gate of the interior ministry building before three militants stormed it.
