= Tripoli military school airstrike =

- Part of Western Libya campaign of the Second Libyan Civil War
- Location: Al-Hadhba military school, Tripoli, Libya
- Date: January 4, 2020; 9 PM
- Target: Cadets
- Weapon: Blue Arrow 7 missile from a Wing Loong II drone
- Deaths: 26
- Injuries: 33
- Perpetrators: Libyan National Army; United Arab Emirates

On January 4, 2020, a missile strike was conducted on a military school used by the Government of National Accord (GNA) in Tripoli, Libya during a siege of Tripoli by the Libyan National Army (LNA). Twenty-six people were killed and thirty-three were wounded.

The GNA blamed the LNA for the attack. The LNA denied involvement and blamed responsibility of the strike on shelling by militants. According to a BBC report, the drone strike was conducted by a United Arab Emirates controlled drone. The UAE denied involvement in the strike.

== Prelude ==
The Libyan National Army, a rival government and faction that fought the UN-recognized Government of National Accord during the Second Libyan Civil War, launched an offensive against the GNA headquarters and Libyan capital of Tripoli in April 2019. On December 12, 2019, LNA commander Khalifa Haftar announced the "final battle" for Tripoli, committing more forces to the city. The LNA also increased its air presence around the city. In the Hadhba neighborhood that same day, five civilians were killed by LNA bombings.

== Airstrike ==
Around 9pm on January 4, around 50 cadets of the GNA-affiliated Al-Hadhba military school were on a parade ground, waiting to be sent back to their dormitories. Most of the cadets were students between the ages of 18 and 22, from cities across Libya. When the paramedics arrived, it was hard to discern and identify bodies due to many being charred. Videos from Tripoli hospitals showed limbless cadets and bloodied floors. The initial death toll of the attack reported by the GNA was sixteen killed and thirty-seven injured, but this rose to twenty-six killed and thirty-three injured. A survivor of the attack stated he saw "guys whose torsos were separated from their bodies... and we couldn't do anything."

== Aftermath ==
According to a BBC report, the missile strike was conducted by a United Arab Emirates operated drone. The missile was reported by BBC to be a Chinese Blue Arrow 7 missile fired from a Wing Loong II drone. The United Arab Emirates denied involvement in the incident, stating the cadets were killed in a bombardment by local forces.

Students who survived the attack urged international authorities to hold the perpetrators accountable for the airstrike in a statement given on the one-year anniversary of the airstrike.

== Reactions ==
- Government of National Accord: The GNA blamed the Libyan National Army and called to refer Khalifa Haftar to the International Criminal Court for crimes against humanity.
- Libyan National Army: A spokesperson for the LNA denied launching a strike on the military school and blamed the attack on Islamic militants.
- United Arab Emirates: The UAE denied involvement in the incident, stating that the attack was conducted by local forces.
- United Nations: UNSMIL condemned the attack.
