= Publio Morbiducci =

Italian sculptor (1889–1963)

- Born: 28 August 1889; Rome, Italy
- Died: 31 March 1963 (aged 73); Rome, Italy
- Occupation: Sculptor

Publio Morbiducci (28 August 1889 – 31 March 1963) was an Italian sculptor. His work was part of the sculpture event in the art competition at the 1936 Summer Olympics.

He was active in projects for the Mussolini government. In 1932, he completed most of the sculptures of the Monument to the Bersaglieri, Porta Pia, Rome. In 1937 he was named to the Accademia di San Luca and in 1938 his Discus thrower at Rest was added to the statues of the Stadio dei Marmi. In 1939, he completed the marble frieze of the Palazzo degli Uffici all'EUR.

== Bibliography ==
- Publio Morbiducci. Pitture, sculture, medaglie, catalogo della mostra all'Accademia Nazionale di S. Luca, ed. N. Cardano, Edizioni De Luca, 1999
- Publio Morbiducci. Sculture dipinti disegni, introduction by C. Strinati, Artemide edizioni, 2000
- Il corpo in corpo, ed. B. Mantura, Spoleto, 1990
- Vittorio Sgarbi (ed.), Scultura italiana del primo Novecento, Bologna, Grafis Edizioni, 1993, pp. 174–175, SBN IT\ICCU\CFI\0264302
- Publio Morbiducci, Disegni, ed. Nicoletta Cardano, Ed. Bottarel & Fol, Brescia, 2007
- Publio Morbiducci, catalogo ragionato dell'opera xilografica, ed. F. Parisi, Ed. TIF, Crocetta di Montello (TV), 2013
